= List of Korean Buddhists =

The following is a list of Koreans who are Korean by ethnicity and Buddhist by religion.

== Celebrities ==
- Chae Rim
- Eun Ji-won
- Hong Jin-young
- Jang Woo-hyuk
- Jang Wooyoung (2PM)
- Jang Yoon-jeong
- Jihoon (Treasure)
- Kan Mi-youn
- Kang Ji-young
- Kim Jong-kook
- Kim Min-jong
- Lee Soo-geun
- Lee Young-ah
- Lee Young-eun
- Leo (VIXX)
- MC Sniper
- Moon Geun-young
- Moon Hee-joon
- Outsider (rapper)
- Park Hyung-sik (ZE:A)
- Park Gyu-ri
- Park Ji-yeon (T-ara)
- Seulgi (Red Velvet)
- Shin Jung-hwan
- Sohee (Wonder Girls)
- Song Ji-hyo
- Soo Ae
- Solar (Mamamoo)
- Soyeon ((G)I-dle)
- Suho (EXO)
- Sung Si-kyung
- Uhm Tae-woong
- Winter (Aespa)
- Yoo Jae-suk
- Yuk Young-soo
- Yves

== Ancient people ==
=== Philosophers and monks ===
- Doseon
- Gihwa
- Hyecho
- Hyujeong
- Ichadon
- Jinul
- Muhak
- Seungnang
- Taego Bou
- Uicheon
- Uisang
- Woncheuk
- Wonhyo
- Yujeong

Monarchs

- King Sejong the Great
- Taejo of Goryeo
- Taejo of Joseon
- Queen Seondeok of Silla

== See also ==
- List of American Buddhists
