= Beopjeong =

Buddhist monk and writer from South Korea

Personal life
- Born: Pak Jae-cheol; November 5, 1932 Haenam County, South Jeolla Province, South Korea
- Died: March 11, 2010 (77 years old) Gilsangsa Temple, Seoul, South Korea

Religious life
- Religion: Buddhism
- Dharma name: 법정

Korean name
- Hangul: 박재철
- Hanja: 朴在喆
- RR: Bak Jaecheol
- MR: Pak Chaech'ŏl

Dharma name
- Hangul: 법정
- Hanja: 法頂
- RR: Beopjeong
- MR: Pŏpchŏng

Beopjeong (Korean: 법정; 5 November 1932 - 11 March 2010), born Pak Jaecheol (박재철), was a Buddhist monk and writer from South Korea.

== Biography ==
Born in 1932 in Haenam County, South Jeolla Province, Beopjeong graduated from Mokpo Commercial High School and entered Chonnam National University. In 1954, his junior year, he left school and decided to become a Buddhist monk as a follower of Hyobong Hangnul, a Jogye Seon master.

Beopjeong was widely known for his musoyu (무소유) spirit, literally meaning "nonpossession" or "lack of possession," which he propagated through many of his publications, which have been loved by many Koreans. The following is a representative example of his direct, poignant style:

자연의 질서에 귀를 기울이고 있으면,
마음에 묻은 때가 조금씩 씻겨나가는 것을
가늠할 수 있다.

이런 날 누구에게도,
그 어떤 것에도 방해받음 없이
적적히 앉아 있으면
그대로가 존재의 기쁨이 된다.

산방한담

Translation:

Listening to the sounds of nature,
I can ponder how best
to scrub away the grime of my heart.

On a day like this,
with nothing to disturb me,
sitting alone,
I know the joy of being.

Quiet Talks in the Mountains

On December 14, 1997, Cardinal Stephen Kim Sou-hwan of the Korean Catholic Church attended and offered congratulations on the opening of Gilsangsa Temple (길상사 吉祥寺), located in Seongbuk District, Seoul. In return, Beopjeong visited Myeongdong Cathedral on February 24, 1998, and delivered a special speech showing the harmony between religions.

On March 11, 2010, at the age of 77, in the 55th year of his monkhood, Beopjeong died in Gilsangsa, as a result of chronic lung cancer.

He said in his will: "Don't hold a funeral for me. Don't make a coffin. Dress me in cotton, which I used to wear. Scatter my ashes on the flower garden of the hut where I used to live." In accordance with his will, a simple cremation rite was held at Songgwangsa in Suncheon on March 13, 2010. There was no decorated bier or elegies, and thousands of people from all over the country attended.

== Bibliography ==
=== In Korean ===
- Non-Possession (무소유, 無所有) ISBN 9788908041318
- The Sound of the Soul (영혼의 모음) ISBN 8946413409
- Words and Silence (말과 침묵) ISBN 9788946413429
- The Sound of Water, the Sound of Wind (물 소리 바람 소리) ISBN 9788946413375
- Quiet Talks in the Mountains (산방한담) ISBN 8946411368
- Throwing It Away, Leaving It All Behind (버리고 떠나기) ISBN 8946413360
- India Travel Journal (인도 기행) ISBN 9788946415539
- Desolate Forests, As Birds Have Gone (새들이 떠나간 숲은 적막하다) ISBN 8946413417
- Flower Blossoms in the Mountains (산에는 꽃이 피네) ISBN 9788995904992
- The Beautiful Finish (아름다운 마무리) ISBN 9788995904961
- The Joy of Living Alone (홀로 사는 즐거움) ISBN 9788946414709
- One Life, One Meeting (일기일회) ISBN 9788995904985
- One for All, All for One (한 사람은 모두를 모두는 한 사람을) ISBN 9788993838022
- May All Beings Be Happy (살아있는 것은 다 행복하라) ISBN 8995757701
- The Books I Have Loved (내가 사랑한 책들) ISBN 9788993838107

=== In translation ===
- May All Beings Be Happy (2006) - edited by Ryu Shiva, translated by Matty Wegehaupt
- The Sound of Water, the Sound of Wind (2010) - edited and translated by Brian Barry
- Meditations of a Zen Master (2012) - edited and translated by David Bannon
- Meditations of a Korean Monk (2012) - edited and translated by David Bannon

== See also ==
- Buddhism in Korea
