= Ijangui =

7th century Buddhist treatise by Wonhyo

- Hangul: 이장의
- Hanja: 二障義
- RR: Ijangui
- MR: Ijangŭi

The Ijangui, or Doctrine of the Two Hindrances, is an in-depth treatise concerning the various theories developed on the doctrine of the two hindrances of the Yogācāra school of Buddhism, by the Korean scholar-monk Wonhyo. This treatise examines and compares the various explications regarding the two hindrances as found in the major Yogācāra texts, including the Yogācārabhūmi-śāstra, Saṃdhinirmocana-sūtra, Mahāyānābhidharma-samuccaya-vyākhyā, Śrīmālādevī-simhanāda-sūtra and Xianyang lun, along with a wide range of other Mahāyāna texts.

== See also ==
- Tongbulgyo
- Essence-Function
- Korean Buddhism
