= Jikjisa =

Buddhist temple in Gimcheon, South Korea

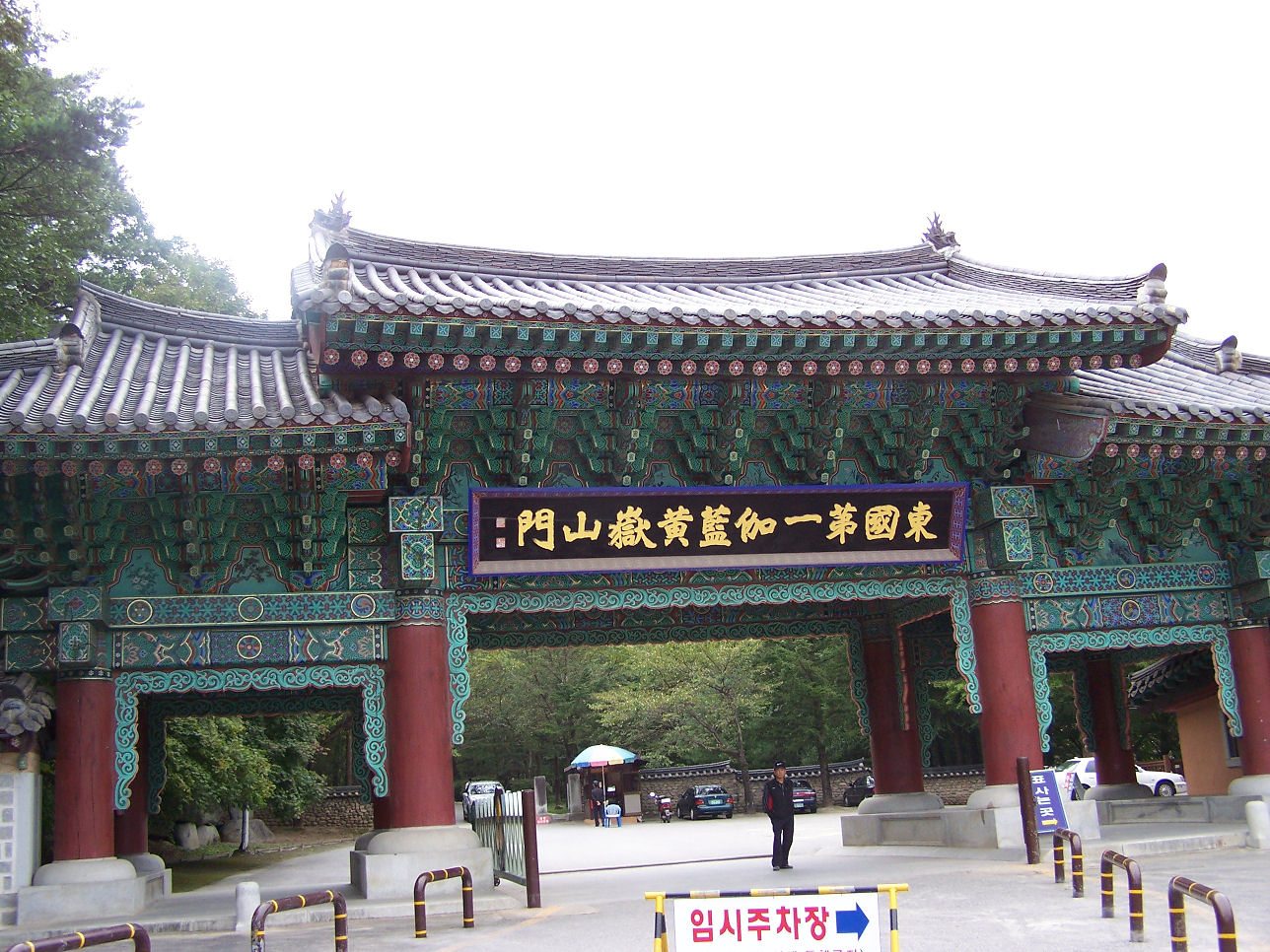
- Jikjisa, South Korea

- Location within South Korea

Religion
- Affiliation: Buddhism
- Sect: Jogye Order of Korean Seon

Location
- Location: 95 Bukam-gil, Daehang-myeon, Gimcheon, North Gyeongsang Province (Korean: 경상북도 김천시 대항면 북암길 95)
- Country: South Korea
- Coordinates: 36°06′59.4″N 128°00′15.6″E

Korean name
- Hangul: 직지사
- Hanja: 直指寺
- RR: Jikjisa
- MR: Chikchisa

Jikjisa (Korean: 직지사) is a head temple of the Jogye Order of Seon Buddhism. It is located on the slopes of Hwangaksan in Daehang-myeon, Gimcheon, North Gyeongsang Province, South Korea. It may be one of the oldest temples in South Korea.

== History ==
Jikjisa was established in 418 by Preceptor Ado. Buddhism, a religion originating in what is now India, was transmitted to Korea via China in the late 4th century. The Samguk yusa records Ado among 3 monks who first brought Buddhist teaching, or Dharma, to Korea: Malananta (late 4th century) - an Indian Buddhist monk who brought Buddhism to Baekje in the southern Korean peninsula, Sundo -a Chinese Buddhist monk who brought Buddhism to Goguryeo in northern Korea, and Ado - a monk who brought Buddhism to Silla in central Korea.

There are two stories concerning this temple's name, Jikji (직지; 直指, literally “pointing with an index finger”). One is that Ado pointed to Hwangaksan from Dorisa in Seonsan, and said, “There is also a good temple site on that mountain. The story is that in 936 when Great Master Neungyeo reconstructed the temple, he didn’t use a ruler but instead he used his own hands to measure the land and construction materials, thus, the name Jikji.

Hwangaksan (literally “Yellow Mountain”), on which Jikjisa stands, represents the color yellow, one of the five colors that correspond to the Wu Xing. The colors black, blue, red, white and yellow correspond respectively to north, east, south, west and center. Jikjisa is located near the center of Korea. That is why the mountain is called Hwangaksan and why Jikjisa has been considered one of Korea's foremost temples since ancient times. From Biro Peak, the summit of Hwangaksan, one can see the three provinces of Gyeongsang, Jeolla and Chungcheong. Thus it can also be said that the temple is situated at the center of three of Korea's southern provinces.

Jikjisa saw two reconstruction efforts during the Silla era. The first reconstruction, passed down as oral history, was supposedly conducted in 645 by Vinaya Master Jajang Yulsa. The second reconstruction, verified by written records, was carried out in 930 by Great Master Cheonmuk. The “Stele of Jikjisa’s Daejangdang Hall Record,” published in the Daedong Geumseokseo (大東金石書; "Daedong Epigraphy Collection"), says that Daejangdang Hall was built in 930 and that “transcripts of the entire Buddhist canon in gold ink” were enshrined there.

During the Joseon era, an earthenware urn holding the placenta from the birth of Joseon's second king, Jeongjong, was enshrined on a Hwangaksan peak north of Jikjisa which is auspicious “snake-head formation” from a geomantic perspective, making the temple the guardian of the royal placenta. Today Jikjisa is the head temple of the eighth religious district of the Jogye Order of Seon and supervises 54 branch temples scattered among the deep folds of the Baekdu-daegan range in northwestern North Gyeongsang Province.

It was at Jikjisa that Great Master Yujeong was ordained, who led a righteous army of monks to save Korea during the Japanese invasions of Korea (1592–98). Originally from Miryang, South Gyeongsang Province, Yujeong moved to Yuchon Village very near Jikjisa at age 13 and he studied under Hwang Yeoheon, the great-great-grandson of Chief State Councilor Hwang Hui. However, at age 15, his mother died, and the next year his father also died. This sudden turn of events led Samyeong to become a monk under the guidance of Great Master Sinmuk.

When Yujeong was 18, he earned the highest score in the State Examination for Monks, and later, when he was 30, he became the head of Jikjisa Temple. At age 32 he was recommended to be the head of Bongeunsa, succeeding his teacher Great Master Seosan. However, he followed Master Seosan to Bohyeonsa on Myohyangsan instead. While at Yujeomsa on Mount Kumgang (now North Korea), Japanese troops invaded Korea in 1592. Yujeong quickly responded to a letter sent by his teacher Seosan and organized and led a righteous army, eventually gaining fame for his leadership.

There is one remaining object related to Yujeong's early days at Jikjisa. It is a flat stone beside the Heavenly Kings’ Gate. One day, Great Master Sinmuk dozed off during meditation. In a dream he saw a golden dragon entwined around the gingko tree next to the Heavenly Kings’ Gate. When he awoke, he rushed to the gingko tree and saw a flat stone which appeared as if someone had carved it. A young boy was asleep on it, so Sinmuk took the boy as his disciple; he later became Great Master Yujeong. In 1800 that gingko tree was destroyed in a fire that also burned down Manseru Pavilion, but the flat stone next to the Heavenly Kings’ Gate remains. Perhaps the stone is awaiting another Yujeong.

== Tourism ==
It also offers Temple Stay programs where visitors can experience Buddhist culture.

== Gallery ==
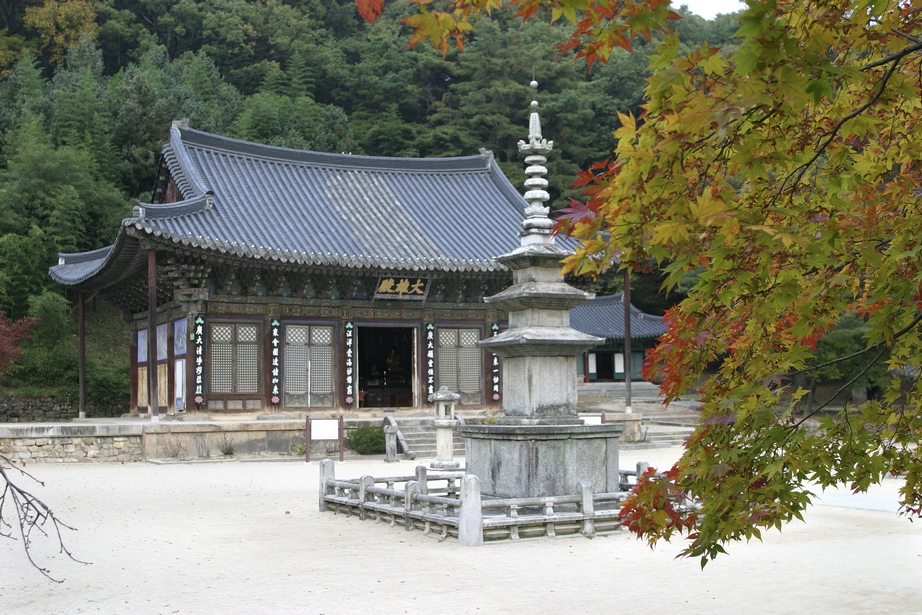

== See also ==
- Hinduism in Korea
- Korean Buddhism
- Korean Buddhist temples
- List of Buddhist temples
- Korean architecture
