= Banyasa =

Buddhist temple in South Korea

- 반야사
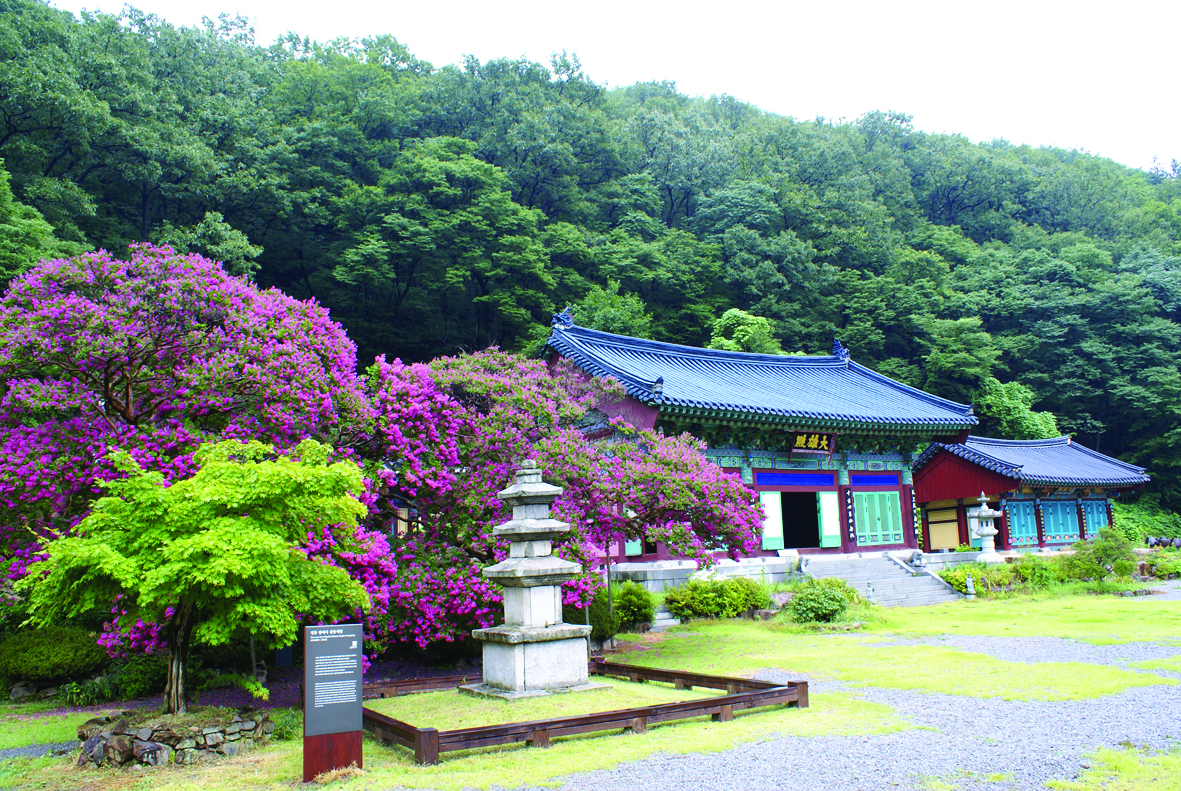
- Banyasa Temple in South Korea

Religion
- Affiliation: Jogye Order

Location
- Location: 652 Baekhwasan-ro Hwanggan-myeon Yeongdong-gun North Chungcheong Province (Korean: 충청북도 영동군 황간면 백화산로 652)
- Country: South Korea
- Interactive map of Banyasa
- Coordinates: 35°16′50.5″N 127°54′33.7″E

Banyasa (Korean: 반야사; Hanja: 般若寺) is a Buddhist temple of the Jogye Order in Chungcheong Province, South Korea.

== History ==
Banyasa is said to have been established in 720 by Wonhyo or by Sangwon, one of Uisang's ten major disciples, but there are no records to confirm this. Another account states that National Preceptor Muyeom was its founder. While Muyeom resided at Simmyo-sa in Yeongdong County, he dispatched a novice monk named Sunin to the temple site to expel the evil dragon living in the pond. Ven. Sunin then established Banyasa Temple after filling in the pond.

The name “Banyasa” derives from a plaque that Sejo of Joseon wrote during the inauguration ceremony for the temple's reconstruction. Banyasa Temple was scheduled to open when King Sejo came to see Sinmi Daesa at Bokcheonam on Songnisan. King Sejo healed his own skin problems at Banyasa Temple, as he did at Sangwonsa Temple on Mt. Odaesan, thanks to the blessing of the child Manjusri. Afterward, he named the temple Banya "perfection of wisdom", and even wrote its plaque, which is still preserved.

== Landscape ==
Banyasa Temple's only designated heritage, the Three-Story Stone Pagoda (Treasure No. 1371), was relocated in 1950 from the so-called “Tapbeol,” situated in the Seokcheon Valley north of Banyasa Temple. Thus, the pagoda doesn't provide any reliable information about the temple's history. In addition, the Buddha triad enshrined in the Main Buddha Hall, and the two monk's stupas are designated Regional Cultural Heritage of Yeongdong-gun No. 9, No. 10, No. 11 and No. 12, in that order.

== Cultural properties ==
Taegeuk-Shaped Terrain and a Tiger

In front of Banyasa Temple, Gusucheon Stream, fed by water from Mt. Baekhwasan, forms an S-shape, which some people see as a “taegeuk.” (symbol of great polarity or yin-yang). In the center of the stream rises a lotus bud-shaped piece of land, on which Banyasa Temple seems to lean. The temple's Munsujeon Hall perches atop a 100-meter-high cliff that overlooks the stream. The Hall reminds visitors they are in the sanctuary of Manjusri Bodhisattva.

Behind Banyasa Temple is a popular 300 meter long scree-rockslide that creates an image of a tiger about to leap. To attract more tourists Yeongdong-gun County recently established a photo zone from where visitors can take good pictures with the tiger's outline clearly seen in the background. The tiger's image is, geomantically, in the right place in these remote mountains, part of the Baekdu-daegan, the 460-mile-long mountain range that runs north and south the length of the Korean Peninsula.

== Tourism ==
It also offers temple stay programs where visitors can experience Buddhist culture.

== Gallery ==
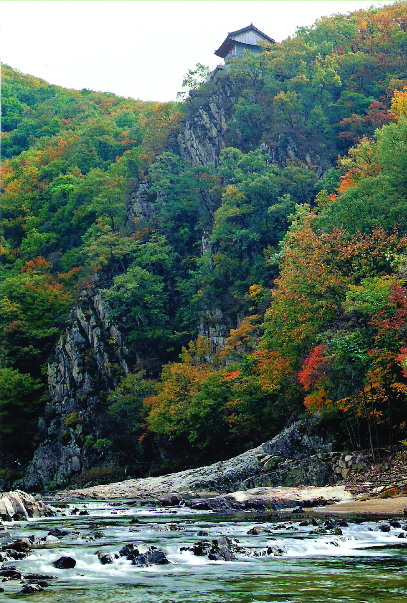

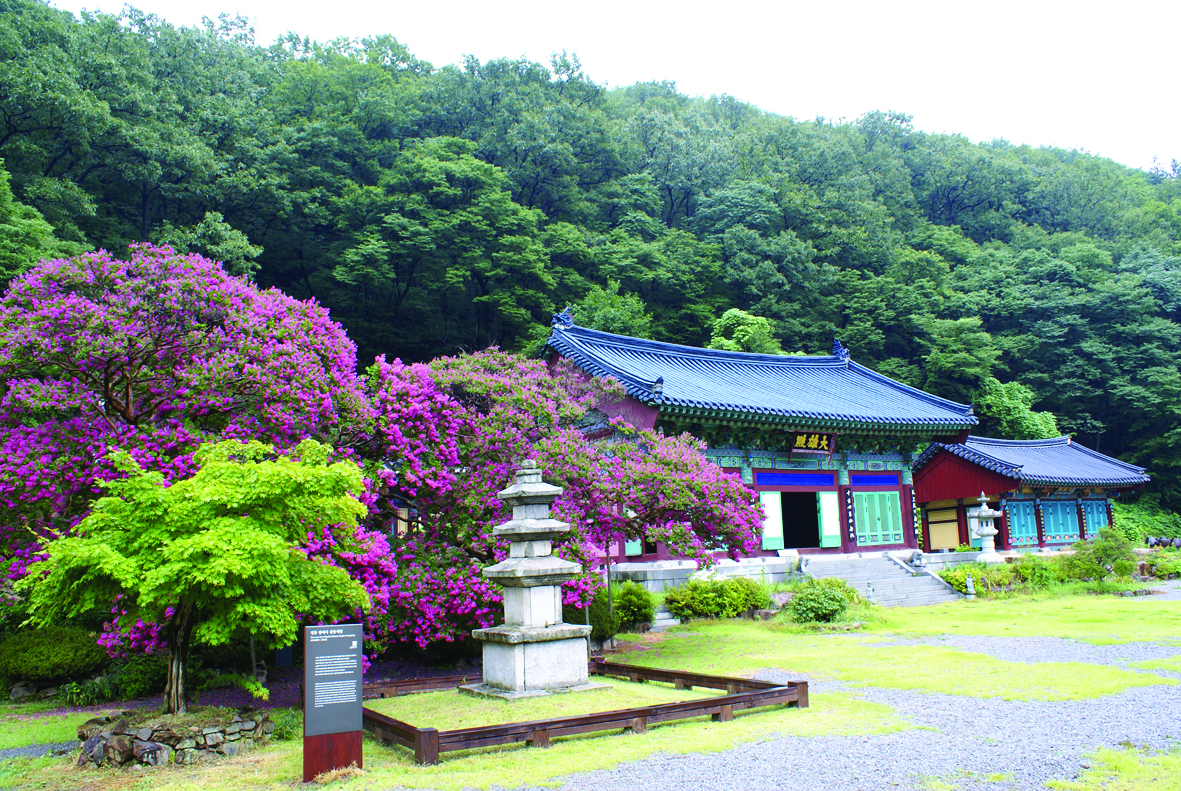

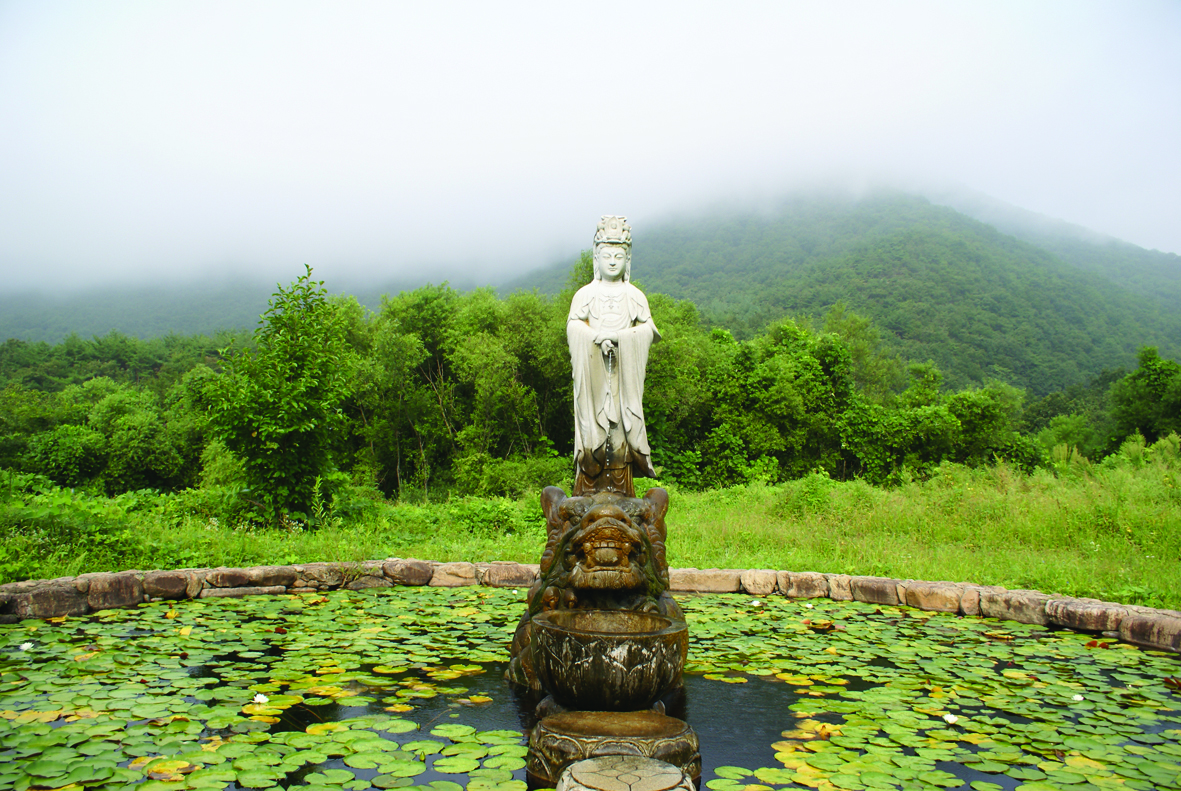

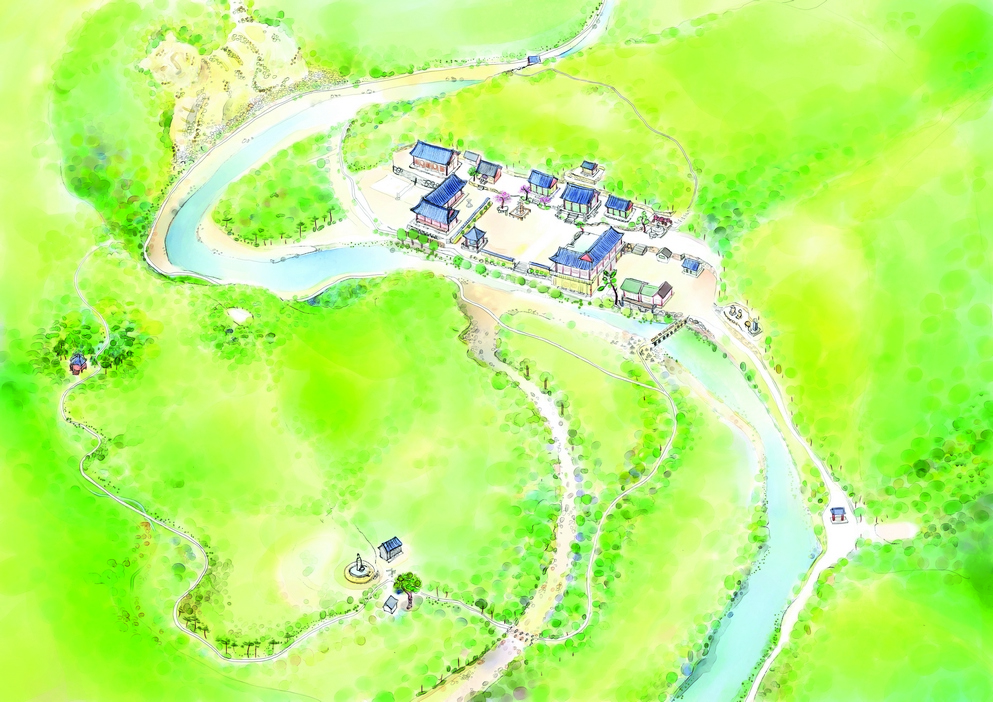
