= Tongbulgyo =

Buddhist school taught by Wonhyo

- Hangul: 통불교
- Hanja: 通佛敎
- RR: Tongbulgyo
- MR: T'ongbulgyo

Tongbulgyo is a school of "interpenetrated Buddhism" which was taught by the Korean monk Wonhyo.

== See also ==
- Ijangui
- Essence-Function
- Buddhism in Korea
- Traditional Korean thought
