= David Bannon =

American fraudster

David Dilley Bannon
- David Bannon speaking at The University of Colorado Boulder
- Born: David Wayne Dilley; April 22, 1963 (age 63); Tacoma, Washington, U.S.
- Occupations: Author, translator
- Children: 1

David Race Bannon or David Dilley Bannon (born David Wayne Dilley; April 22, 1963) is an American author, lecturer, curator and translator, best known for the books Race Against Evil, Elements of Subtitles and Wounded in Spirit. Bannon was a university lecturer for two decades and the curator of Asian art for the Florence Museum of Art and History in South Carolina. He has written on many subjects and also had numerous TV appearances and interviews. However, in 2006, he was charged and convicted of criminal impersonation for inventing his personal history, which was also the basis for his book Race Against Evil. Bannon was sentenced to five years and released after three.

== Early life and education ==
David Wayne Dilley was born in Tacoma, Washington, and grew up in Spokane Valley, Washington. The son of photographer Dennis Dilley, he left home at age 19, spending many years in Asia.

== Career ==
Bannon was a college lecturer for two decades Bannon writes and speaks on art, history, culture, computer technology, business and translation. Bannon has appeared on A&E, The Discovery Channel (1997), The History Channel, Ancient Mysteries (1997), In Search of History (1999), On the Inside (2001), TechTV (2003) and History's Mysteries (2006). He has been interviewed by NPR, Fox News and The Wall Street Journal.

From 1987 to 1988, Bannon taught at Guilford Technical Community College in North Carolina. From 1992 to 1994, Bannon was the curator of Asian art for the then Florence Museum of Art and History in South Carolina, USA.

He has also written in Korean. His original Korean-language poems and translations of Korean poetry and spirituality texts have appeared in consumer magazines, trade publications and academic journals. Bannon has also published two collections of the writings of Korean Zen master Bopjong.

Bannon translated Korean-to-English subtitles for YA Entertainment and the Munhwa Broadcasting Corporation. He has translated subtitles for 44 South Korean television shows. Bannon has also carried out German to English translation, most notably including the works of Friedrich Rückert.

== Change of name ==
Bannon adopted his new name, David Race Bannon, from a character on 60s animated television show Jonny Quest.

Jessica Autumn Bannon Memorial Film Collection in Chester, South Carolina (2017).

== Impersonation trial ==
Bannon was arrested in Boulder, Colorado, on January 27, 2006, on the charges of criminal impersonation, computer crime, and attempted theft. The charges levelled against him asserted that he created a fraudulent personal history, including being an Interpol agent - the subject of his book Race Against Evil - and that he earned fees for training and speaking engagements on the basis of this history. Bannon pleaded guilty and was sentenced to five years. He serve three years before being released in June 2009.

== Personal life ==
Married twice, Bannon had one child, Jessica Autumn Bannon. She died in 2015 of a fentanyl-laced heroin overdose. After his daughter's death, Bannon and his wife established the Jessica Autumn Bannon Memorial Film Collection. The bulk of the collection is housed in the Chester County Library in Chester, South Carolina.

== Filmography ==
=== Television series ===
Year	Title	Writer: Subtitle Translator	Notes	Network
2002	Sunlight Upon Me	Yes	16 episodes	MBC TV
2006	Love Truly	Yes	34 episodes	MBC TV
2007	Time Between Dog and Wolf	Yes	16 episodes	MBC TV
2008-2009	East of Eden	Yes	24 episodes	MBC TV
2009	Queen of Housewives	Yes	20 episodes	MBC TV
2009	Queen Seondeok	Yes	62 episodes	MBC TV
2010	Personal Taste	Yes	16 episodes	MBC TV
2010	Playful Kiss	Yes	16 episodes	MBC TV
2010	Dong Yi	Yes	50 episodes	MBC TV
2010	Home Sweet Home	Yes	16 episodes	MBC TV
2010-2011	Queen of Reversals	Yes	31 episodes	MBC TV
2011	You're So Pretty	Yes	1 episode	MBC TV
2011	Royal Family	Yes	18 episodes	MBC TV
2011	The Duo	Yes	32 episodes	MBC TV
2011	The Greatest Love	Yes	16 episodes	MBC TV
2011	Heartstrings	Yes	3 episodes	MBC TV
2011	Miss Ripley	Yes	16 episodes	MBC TV
2011	Can't Lose	Yes	18 episodes	MBC TV
2011	Me Too, Flower!	Yes	15 episodes	MBC TV
2011	Gyebaek	Yes	36 episodes	MBC TV
2011-2012	Lights and Shadows	Yes	64 episodes	MBC TV
2012	Golden Time	Yes	10 episodes	MBC TV
2012	God of War	Yes	56 episodes	MBC TV
2012-2013	Rascal Sons	Yes	50 episodes	MBC TV
2012-2013	The King's Doctor	Yes	50 episodes	MBC TV
2013	Hur Jun, The Original Story	Yes	135 episodes	MBC TV
2013	Goddess of Fire	Yes	32 episodes	MBC TV
2013-2014	The King's Daughter, Soo Baek-hyang	Yes	108 episodes	MBC TV
2013-2014	Empress Ki	Yes	51 episodes	MBC TV
2014	Triangle	Yes	26 episodes	MBC TV
2014	Mother's Garden	Yes	126 episodes	MBC TV
2014	Diary of a Night Watchman	Yes	24 episodes	MBC TV
2014-2015	Pride and Prejudice	Yes	21 episodes	MBC TV
2014-2015	Apgujeong Midnight Sun	Yes	67 episodes	MBC TV
2015	Splendid Politics	Yes	50 episodes	MBC TV
2015-2016	Glamorous Temptation	Yes	50 episodes	MBC TV
2016	W	Yes	2 episodes	MBC TV
2016	Monster	Yes	50 episodes	MBC TV
2016	Flowers of the Prison	Yes	51 episodes	MBC TV
2016-2017	Father, I'll Take Care of You	Yes	50 episodes	MBC TV
2017	Bad Thief, Good Thief	Yes	50 episodes	MBC TV
2013-2019	Mystery Television	Yes	37 episodes	MBC TV

=== Appearance credits ===
Date	Title	Episode	Network	Notes
May 22, 1997	Ancient Mysteries	"Samurai"	A&E	Season 4, Episode 19
December 17, 1997	"The Secrets of the Warrior's Power"	—N/a	Discovery Channel	Documentary film
1999	In Search of History	"Samurai Warrior"	History Channel	Season 2, Episode 5
January 5, 2001	On the Inside	"Secrets of the Warrior's Power"	Discovery Channel	Season 3
June 30, 2003	Unscrewed with Martin Sargent	—N/a	TechTV	Season 1, Episode 20
2006	History's Mysteries	"Samurai Warrior"	History Channel	Season 15, Episode 7

== Works ==
- Introduction to Windows 95/98 (Prentice Hall, 2000)
- Internet & World Wide Web: How To Program Second Edition (contributing editor; Prentice Hall; 2000), ISBN 0130308978
- e-Business & e-Commerce: How To Program (contributing editor; Prentice Hall; 2001)
- Race Against Evil: The Secret Missions of the Interpol Agent Who Tracked the World's Most Sinister Criminals A Real-life Drama (New Horizon Press; 2006), ISBN 0882822314
- Korean-English/English-Korean Standard Dictionary (Hippocrene Standard Dictionary) (Hippocrene Books, 2009), editor; ISBN 9780781812344
- The Elements of Subtitles: A Practical Guide to the Art of Dialogue, Character, Context, Tone and Style in Subtitling (2010), Third edition, 2013; ISBN 9781300667155, see Goodreads listing
- Meditations of a Zen Master (editor and translator; Bilingual Library, 2012), ISBN 1300327405, see Goodreads listing.
- Meditations of a Korean Monk (editor and translator; Bilingual Library, 2012), ISBN 1105519201, see Goodreads listing
- Between Fighting Men: Nostalgia and B-Westerns (2013), published in conjunction with the Chester Library film, exhibit and lecture series ISBN 9781300897736
- Darker Than Anywhere: Korean War Reminiscences, (editor; Bilingual Library, 2015); ISBN 9781329686809
- Wounded in Spirit: Advent Art and Meditations, foreword by Philip Yancey (Paraclete Press, 2018); ISBN 9781640601451
- Songs on the Death of Children: Selected Poems from Kindertotenlieder, foreword by Cornelia Kallisch (McFarland & Company, 2022); ISBN 9781476690421
- "The Elements of Subtitles: A Practical Guide to the Art of Dialogue, Character, Context, Tone and Style in Subtitling, Third edition (2013)", see Goodreads.com listing
- “Poetry of the Grave: Japanese Warrior Art & Culture,” Florence Museum, 3 Nov 1994; see “Japanese Samurai Warriors,” Florence Museum Express, Vol. 4, No. 4 (1994): 1.
- “Redefining Traditional Feudal Ethics in Japan during the Meiji Restoration,” Asian Pacific Quarterly, Vol. 26, No. 1 (1994): 27–35
- Chinese Medicine: From Temples to Taoism,” T’ai Chi, Vol. 20, No. 3 (1996): 28-33
- “Balancing the Yang and Yin: Development and Contributions of Chinese Medicine,” Asian Pacific Quarterly, Vol. 26, No. 2 (1994): 22–37
- Dracula's Art of War: A Martial Portrait of Vlad III Tepes, 15th Century,” Kungfu, (November, 2000): 18-19, 58-59.
- "Unique Korean Cultural Concepts in Interpersonal Relations", Translation Journal, Vol. 12, No. 1. Translationjournal.net. 1941-11-20. Retrieved 2019-08-21.
- “Building a QBasic Database,” DOS Resource Guide, No. 6 (International Data Group, 1992): 65–69; “Point and Click Opera,” Opera News, Vol. 62, No. 5 (1997): 48–49.
- “Negotiating with Asians,” PurchasingWorld, Vol. 34, No. 8 (1990): 54–55.
- "Grammaticality, Ungrammaticality, and Usage-based Theory in Film Subtitles," Translation Journal, Vol. 17, No. 2. Translationjournal.net. Retrieved 2019-08-21.
- "Tonality in Subtitle Translation", Translation Journal, Vol. 14, No. 4". Translationjournal.net. Retrieved 2019-08-21.
- "The Role of Trans-modal Translation in Global Cinema", Translation Journal, Vol. 14, No. 2. Translationjournal.net. Retrieved 2019-08-21.
- "$#*! My Translator Says: Cursing in Subtitles". The ATA Chronicle. Vol XL (1), pp 30–34 (2011).
- "Hangul Herald, Summer 2010: 8" (PDF). Retrieved 2019-08-21. Archived from the original (PDF) on 2 November 2020.
- “Nostalgia for Korea: A Sijo Journey.” Asian Pacific Quarterly, Vol 25, No 1 (1993): 73–76.
- “Training with the Sages,” Mudo Dojang, Fall 1994: 26–29
- “Who Were the Hwarang?,” Mudo Dojang, April 1996: 59–63
- “Philosophy of Korean Masters,” World of Martial Arts, June 1998: 54–57
- “Yi Sunshin’s War Diary,” Mudo Dojang, Spring 1994: 54–59; 70–72.
- "Sijo Poetry of Korean Kisaeng," Hangul Herald, Fall 2008: 10-13 (PDF). Archived from the original (PDF) on November 2, 2020.
- "Unique Cultural Values as Reflected in Korean Proverbs", Hangul Herald, Summer 2009: 13-18 (PDF). Retrieved 2019-08-21. Archived from the original (PDF) on 15 Jul 2023
- “Korean Sijo Poems,” Hawai’i Pacific Review (Hawai’i Pacific University), Vol. 4 (1989): 1, 26, 49.
- "Meditations of a Korean Monk (Bilingual Library, 2012)". Goodreads.com. Retrieved 2019-08-21.
- Bannon, David, "For Advent I", Paraclete Press (2018)
