= Ryu Shiva =

South Korean poet (born 1959)

- Born: Ryu Shiva; 1959; Okcheon County

Ryu Shiva (born 1959) is a South Korean poet and literary critic.

== Biography ==
Ryu Shiva was born in 1959 in Okcheon, Chungcheongbuk-do. His birth name is An Jaechan. He attended Kyung Hee University for Korean literature on a creative writing scholarship. When he was in his second year of university, he won the Korea Times's "New Writer's Contest" with a poem called "Achim" (아침, which translates to "morning" in English). From 1980 to 1982, he was a member of 'Siundong' with Park Deokgyu, Lee Moon-jae, Ha Jaebong, and Nam Jinwoo. In 1983 he left the group and concentrated on translating various meditation books.

Since 1988, Ryu Shiva has lived in meditation centers throughout the United States and India, and translated major works of Rajneesh. He has published poetry collections such as Even Though You Are Next To Me I Miss You (Geudaega gyeot-e itseodo naneun geudaega geuripda 그대가 곁에 있어도 나는 그대가 그립다; 1991) and The Love of the One-eyed Fish (Oenunbak-i mulgogi-ui sarang 외눈박이 물고기의 사랑; 1996).

Every winter he travels to India and records his experiences. Two works that derive from his travels in India include A Trip To the Sky Lake (Haneul hosuro tteonan yeohaeng 하늘 호수로 떠난 여행; 1997), and Jigubyeol Yeohaengja (지구별 여행자 The Earth Traveler; 2002).

Ryu Shiva transitioned into the translation of meditation books, and then moved to publishing collections of proverbs. His major collections of proverbs include Flowers Blossom in the Mountains (산에는 꽃이 피네) which is a compilation of Beopjeong Sunim's Buddhist verses and proverbs; May All Beings Be Happy (살아 있는 것은 다 행복하라; 2006); as well as proverb poetry collections If I Had Known Then What I Know Now (Jigeum algo itneungeol geuttaedo alatdeoramyeon 지금 알고 있는걸 그때도 알았더라면; 1998) and Love, As If You've Never Been Hurt Before (Saranghara hanbeondo sangcheobatji aneun geotcheoreom 사랑하라 한번도 상처받지 않은 것처럼; 2008).

== Writing ==
Through the critical essay collection Babeltapui eoneo (바벨탑의 언어 Language of the Tower of Babel) poet and literary critic Nam Jinwoo has commented on Ryu Shiva's poetic style

"The movement of imagination, which is the most important element in An Jaechan's (Ryu Shiva) poetry, is the tension between two forces. One that wants to expand externally, and one that attempts to pull in internally. The latter is always at an advantage over the former. There is a possibility for his work to be criticized as escapism by populists who argue for active participation in reality. Today, when everyone is busy looking forward and moving ahead, in his low voice that sings 'return to where you came from' there is a lot of meaning to take that we can listen to."

Ryu Shiva's book Geudaega gyeot-e itseodo naneun geudaega geuripda (그대가 곁에 있어도 나는 그대가 그립다 Even Though You Are Next To Me I Miss You) was on the bestseller list 21 times between 1989 and 1998, and in a survey on 530 university students done by Opening The World With Poetry (시로 여는 세상) for their 2002 Summer issue, he was selected as the most liked poet along with Yun Dong-Ju, Kim Sowol, and Han Yong-un.

== Works ==
=== Poetry collections ===
- Geudaega gyeot-e itseodo naneun geudaega geuripda (그대가 곁에 있어도 나는 그대가 그립다 Even Though You Are Next To Me I Miss You) Pureunsup, 1991.
- Oenunbak-i mulgogi-ui sarang (외눈박이 물고기의 사랑 The Love of the One-eyed Fish), Yeollimwon, 1996.
- Saranghara hanbeondo sangcheobatji aneun geotcheoreom (사랑하라 한번도 상처받지 않은 것처럼 Love, As If You've Never Been Hurt Before), Oraedoen mirae, 2008.
- Na-ui sangcheoneun dol neo-ui sangcheoneun kkot (나의 상처는 돌 너의 상처는 꽃 My Wound is Stone Your Wound is Flower), Forest of Literature, 2012.

=== Meditation Books ===
- Jigeum algo itneungeol geuttaedo alatdeoramyeon (지금 알고 있는걸 그때도 알았더라면 If I Had Known Then What I Know Now) Yoellimwon, 1998.
- Mindeullereul saranghaneun beob (민들레를 사랑하는 법 How to Love a Dandelion), Namusimneunsaram, 1999.

=== Essay Collections ===
- Sarmi na-ege gareucheojun geotdeul (삶이 나에게 가르쳐준 것들 Things That Life Taught Me), Pureunsup, 2000.
- Ttakjeongbeolle – salaitneun modeun geotdeule daehan byeolnan saenggak (딱정벌레 – 살아있는 모든 것들에 대한 별난 생각 The Beetle – Strange thoughts on all living things)
- Dalsaeneun dalman saenggakhanda (달새는 달만 생각한다 The Moon Bird Only Thinks of the Moon)
- Haneulhosuro tteonan yeohaeng (하늘호수로 떠난 여행 A Trip to the Sky Lake), Yeollimwon, 1997.
- Jigubyeol Yeohaengja (지구별 여행자 The Earth Traveler), Gimmyoung, 2002.
- Naneun woe neoga amigo nainga (나는 왜 너가 아니고 나인가 Why am I Me and Not You), Gimmyoung, 2003.
- Baekman gwangnyeonui godok sokeseo hanjului sireul ilda (백만 광년의 고독 속에서 한줄의 시를 읽다 Reading a Line of Poetry Within the Loneliness of a Million Light Years), Alchemist, 2014.
- Saeneun nalagamyeonseo dwidolaboji anneunda (새는 날아가면서 뒤돌아보지 않는다 Birds Don't Look Back While Flying), The Sup, 2017.

=== Works in Translation ===
- May All Beings Be Happy: The Selected Dharma Sayings of Beop Jeong, ed. Shiva Ryu, trans. Matty Wegehaupt (The Good Life, 2006), ISBN 8995757736
- 窮人的幸福 (Chinese)
- 穷人的幸福 (Chinese)
- Voyage au pays du lac céleste (French)
- 君がそばにいても僕は君が恋しい (Japanese)
- 地球星の旅人: インドの風に吹かれて (Japanese)

== Awards ==
- 2012 Kyunghee Literature Prize
