= Beophwagye =

Buddhist denomination in South Korea

- Hangul: 법화계
- Hanja: 法華系
- RR: Beophwagye
- MR: Pŏphwagye

Beophwagye (Korean: 법화계; Korean: [pʌ̹.pʰwa̠.ɡ(j)e̞]) is a collective designition of new religious movements within Buddhism in South Korea that started in the 20th century. It refers to modern Buddhist religious organizations that treat the Lotus Sutra translated by Kumārajīva as the central sutra (Korean: 소의경전, 所依經典) with the option to accept two other related sutras (Note: Together with the Lotus Sutra, the other two sutras are Innumerable Meanings Sutra and Samantabhadra Meditation Sutra that collectively form the Threefold Lotus Sutra.) or other sutras, particularly the Avataṃsaka Sūtra, a traditionally popular sutra among Korean Buddhists. Beophwagye denotes the nominalized Sino-Korean expression that means based on (teachings of) the Lotus Sutra. A modern Buddhist organization based in South Korea that centers around the teachings of the Lotus Sutra is called Beophwagye jongdan (Korean: 법화계 종단, 法華系 宗團). Most of the Beophwagye jongdan with large numbers of followers follow the Buddhist doctrines with influence from Nichiren Buddhism during the colonial rule under the Empire of Japan.

== History ==
The Korean localization of Tiantai, the original Cheontae school of Buddhism that is based on the understanding of the teachings of the Lotus Sutra was present during the Goryeo. However, Buddhism was persecuted during the Joseon dynasty and the teaching of the Cheontae school of Buddhism collapsed.

Buddhism based on the teachings of the Lotus Sutra and Tiantai philosophy (Note: Japanese Tendai Buddhism was present in Korea during the Japanese colonial rule.) became available during the Japanese colonial administration of Korea. Korean Buddhism at that time also had to compete with propagation from religious groups such as Japanese Buddhism, Christianity, and Shinto. For example, the Nichiren-based Buddhist sects in Korea at that time mostly had Japanese people, as shown in the chart below with the numbers of followers in late December of 1939.

| Nichiren Buddhist Sects in Korea | Number of Followers in Korea (both Japanese and Koreans) | Number of Korean Followers in Korea |
|---|---|---|
| Nichiren-shū | 17,633 | 73 |
| Hokke-shū (Note: It is called Hokke-shū Jinmon-ryū today.) | 1,684 | 0 |
| Honmon Hokke-shū (Note: It is a former merging of Honmon Butsuryū-shū, Honmon Hokke-shū that is based in Uboku-san Myōren-ji in Kyoto, and Hokke-shū Honmon-ryū that is based in both Kyoto and Tokyo.) | 6,859 | 1,056 |
| Kempon Hokke-shū | 449 | 14 |
| Fuju-fuse (Note: It is called Nichiren-shū Fuju-fuse-ha that is based in Myōgaku-ji in Okayama today.) | 137 | 0 |
| Total | 26,762 | 1,143 |

It was the 20th century Korean Buddhist monk, Hye-un (Korean: 혜운, 惠雲), who first created the modern day Beophwagye jongdan in Korea. (Note: Born in 1898 and died in May 1947, his secular name Kim Jeong-un (Korean: 김정운, 金正雲)) He was the leading Korean person during the Japanese colonial period to study the Lotus Sutra as understood by Nichiren priests of his time. His greatest influences were two Japanese Buddhist priests: one from Honmon Butsuryū-shū and the other one from Honmon Hokke-shū.

There were conferences for the purpose of creating a modern Korean Buddhist tradition centered around the Lotus Sutra during the later part of the Japanese colonialism under Hye-un. After the Korean independence, Daeseung Bulgyo Beophwahoe (Korean: 대승불교법화회, 大乘佛敎法華會) (Note: It means the Lotus Sutra Society/Organization of Mahayana Buddhism.) was created under his leadership in 1945. Its goal was to Korean-ize the Nichiren Buddhist doctrine and practices. However, the death of Hye-un negatively affected the operation of Daeseung Bulgyo Beophwahoe that later created Buddhist orders led by his subordinates that later became five major Beophwagye jondan today.

There are other Beophwagye jongdan that did not root in Hye-un's involvements. The prominent examples are Yeongsan Beophwa Order of Korean Buddhism (Korean: 대한불교영산법화종) (Note: Its Korean founder was trained under Nipponzan-Myōhōji-Daisanga.) and the revived Cheontae Order of Korean Buddhism (Korean: 대한불교천태종). However, the Cheontae Order that currently exists today can arguably be classified as a Tiantai-based Buddhist order similar to how Tendai Buddhism in Japan is its own classification.

== List of Beophwagye jongdan ==
There are numerous organizations pertaining to the doctrinal understanding based on the teachings of the Lotus Sutra today.

- Daeseung Bulgyo Beophwahoe (Korean: 대승불교법화회, 大乘佛敎法華會)
  - Gwaneum Order of Korean Buddhism (Korean: 대한불교관음종, 大韓佛敎觀音宗) (Note: It was originally called the Bulip Order of Korean Buddhism (Korean: 대한불교관음종, 大韓佛敎佛入宗). It also adopts the 80-volume Avataṃsaka Sūtra as its additional central sutra.)
    - Bulip Order of Korean Buddhism (Korean: 대한불교불입종, 大韓佛敎佛入宗)
  - Beophwa Order of Korean Buddhism [Daehan] (Korean: 대한불교법화종, 大韓佛敎法華宗)
  - Ilseung Order of Korean Buddhism (Korean: 대한불교일승종, 大韓佛敎一乘宗)
  - Beophwa Order of Korean Buddhism [Hanguk] (Korean: 한국불교법화종, 韓國佛敎法華宗)
- Bomun Order of Korean Buddhism (Korean: 대한불교보문종, 大韓佛敎普門宗) (Note: It is the only Buddhist order in South Korea that consists of nuns instead of monks. This Buddhist order is also particular for having the a single chapter (chapter twenty-five) of the Lotus Sutra as its central sutra while accepting other sutras as minor sutras.)
- Bulseung Order of Korean Buddhism (Korean: 대한불교불승종, 大韓佛敎佛乘宗)
- Yeonhwa Order of Korean Buddhism (Korean: 대한불교연화종, 大韓佛敎蓮華宗)
- Yeongsan Beophwa Order of Korean Buddhism (Korean: 대한불교영산법화종, 大韓佛敎靈山法華宗)
- Cheontae Order of Korean Buddhism (Korean: 대한불교천태종, 大韓佛敎天台宗)
- Yeore Order of Korean Buddhism (Korean: 한국불교여래종, 韓國佛敎如來宗)

== Influence of Nichiren Buddhism impacted today ==
Just like Nichiren-shū, Beophwagye jongdan express no discrimination between the Jeokmun (Korean: 적문 section, 迹門) (Note: It is also called Shakumon (迹門) in Japanese, it refers to the first fourteen chapters of the Lotus Sutra.) and Bonmun (Korean: 본문, 本門) (Note: It is also called Honmon (本門) in Japanese, it refers to the later fourteen chapters of the Lotus Sutra.) sections of the Lotus Sutra, in accordance to the itchiha (一致派) approach in Nichiren Buddhism. (Note: For example, in today's case of Gwaneum Order of Korean Buddhism, Nichiren's reverence of the second chapter (in the Shakumon section) and the sixteenth chapter (in the Honmon section) of the Lotus Sutra is still important.)

Nichiren Buddhist organizations such as Honmon Butsuryū-shū and Nichiren-shū exist in South Korea. However, Honmon Butsuryū-shū has weakened its presence and only one Nichiren-shū temple exists.

Nichiren Shōshū also exists in South Korea, although it has a negative public image. (Note: Nichiren Shōshū in South Korea is known for promoting chinilpa position in Korean history.)
