= Hyeonjeong non =

15th century Korean essay

- Hangul: 현정론
- Hanja: 顯正論
- RR: Hyeonjeongnon
- MR: Hyŏnjŏngnon

Hyeonjeong non (Korean: 현정론; Hanja: 顯正論; lit. Exposition of the Correct) was an essay written at the beginning of the Joseon period, defending Buddhism against the attacks of a rising antagonistic Neo-Confucian movement. It was written in a single fascicle, by the Korean Buddhist monk Gihwa (1376-1433).

== See also ==
- Korean philosophy
- Korean Buddhism
- Korean Confucianism
