= Beopseongge =

The Beopseongge (Korean: 법성게; Hanja: 法性偈) or Hwaeom ilseung beopgye do (Diagram of the Avataṃsaka Single Vehicle Dharmadhātu) (Korean: 화엄일승법계도; Hanja: 華嚴一乘法界圖) is a Buddhist text created by Uisang, Korean monk of the Silla period. The title is rendered in English as "The Song of Dharma Nature". This monumental script is widely known in Korean Seon Buddhism and Japanese Zen and Chinese Chan. Beopseongge is recorded on not only Tripitaka Koreana in Korea but Taishō Tripiṭaka in Japan.

== Chart Stamp ==
The chart is written in 210 letters only. And letters are placed in 54 squared maze shaped chart that has no end. Since this maze shaped chart was made with the symbols and meanings of dharma and dharani, some monks used as mystic stamp like talisman for lay people.

This type of gatha was widely used in Tang dynasty China and Silla dynasty Korea. It was the time when wooden block printing carved with maze shape and poem on it, called 'Bansi (盤詩)', was flourished.

Recently used as logo of Haeinsa, one of the Triple Gem (the Buddha, the Dharma and the Sangha) temples in South Korea. The name or the temple 'Haein' also came from the gatha's 'Hae-in samadhi'.

== Gatha ==
The gatha describes the dharma nature, written in 30 rows of 7 words in Chinese.

Uisang was deeply influenced by the Hwaeom Sutra (Avatamsaka Sutra, the Huayen Sutra). He wrote this gatha while he was attending the lecture of Hwaeom Sutra in Tang dynasty China. As Original title of this chart, this gatha written precisely and concisely written for the essence of the Hwaeom Sutra.

== Full text ==
1. The Nature of the Dharma embraces everything;
  there is nothing besides this,
2. Hence the manifestations of the Mind are unmoving
  and so, fundamentally quiet.
3. There is neither name nor form,
  everything is cut;
4. Without experiencing enlightenment
  you cannot know.
5. Original Nature is unfathomable
  and sublime;
6. It never remains the same, but
  manifests according to affinities.
7. In the One there is the Many;
  Many is included in the One,
8. One is the Many;
  Many is the One.
9. A speck of dust
  Swallows the universe;
10. Each and every speck of dust
  Is also like this.
11. Countless kalpas
  are one thought;
12. One thought
  is countless kalpas.
13. The Nine Periods,
  the Ten Periods are like one
14. But remaining distinct.
  This is mysterious and sublime.
15. The first thought
  is enlightenment,
16. Samsara and Nirvana
  are not two,
17. The material world, the spiritual world
  is Just-like-this, without discrimination.
18. The ten Buddhas and Samantabhadra Bodhisattva
  always dwell in this great state of the Mahayana.
19. From the Hae-in Samadhi(Sāgaramudrā-samādhi) of Buddha
20. Unimaginable abilities come forth at will,
21. The Dharma, akin to precious treasures,
  rains upon sentient beings
22. Then depending on the vessel
  the individual receives the Dharma accordingly.
23. So if anyone wants
  to relish the original state
24. Without letting go of delusions,
  they will never succeed.
25. Free from past karmic ties
  saints use wise expedients,
26. They make each and everyone content
  in their Original Home.
27. Bodhisattvas use this Dhāraṇī
  like a bottomless treasure chest
28. To decorate and glorify
  Dharmadhātu, the palace of the Mind.
29. Sit down in your
  Original Place and see
30. That everything is
  as it is, like Buddha of old.
