= Korean Buddhism =

Form of Buddhism native to Korea and practiced around the world

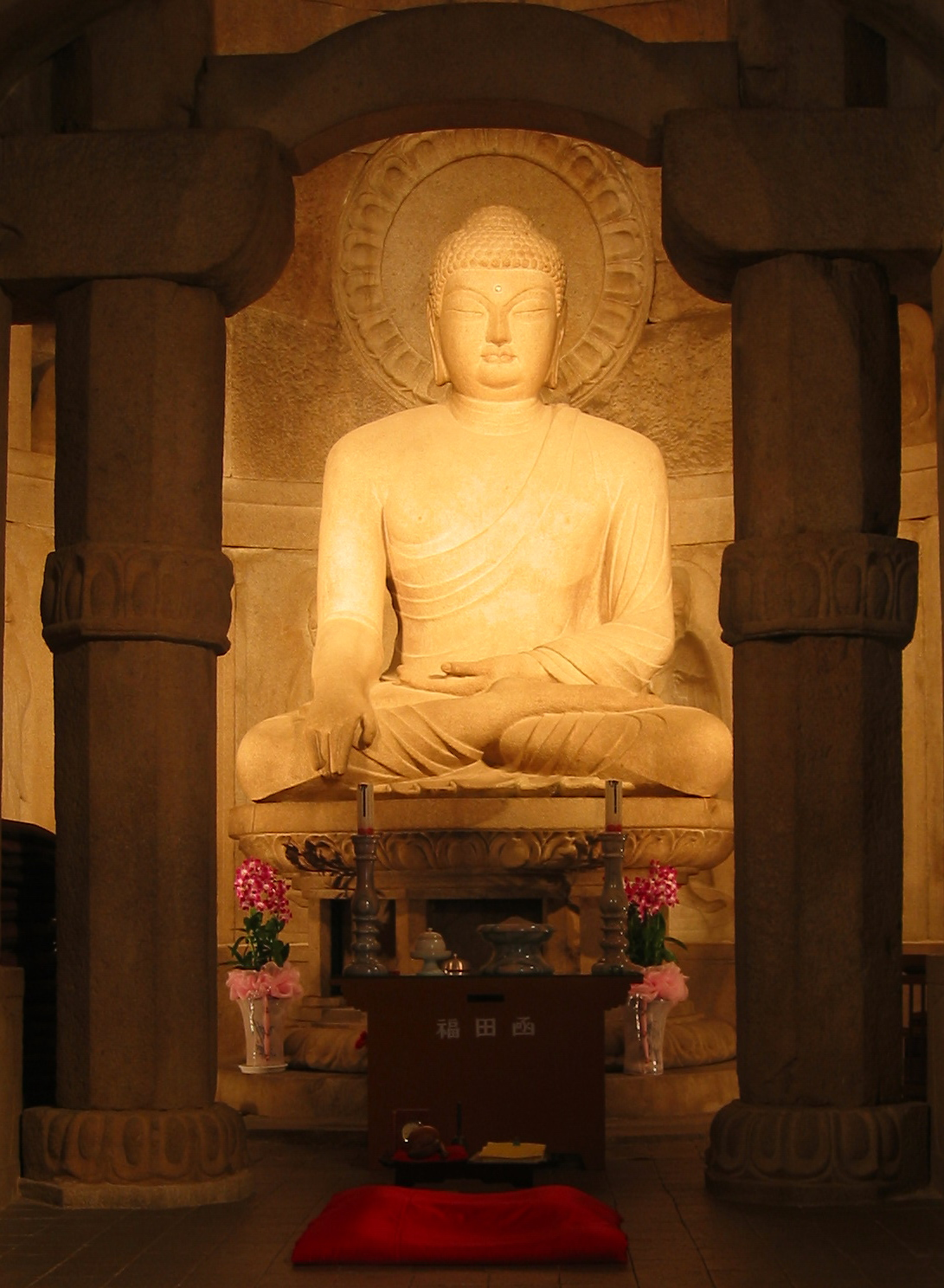
An image of Gautama Buddha at Seokguram Grotto, Gyeongju, in South Korea

Korean Buddhism began in the 4th century CE during the Three Kingdoms Period. Centuries after Buddhism originated in India, the Mahayana tradition arrived in China through the Silk Road in the 1st century CE, then entered the Korean peninsula in the 4th century, from where it was transmitted to Japan. In Korea, it was adopted as the state religion of 3 constituent polities of the Three Kingdoms Period, first by the Goguryeo (also known as Goryeo) in 372 CE, by the Silla (Gaya) in 528 CE, and by the Baekje in 552 CE.

Korean Buddhism is distinguished from other forms of Buddhism by its attempt to resolve what its early practitioners saw as inconsistencies within the Mahayana Buddhist traditions that they received from foreign countries. To address this, they developed a new holistic approach to Buddhism that became a distinct form, an approach characteristic of virtually all major Korean thinkers. The resulting variation is called Tongbulgyo ("interpenetrated Buddhism"), a form that sought to harmonize previously arising disputes among scholars (a principle called hwajaeng 和諍).

As it now stands, Korean Buddhism consists mostly of the Seon Lineage, primarily represented by the Jogye and Taego Orders. The Korean Seon has a strong relationship with other Mahayana traditions that bear the imprint of Chan teachings as well as the closely related Zen. Other sects, such as the modern revival of the Cheontae lineage, the Jingak Order (a modern esoteric sect), and the newly formed Won, have also attracted sizable followings.

Korean Buddhism has contributed much to East Asian Buddhism, especially to early Chinese, Vietnamese, Japanese, and Tibetan schools of Buddhist thought.

== Historical overview and development ==
=== Arrival and spread of Buddhism ===
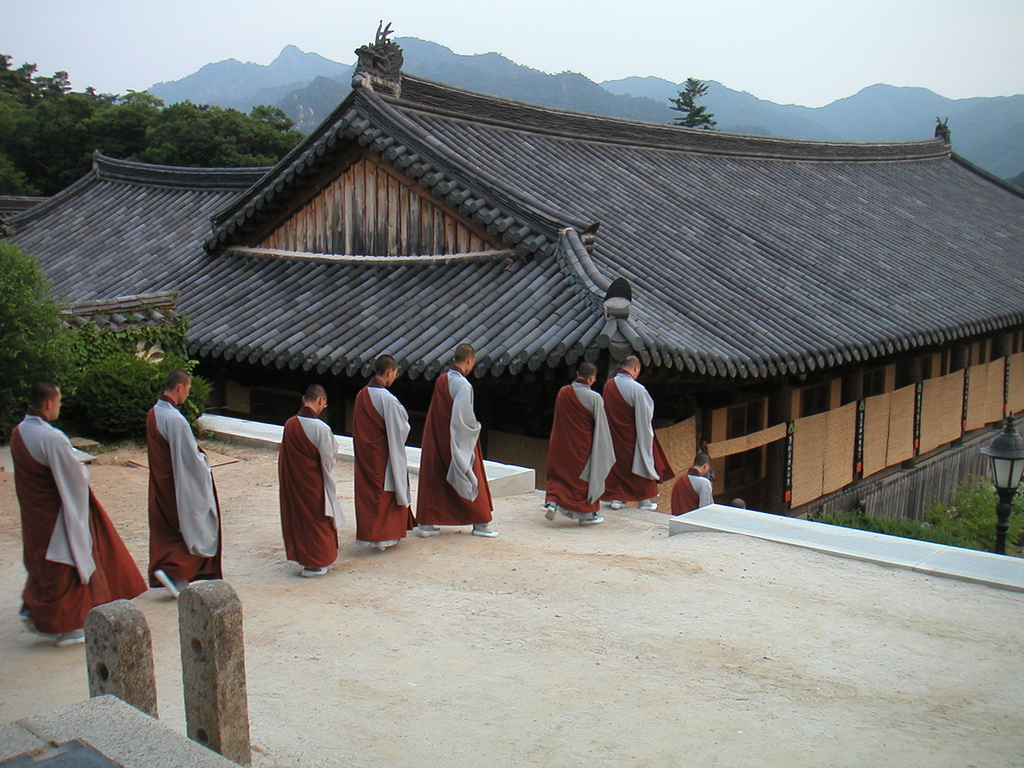
Monks going down to their rooms after evening prayers at Haeinsa

When Buddhism was originally introduced to Korea from Former Qin in 372, about 800 years after the death of the historical Buddha, shamanism was the indigenous religion. The Samguk yusa and Samguk sagi record the following three monks who were among the first to bring Buddhist teaching, or Dharma, to Korea in the 4th century during the Three Kingdoms period: Malananta – an Indian Buddhist monk who came from Serindian area of southern China's Eastern Jin Dynasty and brought Buddhism to the King Chimnyu of Baekje in the southern Korean peninsula in 384 CE, Sundo (Chinese: 順道; Pinyin: Shundao) – a monk from northern Chinese state Former Qin brought Buddhism to Goguryeo in northern Korea in 372 CE, and Ado – a monk who brought Buddhism to Silla in central Korea. As Buddhism was not seen to conflict with the rites of nature worship, it was allowed by adherents of Shamanism to be blended into their religion. Thus, the mountains that were believed by shamanists to be the residence of spirits in pre-Buddhist times later became the sites of Buddhist temples.

Though it initially enjoyed wide acceptance, even being supported as the state ideology during the Goryeo (918–1392 CE) period, Buddhism in Korea suffered extreme repression during the Joseon (1392–1897 CE) era, which lasted over five hundred years. During this period, Neo-Confucianism overcame the prior dominance of Buddhism.

Only after Buddhist monks helped repel the Japanese invasions of Korea (1592–98) did the persecution of Buddhists stop. Buddhism in Korea remained subdued until the end of the Joseon period, when its position was strengthened somewhat by the colonial period, which lasted from 1910 to 1945. However, these Buddhist monks did not only put an end to Japanese rule in 1945, but they also asserted their specific and separate religious identity by reforming their traditions and practices. They laid the foundation for many Buddhist societies, and the younger generation of monks came up with the ideology of Minjung Pulgyo, or "Buddhism for the people". The importance of this ideology is that it was coined by the monks who focused on common men's daily issues. After World War II, the Seon school of Korean Buddhism once again gained acceptance.

=== Extent and syncretic impact of Buddhism ===
A 2005 government survey indicated that about a quarter of South Koreans identified as Buddhist. However, the actual number of Buddhists in South Korea is ambiguous as there is no exact or exclusive criterion by which Buddhists can be identified, unlike the Christian population. With Buddhism's incorporation into traditional Korean culture, it is now considered a philosophy and cultural background rather than a formal religion. As a result, many people outside of the practicing population are deeply influenced by these traditions. Thus, when counting secular believers or those influenced by the faith while not following other religions, the number of Buddhists in South Korea is considered to be much larger. Similarly, in officially atheist North Korea, while Buddhists officially account for 4.5% of the population, a much larger number (over 70%) of the population are influenced by Buddhist philosophies and customs.

== Buddhism in the Three Kingdoms ==
When Buddhism was introduced to Korea in the 4th century CE, the Korean peninsula was politically subdivided into Three Kingdoms of Korea: Goguryeo in the north (which included territory currently in Russia and China), Baekje in the southwest, and Silla in the southeast. There is concrete evidence of an earlier introduction of Buddhism than traditionally believed. A mid-4th century tomb, unearthed near Pyongyang, is found to incorporate Buddhist motifs in its ceiling decoration.

Korean Buddhist monks traveled to China or India in order to study Buddhism in the late Three Kingdoms Period, especially in the 6th century. In 526, the monk Gyeomik (謙益) from Baekje traveled via the southern sea route to India to learn Sanskrit and study the Vinaya. The monk Paya (波若; 562–613?) from Goguryeo is said to have studied under the Tiantai master Zhiyi. Other Korean monks of the period brought back numerous scriptures from abroad and conducted missionary activity throughout Korea.

Several schools of thought developed in Korea during these early times:

- the Samlon (三論宗) or East Asian Mādhyamaka school focused on Mādhyamaka doctrine
- the Gyeyul (戒律宗, or Vinaya in Sanskrit) school was mainly concerned with the study and implementation of śīla or "moral discipline"
- the Yeolban (涅槃宗, or Nirvāna in Sanskrit) school based in the themes of the Mahāyāna Mahāparinirvāṇa Sūtra
- the Wonyung (圓融宗, or Yuanrong in Chinese) school formed toward the end of the Three Kingdoms Period. This school lead to the actualization of the metaphysics of interpenetration as found in the Avatamsaka Sutra and was considered the premier school, especially among the educated aristocracy.
- the Hwaeom (華嚴宗 or Huayan school) was the longest lasting of the "imported" schools. It had strong ties with the Beopseong (法性宗), an indigenous Korean school of thought.

The date of the first mission from Korea to Japan is unclear, but it is reported that a second detachment of scholars was sent to Japan upon invitation by the Japanese rulers in 577. The strong Korean influence on the development of Buddhism in Japan continued through the Unified Silla period. It was not until the 8th century that independent study by Japanese monks began in significant numbers.

=== Goguryeo ===
In 372, the monk Sundo (順道, pinyin: Shùndào) was sent by Fu Jian (337–385) (苻堅) of Former Qin to the court of the King Sosurim of Goguryeo. He brought texts and statues (possibly of Maitreya, who was popular in Buddhism in Central Asia), and the Goguryeo royalty and their subjects quickly accepted his teachings. Buddhism in China was in a rudimentary form, consisting of the law of cause and effect and the search for happiness. This had much in common with the predominant Shamanism, which likely led to the quick assimilation of Buddhism by the people of Goguryeo.

Early Buddhism in Silla developed under the influence of Goguryeo. Some monks from Goguryeo came to Silla and preached among the people, making a few converts. In 551, Hyeryang (惠亮), a Goguryeo monk was appointed the first National Patriarch of Silla. He first presided over the "Hundred-Seat Dharma Assembly" and the "Dharma of Eight Prohibitions".

=== Baekje ===
In 384, the Indian monk Marananta arrived in Baekje and the royal family received the strain of Buddhism that he brought. King Asin of Baekje proclaimed, "people should believe in Buddhism and seek happiness." In 526, the Baekje monk Gyeomik (겸익, 謙益) traveled directly to Central India and came back with a collection of Vinaya texts, accompanied by the Indian monk Paedalta (Sanskrit: Vedatta). After returning to Baekje, Gyeomik translated the Buddhist scriptures in Sanskrit into seventy-two volumes. The Gyeyul school in Baekje was established by Gyeomik about a century earlier than its counterpart in China. As a result of his work, he is regarded as the father of Vinaya studies in Korea.

=== Silla ===
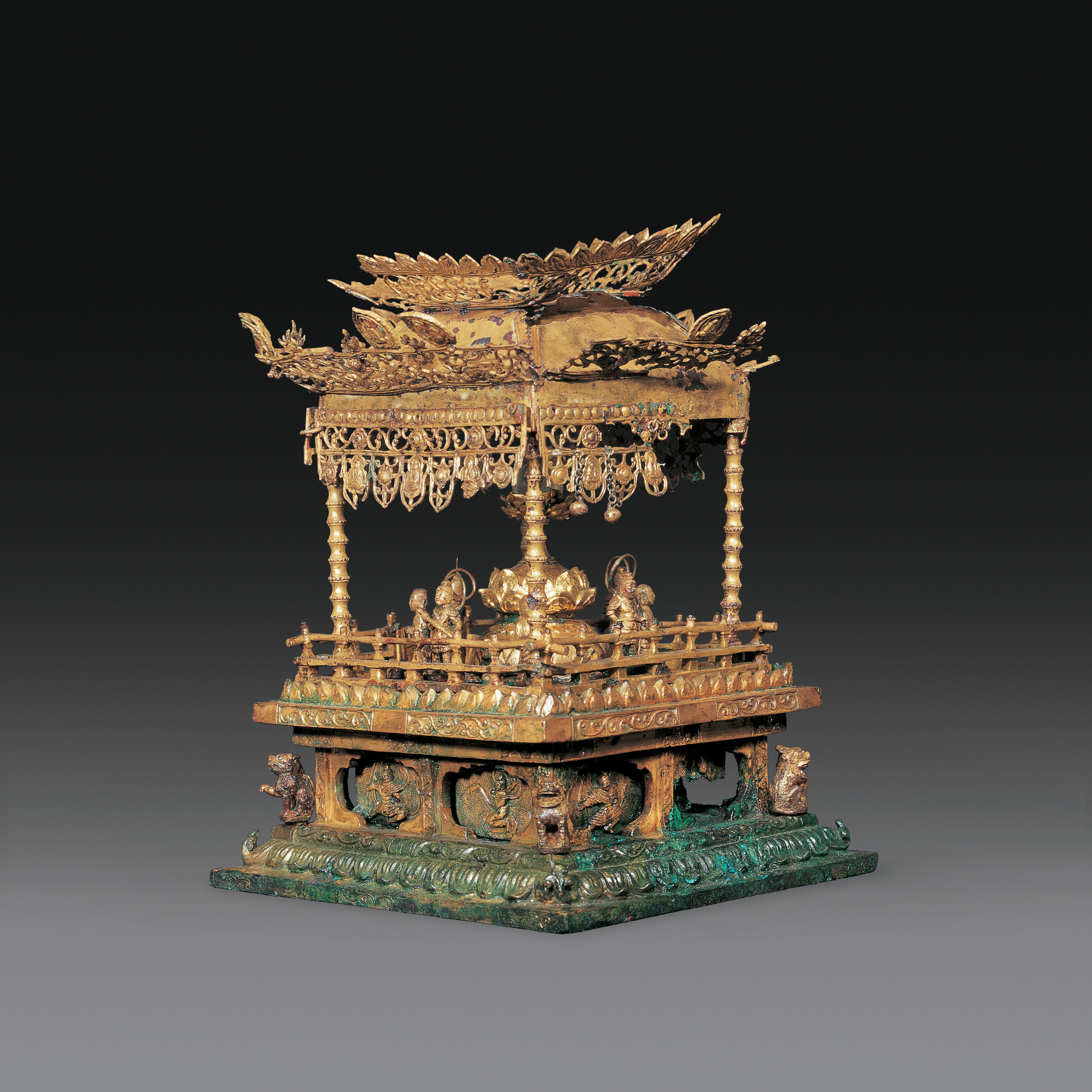
Reliquary from Kamŭnsa temple site, now in the National Museum of Korea.

Buddhism did not enter the kingdom of Silla until the 5th century. The common people were first attracted to Buddhism here, but there was resistance among the aristocrats. In 527, however, a prominent court official named Ichadon presented himself to King Beopheung of Silla and announced he had become Buddhist. The king had him beheaded, but when the executioner cut off his head, it is said that milk poured out instead of blood. Paintings of this are in the temple at Haeinsa and a stone monument honoring his martyrdom is in the Gyeongju National Museum.

During the reign of the next king, Jinheung of Silla, the growth of Buddhism was encouraged and eventually recognized as the national religion of Silla. Selected young men were physically and spiritually trained at Hwarangdo according to Buddhist principles regarding one's ability to defend the kingdom. King Jinheung later became a monk himself.

The monk Jajang (慈藏) is credited with having been a major force in the adoption of Buddhism as a national religion. Jajang is also known for his participation in the founding of the Korean monastic sangha.

Another great scholar to emerge from the Silla Period was Wonhyo. He renounced his religious life to better serve the people and even married a princess for a short time, with whom he had a son. He wrote many treatises and his philosophy centered on the unity and interrelatedness of all things. He set off to China to study Buddhism with a close friend, Uisang, but only made it part of the way there. According to legend, Wonhyo awoke one night very thirsty. He found a container with cool water, which he drank before returning to sleep. The next morning he saw that the container from which he had drunk was a human skull and he realized that enlightenment depended on the mind. He saw no reason to continue to China, so he returned home. Uisang continued to China and after studying for ten years, offered a poem to his master in the shape of a seal that geometrically represents infinity. The poem contained the essence of the Avatamsaka Sutra.

Buddhism was so successful during this period that many kings converted and several cities were renamed after famous places during the time of the Buddha.

== Buddhism in the North–South States Period (668–935) ==
In the eighth century, Korean Buddhism and its gods were associated with prosperity.

=== Unified Silla (668–935) ===
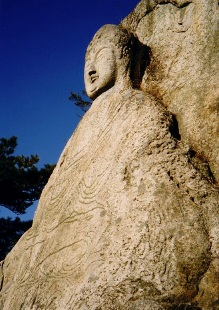
A stone image of a Buddha, near Gyeongju, South Korea. 7th century Silla.

In 668, the kingdom of Silla succeeded in unifying the whole Korean peninsula, giving rise to a period of political stability that lasted for about one hundred years under Unified Silla. This led to a high point in scholarly studies of Buddhism in Korea. The most popular areas of study were Wonyung, Yusik (Ch. 唯識; Weishi) or East Asian Yogācāra, Jeongto or Pure Land Buddhism, and the indigenous Korean Beopseong ("Dharma-nature school").

Wonhyo taught the Pure Land practice of yeombul, which would become very popular amongst both scholars and laypeople, and has had a lasting influence on Buddhist thought in Korea. His work, which attempts a synthesis of the seemingly divergent strands of Indian and Chinese Buddhist doctrines, makes use of the Essence-Function (體用 che-yong) framework, which was popular in native East Asian philosophical schools. His work was instrumental in the development of the dominant school of Korean Buddhist thought, known variously as Beopseong, Haedong (海東, "Korean") and later as Jungdo (中道, "Middle Way")

Wonhyo's friend Uisang (義湘) went to Chang'an, where he studied under Huayan patriarchs Zhiyan (智儼; 600–668) and Fazang (法藏; 643–712). When he returned after twenty years, his work contributed to Hwaeom Buddhism and became the predominant doctrinal influence on Korean Buddhism together with Wonhyo's tongbulgyo thought. Hwaeom principles were deeply assimilated into the Korean meditation-based Seon school, where they made a profound effect on its basic attitudes.

Influences from Silla Buddhism in general, and from these two philosophers in particular crept backwards into Chinese Buddhism. Wonhyo's commentaries were very important in shaping the thought of the preeminent Chinese Buddhist philosopher Fazang, and Woncheuk's commentary on the Saṃdhinirmocana-sūtra had a strong influence in Tibetan Buddhism.

The intellectual developments of Silla Buddhism brought with them significant cultural achievements in many areas, including painting, literature, sculpture, and architecture. During this period, many large and beautiful temples were built. Two crowning achievements were the temple Bulguksa and the cave-retreat of Seokguram (石窟庵). Bulguksa was famous for its jeweled pagodas, while Seokguram was known for the beauty of its stone sculpture.

=== Balhae (698–926) ===
Buddhism also flourished in the northern Korean Kingdom of Balhae, established after the fall of Goguryeo, as the state religion. The remains of ten Buddhist temples have been found in the remains of the capital of Balhae, Sanggyeong, together with such Buddhist artifacts as Buddha statuettes and stone lanterns, which suggests that Buddhism played a predominant role in the life of the Balhae people. The Balhae tomb Majeokdal in Sinpo, South Hamgyong Province, are associated with pagodas and temples: This also indicates that Buddhism had a strong influence over the funerary rituals in Balhae.

After the fall of Balhae, sixty monks from Balhae including the monk Jaeung (載雄) fled together to the newly founded kingdom of Goryeo (918–1392).

=== Seon ===
A new epoch in Korean Buddhism began during the latter Silla with the birth of schools of Korean Seon. In China, the movement toward a meditation-based practice, which came to be known as Chan Buddhism, had begun during the sixth and seventh centuries, and it was not long before the influence of the new meditational school reached Korea, where it was known as Seon. The term is more widely known in the West in its Japanese variant, Zen. Tension developed between the new meditational schools and the pre-existing academically oriented schools, which were described by the term gyo, meaning "learning" or "study".

Kim Gyo-gak (金喬覺; 630–729), a prince who became a monastic, came to the region of Anhui to Mount Jiuhua in China. Many Chinese Buddhists believe he was indeed the transformation body of Kṣitigarbha. Two uncles sent by his mother and wife to call him back also became monastics there. His well-preserved, dehydrated body is seen at the monastery he built on Mount Jiuhua today. The two uncles, being officials before becoming monastics, found it difficult to abstain from wine and meat, and so practiced in another place on the mount. People built the palace of the two saints (二聖殿) in their practice place to memorialize them. Many Buddhists visit there.

Beomnang (法朗; fl. 632–646), said to be a student of the Chinese master Daoxin (道信; 580–651), is generally credited with the initial transmission of Chan into Korea. It was popularized by Sinhaeng (神行; 704–779) in the latter part of the eighth century and by Doui (道義; died 825) at the beginning of the ninth century. From then on, many Koreans studied Chan in China, and upon their return established their own schools at various mountain monasteries with their leading disciples. Initially, the number of these schools was fixed at nine, and Korean Seon was then termed the "nine mountain schools" (九山 or gusan). Eight of these were of the Mazu Daoyi (馬祖道一; 709–788) lineage, as they were established through connection with either him or one of his eminent disciples. The one exception was the Sumi-san school founded by Ieom (利嚴; 869–936), which had developed from the Caodong school (曹洞).

== Buddhism as state religion in the Goryeo period (918–1392) ==
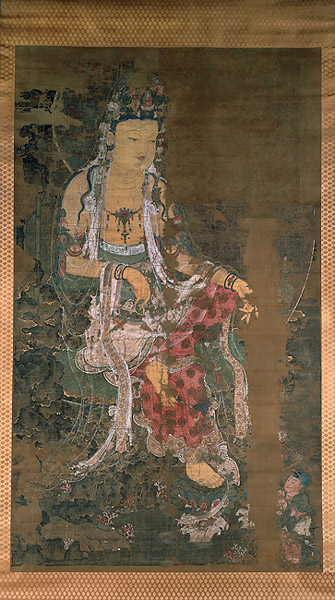
Korean painting of Water-Moon Avalokiteshvara, 1310 CE, ink on silk, painted by Umun Kim

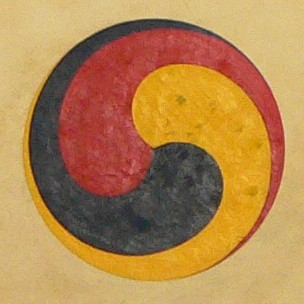
Taegeuk

=== Rise of the Seon ===
As Buddhism in medieval Korea evolved, it served to legitimize the state.

Initially, the new Seon schools were regarded by the established doctrinal schools as radical and dangerous upstarts. Thus, the early founders of the various "nine mountain" monasteries met with considerable resistance, repressed by the long influence in court of the Gyo schools. The struggles which ensued continued for most of the Goryeo period, but gradually the Seon argument for the possession of the true transmission of enlightenment gained the upper hand. The position that was generally adopted in the later Seon schools, due in large part to the efforts of Jinul (知訥; 1158–1210), did not claim clear superiority of Seon meditational methods, but rather declared the intrinsic unity and similarities of the Seon and Gyo viewpoints.

Although all these schools are mentioned in historical records, toward the end of the dynasty, Seon became dominant in its effect on the government and society, as well as the production of noteworthy scholars and adepts. During the Goryeo period, Seon thoroughly became a "religion of the state", receiving extensive support and privileges through connections with the ruling family and powerful members of the court.

=== Hwaeom (Huayan) and Seon ===
Although most of the scholastic schools waned in activity and influence during this period of Seon's growth, the Hwaeom school continued to be a lively source of scholarship well into the Goryeo, much of it continuing the legacy of Uisang and Wonhyo. In particular the work of Gyunyeo (均如; 923–973) prepared for the reconciliation of Hwaeom and Seon, with Hwaeom's accommodating attitude toward the latter. Gyunyeo's works are an important source for modern scholarship in identifying the distinctive nature of Korean Hwaeom.

Another important advocate of Seon/Gyo unity was Uicheon. Like most other early Goryeo monks, he began his studies in Buddhism with Hwaeom. He later traveled to China, and upon his return, actively promulgated the Cheontae (traditional Chinese: 天台宗; ; pinyin: Tiantai), which became recognized as another Seon school. This period thus came to be described as "five doctrinal and two meditational schools". Uicheon himself, however, alienated too many Seon adherents, and he died at a relatively young age without seeing a Seon-Gyo unity accomplished.

=== Jinul ===
The most important figure of Seon in the Goryeo was Jinul. In his time, the sangha was in a crisis of external appearance and internal issues of doctrine. Buddhism had gradually become involved with secular affairs, incorporating practices such as fortune-telling and offering of prayers and rituals for success in secular endeavors. Inclination toward these practices resulted in the profusion of an increasingly larger number of monks and nuns with questionable motivations. The correction, revival, and improvement of the quality of Buddhism became prominent issues for Buddhist leaders of the period.

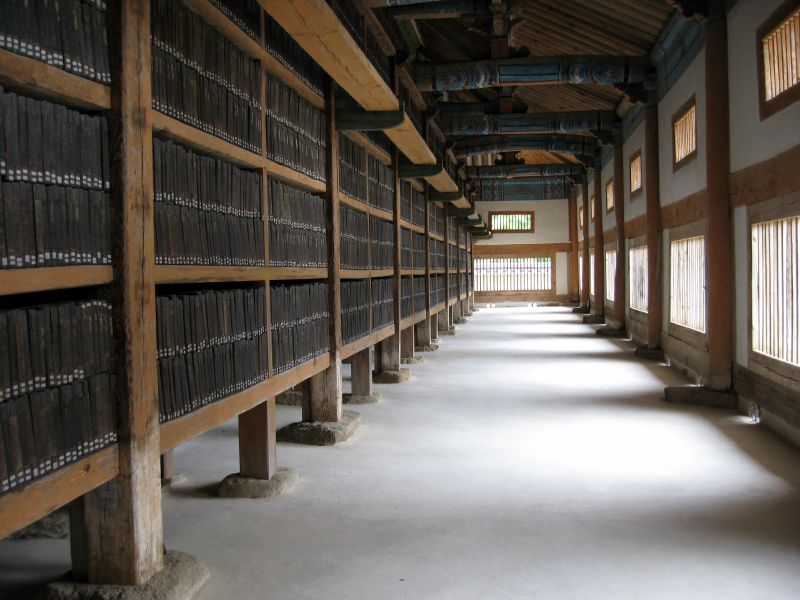
Tripitaka Koreana at Haeinsa

Jinul sought to establish a new movement within Seon which he called the "samādhi and prajñā society" (traditional Chinese: 定慧社; ; Korean: Jeonghyesa) whose goal was to establish a new community of disciplined, pure-minded practitioners deep in the mountains. He eventually accomplished this mission with the founding of Songgwangsa at Mt. Jogye (曹溪山). Jinul's works are characterized by a thorough analysis and reformulation of the methodologies of Seon study and practice.

One major issue that had long fermented in Chan, and which received special focus from Jinul, was the relationship between "gradual" and "sudden" methods in practice and enlightenment. Drawing upon various Chinese treatments of this topic, most importantly those by Huayan Patriarch Guifeng Zongmi (780–841) and Linji master Dahui Zonggao (大慧; 1089–1163), Jinul created a "sudden enlightenment followed by gradual practice" dictum that he outlined in a few relatively concise and accessible texts. From Dahui Zonggao, Jinul also incorporated the hwadu method into his practice. This form of meditation is the main method taught in Seon today.

Jinul's philosophical resolution of the Seon-Gyo conflict brought a deep and lasting effect on Korean Buddhism.

=== Late Goryeo ===
The general trend of Buddhism in the latter half of the Goryeo was a decline due to corruption, and the rise of strong anti-Buddhist political and philosophical sentiment. However, this period of relative decadence would nevertheless produce some of Korea's most renowned Seon masters. Three important monks of this period who figured prominently in charting the future course of Korean Seon were contemporaries and friends: Gyeonghan Baeg'un (景閑白雲; 1298–1374), Taego Bou (太古普愚; 1301–1382) and Naong Hyegeun (懶翁慧勤; 1320–1376). All three went to Yuan China to learn the hwadu practice of the Linji school (traditional Chinese: 臨濟; ; Korean: Imje) that had been popularized by Jinul. All three returned and established the sharp, confrontational methods of the Imje school in their own teaching. Each of the three was also said to have had hundreds of disciples, such that this new infusion into Korean Seon brought about a considerable effect.

Despite the Imje influence, which was generally considered to be anti-scholarly in nature, Gyeonghan and Naong, under the influence of Jinul and the traditional tongbulgyo tendency, showed an unusual interest in scriptural study, as well as a strong understanding of Confucianism and Taoism, due to the increasing influence of Chinese philosophy as the foundation of official education. From this time, a marked tendency for Korean Buddhist monks to be "three teachings" exponents appeared.

A significant historical event of the Goryeo period is the production of the first woodblock edition of the Tripiṭaka called the Tripitaka Koreana. Two editions were made, the first one completed from 1210 to 1231, and the second one from 1214 to 1259. The first edition was destroyed in a fire, during an attack by the Mongols in 1232, but the second edition is still in existence at Haeinsa in Gyeongsang. This edition of the Tripitaka was of high quality, and served as the standard version of the Tripitaka in East Asia for almost 700 years.

== Suppression under the Joseon Dynasty (1392–1910) ==
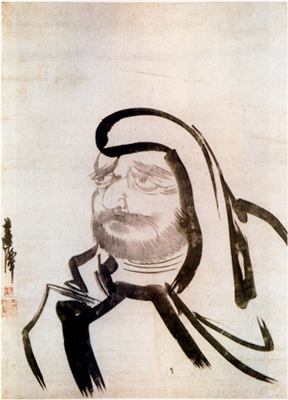
Dalmado by Gim Myeong-guk, 17th century

In 1388, an influential general named Yi Seonggye (1335–1408) carried out a coup d'état and established himself as the first ruler of the Joseon dynasty in 1392 with the support of this Neo-Confucian movement. He was posthumously renamed Emperor Taejo of Joseon in 1899. Joseon Buddhism, which had started off under the so-called "five doctrinal and two meditational" schools system of the Goryeo, was first condensed to two schools: Seon and Gyo. Eventually, these were further reduced to the single school of Seon.

Despite this strong suppression from the government, and vehement ideological opposition from Korean Neo-Confucianism, Seon Buddhism continued to thrive intellectually. An outstanding thinker was Gihwa (己和; (Hamheo Deuktong 涵虚得通) 1376–1433), who had first studied at a Confucian academy, but then changed his focus to Buddhism, where he was initiated to the gwanhwa tradition by Muhak Jacho (無學自超; 1327–1405). He wrote many scholarly commentaries, as well as essays and a large body of poetry. Being well-versed in Confucian and Taoist philosophies, Giwha also wrote an important treatise in defense of Buddhism, from the standpoint of the intrinsic unity of the three teachings, entitled the Hyeonjeong non. In the tradition of earlier philosophers, he applied che-yong ("essence-function") and Hwaeom (sa-sa mu-ae, "mutual interpenetration of phenomena").

Common in the works of Joseon scholar-monks are writings on Hwaeom-related texts, as well as the Awakening of Faith in the Mahayana, Sutra of Perfect Enlightenment, Śūraṅgama Sūtra, Diamond Sutra and the Heart Sutra. The Jogye order instituted a set curriculum of scriptural study, including the above-mentioned works, along with other shorter selections from eminent Korean monks, such as Jinul.

During the Joseon period, the number of Buddhist monasteries dropped from several hundred to a mere thirty-six. Limits were placed on the number of clergy, land area, and ages for entering the sangha. When the final restrictions were in place, monks and nuns were prohibited from entering the cities. Buddhist funerals, and even begging, were outlawed. However, some rulers occasionally appeared who looked favorably upon Buddhism and did away with some of the more suppressive regulations. The most noteworthy of these was the Queen Munjeong, who, as a devout Buddhist, took control of the government in the stead of her young son Myeongjong (r. 1545–67), and immediately repealed many anti-Buddhist measures. The queen had deep respect for the brilliant monk Bou (보우, 普雨; 1515–1565), and installed him as the head of the Seon school.

One of the most important reasons for the restoration of Buddhism to a position of minimal acceptance was the role of Buddhist monks in repelling the Japanese invasions of Korea, which occurred between 1592 and 1598. At that time, the government was weak from internal squabbles, and was not initially able to muster strong resistance to the incursion. The plight of the country encouraged some leaders of the sangha to organize monks into guerrilla units, which enjoyed some instrumental successes. The "righteous monk" (義士; uisa) movement spread during this eight-year war, finally including several thousand monks, led by the aging Seosan Hyujeong (서산대사, 西山休靜; 1520–1604), a first-rate Seon master and the author of a number of important religious texts. The presence of the monks' army was a critical factor in the eventual expulsion of the Japanese invaders.

Seosan is also known for continuing efforts toward the unification of Buddhist doctrinal study and practice. His efforts were strongly influenced by Wonhyo, Jinul, and Gihwa. He is considered the central figure in the revival of Joseon Buddhism, and most major streams of modern Korean Seon trace their lineages back to him through one of his four main disciples: Yu Jeong (1544–1610); Eongi (1581–1644), Taeneung (1562–1649) and Ilseon (1533–1608), all four of whom were lieutenants to Seosan during the war with Japan.

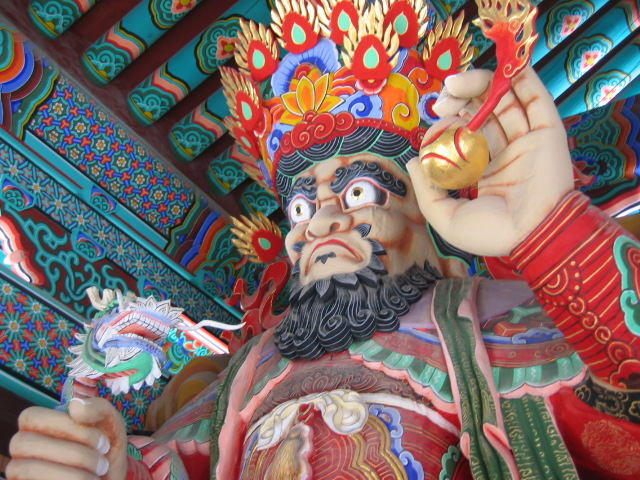
Statue of one of the Four Heavenly Kings

The biographies of Seosan and his four major disciples are similar in many respects, and these similarities are emblematic of the typical lifestyle of Seon monks of the late Goryeo and Joseon periods. Most of them began by engaging in Confucian and Daoist studies. Turning to Seon, they pursued a markedly itinerant lifestyle, wandering through the mountain monasteries. At this stage, they were initiated to the central component of Seon practice, the gong'an, or gwanhwa meditation. This gwanhwa meditation, unlike Zen traditions, did not consist of contemplation on a lengthy, graduated series of kōans. In contrast, the typical Korean approach was that "all gong'an are contained in one" and therefore it was, and still is, quite common for the practitioner to remain with one hwadu during his whole meditational career, most often Zhaozhou Congshen's "mu".

Buddhism during the three centuries, from the time of Seosan down to the next Japanese incursion into Korea in the late nineteenth century, remained fairly consistent with the above-described model. A number of eminent teachers appeared during the centuries after Seosan, but the Buddhism of the late Joseon, while keeping most of the common earlier characteristics, was especially marked by a revival of Hwaeom studies, and occasionally by new interpretations of methodology in Seon study. There was also a revival, during the final two centuries, of Pure Land Buddhism. Although the government maintained fairly tight control of the sangha, there was never again the extreme suppression of the early Joseon.

== Buddhism under Japanese colonial rule ==
During Japan's Meiji Restoration in the 1870s, the government abolished celibacy for Buddhist monks and nuns. Japanese Buddhists won the right to proselytize inside cities, ending a five-hundred year ban on clergy members entering cities. Jōdo Shinshū and Nichiren schools began sending missionaries to Korea and new sects formed in Korea such as Won Buddhism.

After Japan annexed Korea with the Japan–Korea Treaty of 1910, Korean Buddhism underwent many changes. The Temple Ordinance of 1911 (Korean: 사찰령; Hanja: 寺刹令) changed the traditional system whereby temples were run as a collective enterprise by the Sangha, replacing this system with Japanese-style management practices in which temple abbots appointed by the Governor-General of Korea were given private ownership of temple property and given the rights of inheritance to such property. More importantly, monks from pro-Japanese factions began to adopt Japanese practices, by marrying and having children.

In 1920, the Temple Ordinance was revised to reorganize temple administration and allow the Japanese government to directly oversee the 31 main temples in the country, with new headquarters at Kakwangsa (now Jogyesa). During the Second Sino-Japanese War, Korean Buddhism was placed under greater control. Japanese authorities had many temples' artworks shipped to Japan. Negotiations for the repatriation of these artworks are still ongoing today.

== Buddhism and independent Korea (1945–present) ==
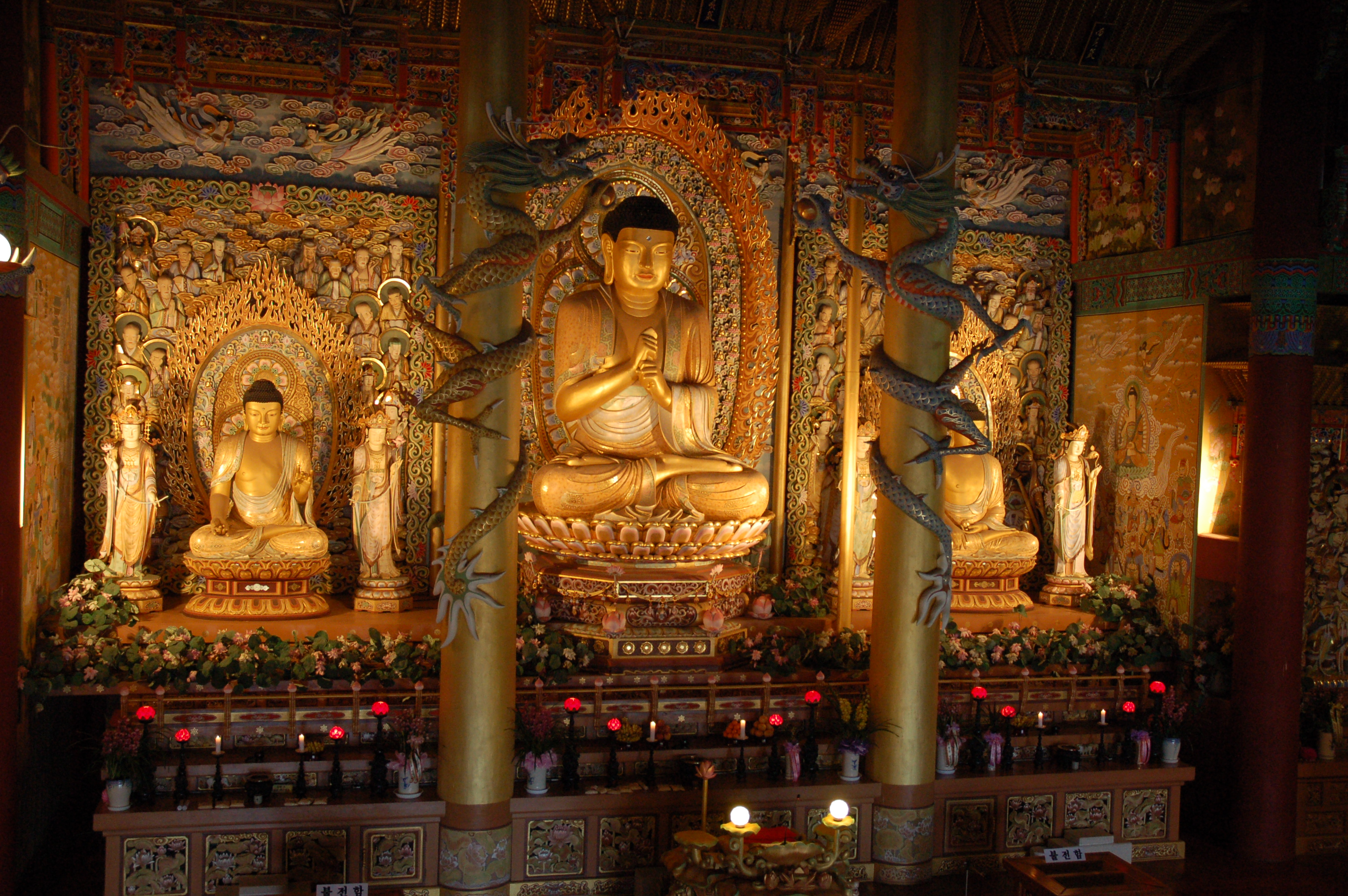
Typical interior of a Buddhist temple

When Korea was liberated by the surrender of Japan in 1945, the celibate monastics of what has become the largest sect of Korean Buddhism in terms of adherents and the number of clergy, the Jogye Order, began to take over for the married priests who ran the temples during the occupation. This order sees itself as the primary representative of traditional Korean Buddhism in existence. The Taego Order is the second largest order of Korean Buddhism and includes both celibate and married monks (nuns are expected to remain celibate). This is the only order that maintains the full Korean Buddhist ritual tradition.

=== Current situation ===
The Seon school, which is dominated by the Jogye Order in terms of the number of clergy and adherents, practices disciplined traditional Seon practice at a number of major mountain monasteries in Korea, often under the direction of highly regarded masters. The Taego Order, though it has more temples than the Jogye Order, is second in size in terms of the number of clergy and adherents and, in addition to Seon meditation, keeps traditional Buddhist arts alive, such as Yeongsanjae and other ritual dance.

Modern Seon practice is not far removed in its content from the original practice of Jinul, who introduced the integrated combination of the practice of Gwanhwa meditation and the study of selected Buddhist texts. The Korean monastic life is markedly itinerant for monks and nuns pursuing Seon meditation training: while each monk or nun has a "home" monastery, he or she will regularly travel throughout the mountains, staying as long as he or she wishes, studying and teaching in the style of the temple that is housing them. The Korean monastic training system has seen a steadily increasing influx of Western practitioner-aspirants in the second half of the twentieth century. The vast majority of Korean monks and nuns do not spend 20 or 30 years in the mountains pursuing Seon training in a form recognizable to westerners. Most Korean monks and nuns receive a traditional academic education in addition to ritual training, which is not necessarily in a formal ritual training program. Those who do spend time in meditation in the mountains may do so for a few years and then essentially return to the life of a parish priest.

Currently, Korean Buddhism is in a state of slow transition. While the reigning theory behind Korean Buddhism was based on Jinul's "sudden enlightenment, gradual cultivation", the modern Korean Seon master, Seongcheol's revival of Hui Neng's "sudden enlightenment, sudden cultivation" has taken Korean Buddhism by storm. Although there is resistance to change within the ranks of the Jogye order, with the last three Supreme Patriarchs' stance that is in accordance with Seongcheol, there has been a gradual change in the atmosphere of Korean Buddhism.

=== North Korea ===
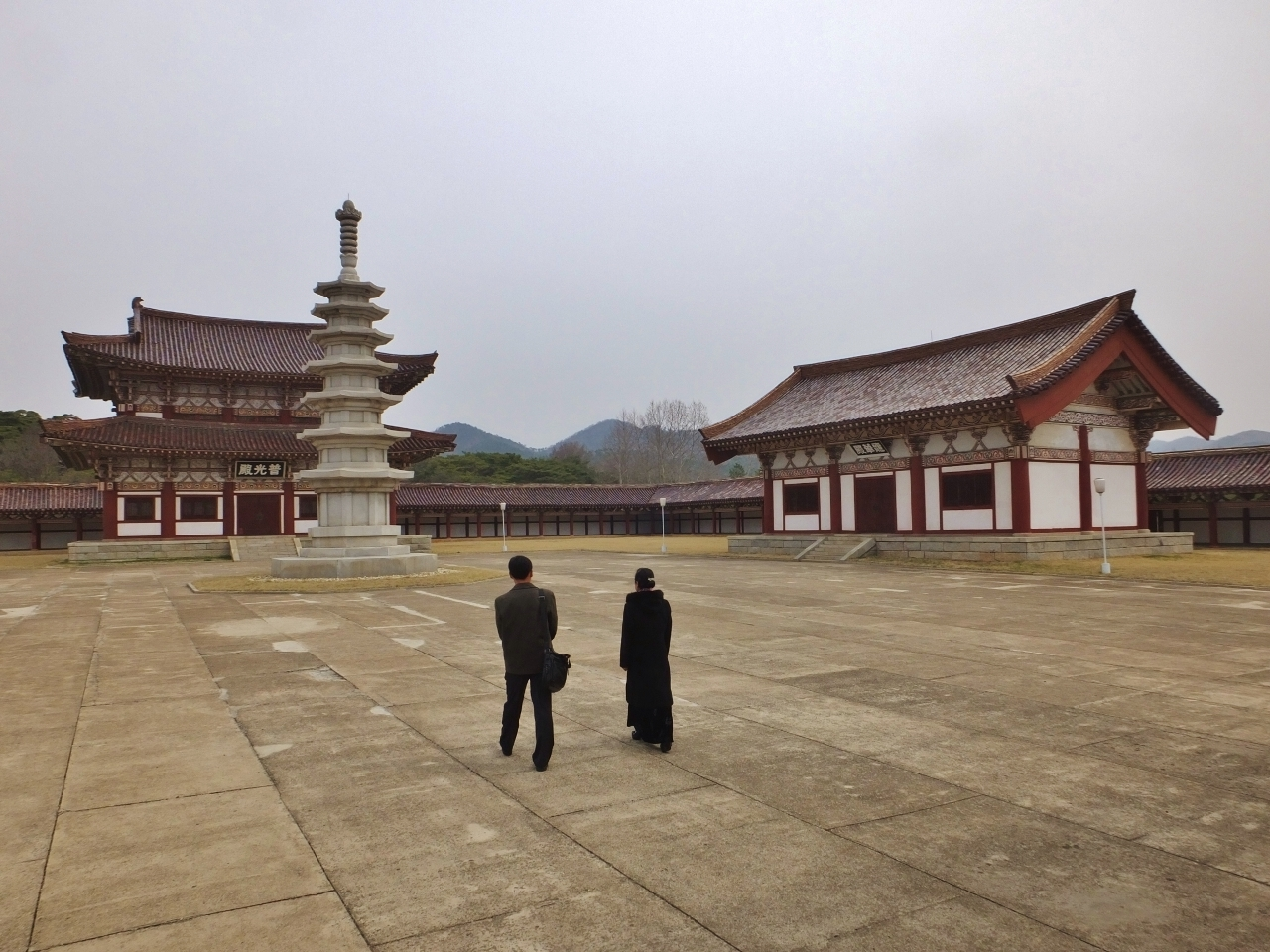
Buddhist temple of Chongrungsa, near Pyongyang

The regime in North Korea actively discourages the practice of religion, including Buddhism. Currently, the country claims to have about 10,000 active adherents of Buddhism. As with other religions in the country, Buddhism came under the close scrutiny of the country's government – including worship at Buddhist temples by monks, through the state-sponsored Korea Buddhist Federation. A major temple is Pohyonsa which was preserved by Kim Il-Sung.

Nevertheless, Buddhists in North Korea reportedly fared better than other religious groups – particularly Christians, who were said to often face persecution by the authorities, and Buddhists were given limited funding by the government to promote the religion, given that Buddhism played an integral role in traditional Korean culture.

=== South Korea ===
Starting in the 1950s, Syngman Rhee and others worked to further divide and weaken the Buddhist Sangha in the country. Rhee campaigned in 1954 against the so-called "Japanized Buddhists". Western education and scholarship, and the empowerment of women and the poor, caused divisions among Koreans. Specifically, a deep rift opened between married priests and celibate monks, a carryover from Japanese Buddhism's influence during the occupation period, though there had been calls for an end to celibacy from some Korean monks before Japan's annexation of the Korean peninsula. The differences were so great that fistfights over the control of temples became frequent. Monks, mostly belonging to the celibate Jogye order, threatened to kill themselves. Many of them were against the married clergy. As the Buddhist riots continued, the influence of Buddhism lessened. Buddhism continued to lose followers to Christian missionaries, who were able to capitalize on these weaknesses.

From the 1960s onward, Buddhism has grown considerably, through the formation of independent lay associations (that is, not funded or affiliated to the main orders), with many focused on youths, particularly to propagate and evangelize Buddhist teachings, fellowship and spiritual development, based on the Protestant model. These adaptations have modernized Buddhism in South Korea. Moreover, the South Korean government began devoting substantial funds to restore and reconstruct historic Buddhist temples, helping to revive Buddhism in the country. President Park Chung Hee unsuccessfully attempted during his rule (1961–1979) to settle the dispute by building a pan-national Buddhist organization. However, he did succeed in allying himself with the celibate faction, the Jogye Order.

It was in 1970 that Korean Buddhism split into a fully celibate order which retained the name "Jogye" and the Taego order that includes both celibate and married clergy. The Taego order retained the traditional red kasa whereas the Jogye order changed their kasa to brown to visually differentiate the two orders. Both orders continue to use the Dharmaguptaka Pratimoksha, the lineage of vows for monks and nuns taken in China and Vietnam, though Taego monks have the option of returning the vow of celibacy. When the Jogye order was founded, the government only recognized a small group of celibate Seon practitioners as "legitimate", thus all of the ritual specialists remained with the Taego order.

In the 1980s, President Chun Doo-hwan, a Presbyterian, adopted anti-Buddhist policies and attempted to restrict Buddhist activities. During his administration, many historic temples were converted into tourist resorts, which deprived temples of their autonomy, as these "national parks" were government-run. Consequently, Buddhists, especially the Jogye Order, were highly critical of these measures. From 27 to 31 October 1980, during the Kyeongsin Persecution, the government raided major Buddhist temples throughout the country, including the headquarters at Seoul's Jogyesa, under the guise of anti-government investigations and an attempt to "purify" Buddhism. 55 monks were arrested and many others were interrogated and tortured, including the abbot of Naksansa, who died from the abuses. None of the investigated monks were ever charged, although many were sent to reeducation camps. Throughout the 1980s, the Buddhist community was kept under strict surveillance of government agents and many were prosecuted under false charges of supporting Communists or conspiracy.

To Buddhists, the construct of a state-protecting Buddhism (호국불교 or 護國佛敎, Hoguk Bulgyo) had vanished, which served to radicalize a generation of Buddhists, including monks and laity and propelled them to start a movement called Minjung Buddhism (민중불교 or 民衆佛敎, "practical Buddhism" or "Buddhism for the masses"). This modernization emphasized ordinary people and was a reaction to aggressive Christian proselytization in Korea.

From the mid-1980s to date, Buddhism has expanded by through media and education. There are two major Buddhist media networks in South Korea, BTN Buddhist Television Network, Korea's only non-sectarian Buddhist Media, which includes cable television and IP Radio and the Buddhist Broadcasting System (BBS), founded in 1990. Buddhist orders are also affiliated with or operate 3 universities, 26 schools and 16 seminaries in the country. The Kwan Um School of Zen is one of South Korea's most successful international missionary institutions.

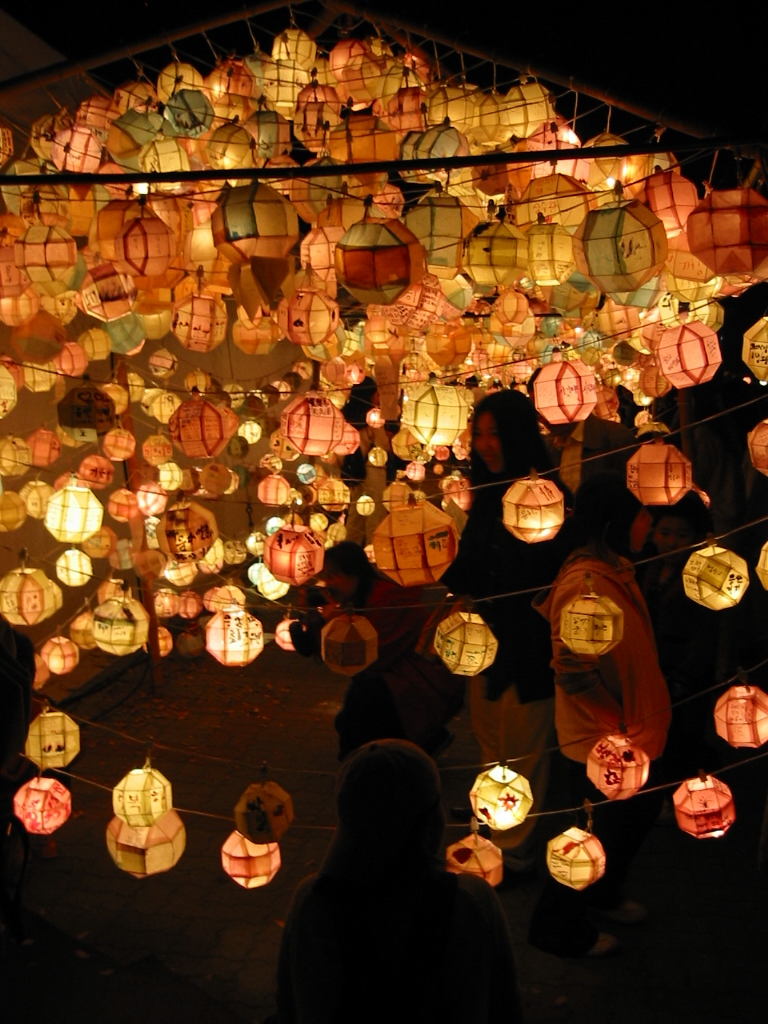
Lotus Lantern Festival

During the 1990s, conflicts between the South Korean government and Buddhist leaders, as well as with fundamentalist Protestant denominations, continued. The government accused Buddhism of immorality and many Protestants used this to forward their missionary work. Some religious gatherings have even turned violent, vandalizing statues of Buddha and Dangun, the mythical founder of Korea. Soon after the Buddhist Broadcasting Service's FM radio station was launched in 1990, young men vandalized and destroyed sound facilities worth US$200,000.

There was also a rash of temple burnings in the 1980s and 1990s, and attacks on Buddhist artwork have continued. In one instance, a Protestant minister used a microphone on a cord as a bolo weapon and smashed temple paintings and a statue. In other instances, red crosses have been painted on temple walls, murals, and statues. Buddha statues have also been decapitated. Furthermore, students at Buddhist universities report aggressive attempts to convert them on campus, especially near campus temples.

Sectarian tensions between fundamentalist Protestants and Buddhists occasionally surface due to what has been seen as a tendency of government officials – many of whom are Christians, especially of Protestant denominations – to tilt the political balance in favour of Christians over Buddhists which has led to discontent within the Buddhist community.

Of particular note was the ascension of Lee Myung-bak to the South Korean presidency when the high proportion of Christians in relation to Buddhists in the public sector became known – particularly the president's cabinet, where there were 12 Christians to only one Buddhist. among other reported incidences.

Recently, the South Korean public has become increasingly critical of Protestant churches and leaders due to their support for aggressive missionary tactics. This has led many Protestants leaving their churches and converting to Buddhism.

The growing discontent with Protestant Christianity in South Korea has contributed to a spiritual and cultural revival of Buddhism in South Korea, with the number of followers increasing in recent years.

==== Antagonism from Korean Protestant fundamentalism ====
Fundamentalist Protestant antagonism against Buddhism has increased in recent years. Acts of vandalism against Buddhist amenities and instances of fundamentalist Christians praying for the destruction of all Buddhist temples and monasteries have all drawn attention to this persistent hostility against Buddhism from Korean Protestants. South Korean Buddhists have denounced what they view as discriminatory measures against them and their religion by the administration of President Lee Myung-bak, which they attribute to Lee being a Protestant. The Buddhist Jogye Order has accused the Lee government of discriminating against Buddhism by ignoring Buddhist temples in certain public documents. In 2006, according to the Asia Times, "Lee also sent a video prayer message to a Christian rally held in the southern city of Busan in which the worship leader prayed feverishly: 'Lord, let the Buddhist temples in this country crumble down!'" Further, according to an article in Buddhist-Christian Studies: "Over the course of the last decade a fairly large number of Buddhist temples in South Korea have been destroyed or damaged by fire by misguided Protestant fundamentalists. More recently, Buddhist statues have been identified as idols, attacked and decapitated. Arrests are hard to effect, as the arsonists and vandals work by stealth of night." A 2008 incident in which police investigated protesters who had been given sanctuary in the Jogye temple in Seoul and searched a car driven by Jigwan, then the executive chief of the Jogye order, led to protests by some claiming police had treated Jigwan as a criminal.

In October 2010, students from Church Equipping Worship School posted a clip on YouTube professing a hope that God would destroy a Buddhist temple in Seoul. Later they claimed being taught such by God.

"This place (Bongeunsa Temple) will be demolished and God will win it back....Useless idols (Buddha's statue) here made me really sad," the student said in the clip.

Following public outrages sparked by the video, pastor Choi Ji-ho and students from the school went to Bongeunsa Temple to apologize for the comments made by the student.

The presidency of Park Geun-hye intended to address Protestant Christian antagonism against Buddhists in South Korea, due to increasing calls for religious cooperation in the country by the general public. During the first year of the Park administration, a national message was delivered for the celebration of Buddha's Birthday, a contrast from the former Lee Myung-bak administration which was criticised for its role in the suppression of Buddhist influence in South Korea.

== See also ==
- Awakening of Faith in the Mahayana
- Cheondojae
- Cheontae
- Chunseong
- Chogye International Zen Center
- Daewon
- Doseon
- Essence-Function
- Gihwa
- Gyeongheo
- Haedong Goseungjeon, Lives of Eminent Korean
- Hanam Jungwon
- Han Yong-un
- Hwaeom
- Hyecho
- Hyobong Hangnul
- Hyujeong
- Ichadon
- Jingak Order
- Jinul
- Jogye Order
- Kim Hwasang
- Korean Buddhist sculpture
- Korean Buddhist temples
- Korean pagoda
- Korean Seon
- Kwan Um School of Zen
- Kyunyeo
- List of Korean Buddhists
- Mangong
- Muhak
- Nine mountain schools
- Religion in Korea
- Seongcheol
- Seungnang
- Seungsahn
- Sutra of Perfect Enlightenment
- Taego Bou
- Taego Order
- Tripitaka Koreana
- Uicheon
- Uisang
- Vajrasamadhi-sutra
- Woncheuk
- Wonhyo
- Yeongsanjae
- Yongseong
- Yujeong
- Beophwagye, new Buddhist religious movement in South Korea
