= Muhak =

Korean Buddhist monk (1327–1405)

Muhak (Korean: 무학, 1327–1405) was a Korean Buddhist monk that lived during the transition between the Goryeo and the Joseon kingdoms.

== Biography ==
Muhak was a Buddhist monk and an advisor to Yi Seong-gye who then became King Taejo, the founder of the Jason dynasty. Muha was his Buddhist name (meaning "the uneducated"), while his real name was Jacho (자초).

It is thought that Muhak's reputation as a geomancer influenced Yi's decision to move the capital from Gaeseong to Hanyang (present-day Seoul). According to a historical account dating from 14th century, Yi Seong-gye asked Muhak to find a site for the new capital. After searching for a suitable place, the monk stopped and saw an old farmer passing by on his ox. The farmer pointed toward the northwest and said to him, wangsimni (往十里), literally meaning 'go ten more ri.' The startled Muhak went to the northwest as he was told and ended up at the southern foot of Mt. Bugak, where Gyeongbokgung now stands. Wangsimni Station on the Seoul Subway is named according to this record.

== Shrine ==
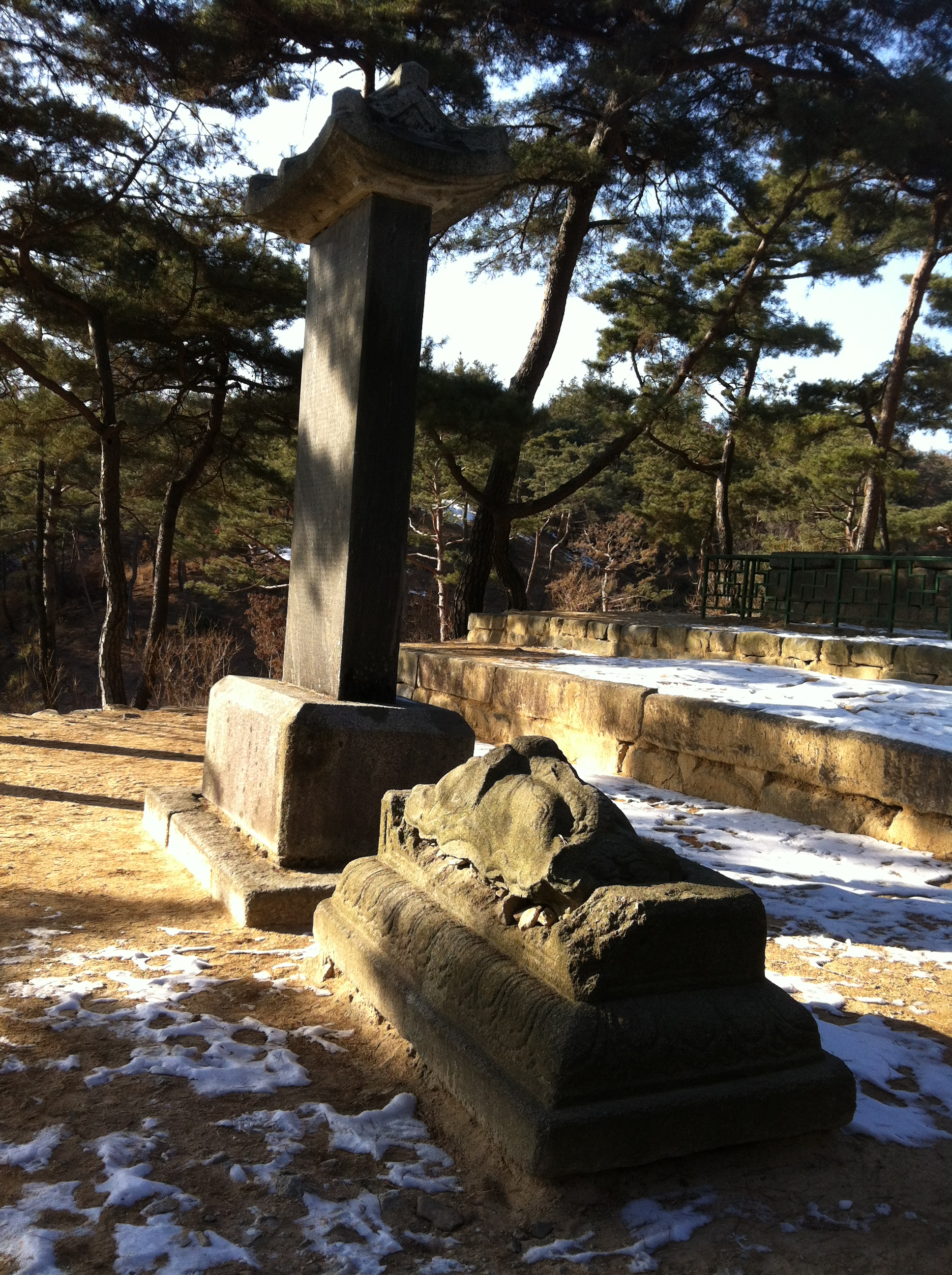
Stale of Muhak Daesa

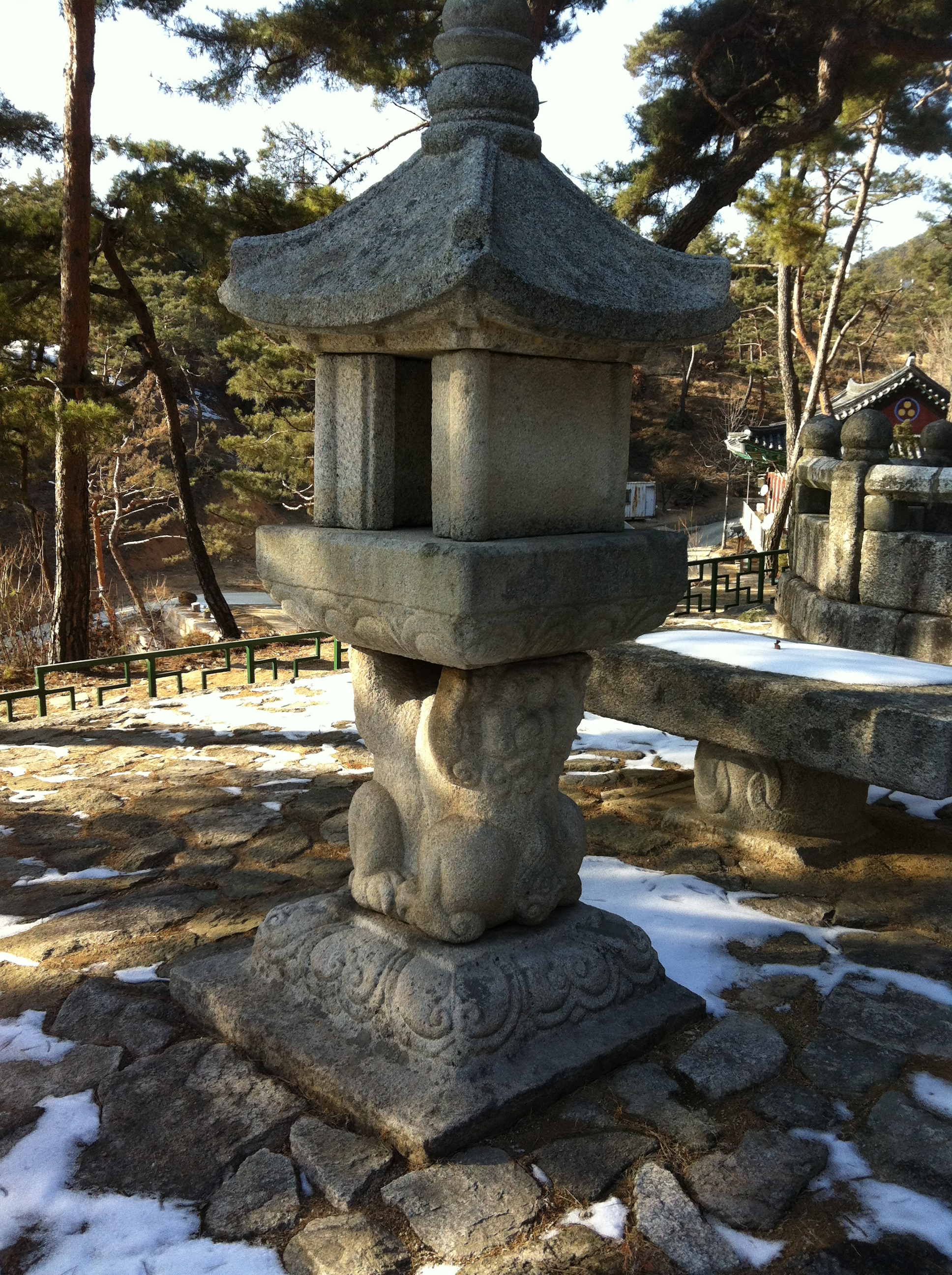
Stone light for Muhak Daesa

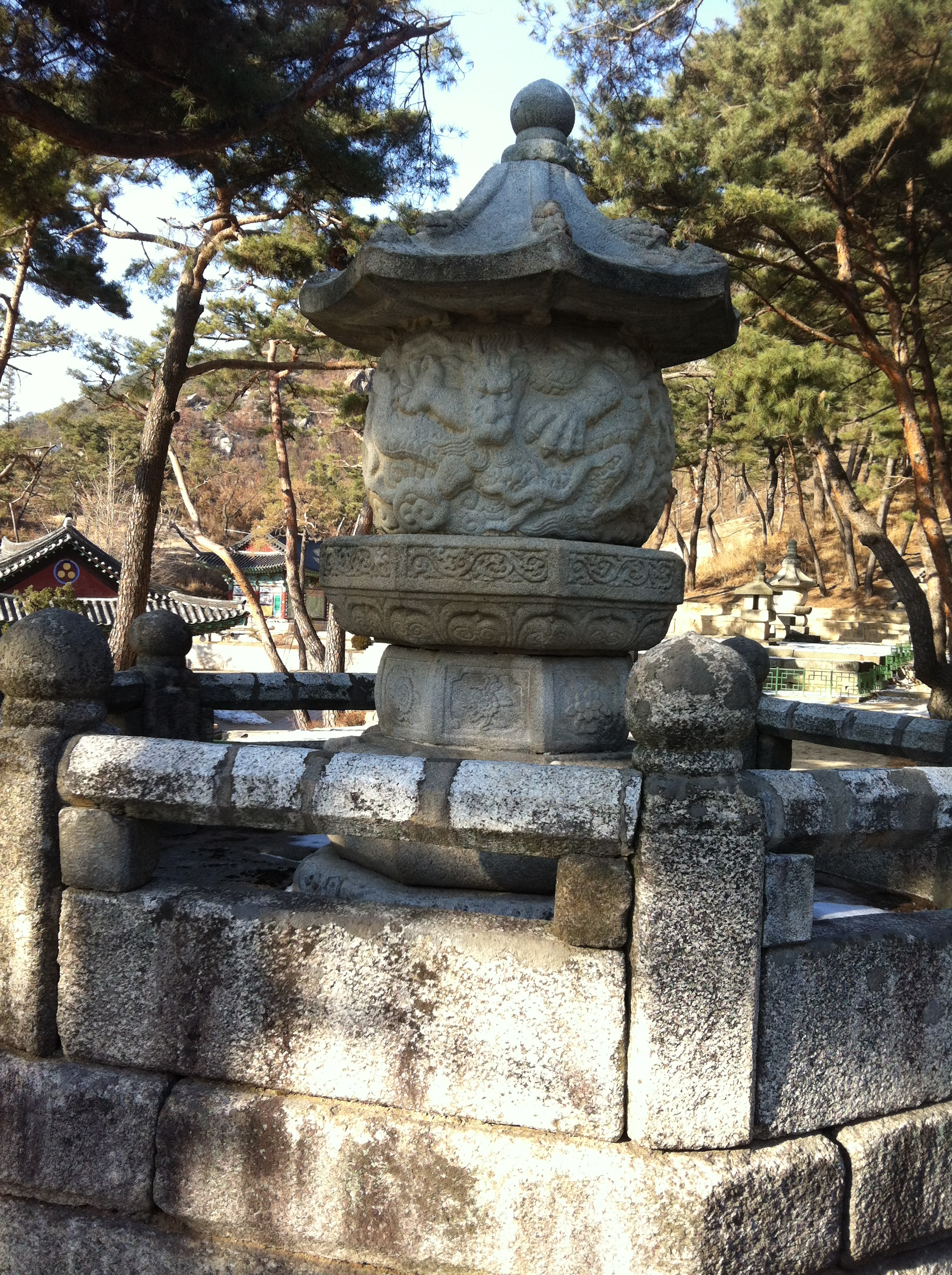
Stupa for Muhak Daesa at Hoeamsa treasure 388 of SK

Muhak Daesa in various Korean locations

One portrait of Muhak is enshrined in Josadong. This pavillon, located inside Silleuksa, is used to pay tribute to the three Buddhist priests Jigong (d. 1363), Naong Hyegeun (c. 1320–1376) and Muhak (c. 1327–1405). This shrine is now the oldest remaining building of the founded circa 580 temple.

== Disciples ==
- Gihwa (기화) 1376–1433

== Television portrayals ==
- Portrayed by Ahn Gil-kang in the 2012 SBS TV series The Great Seer.
- Portrayed by Park Byung-ho in the 2014 KBS1 TV series Jeong Do-jeon.
