= Kihwa =

Korean Buddhist monk (1376–1431)

- Title: Seon master

Personal life
- Born: 1376 Korea
- Died: 1433 (aged 56–57)

Religious life
- Religion: Buddhism
- School: Korean Seon

Senior posting
- Teacher: Muhak

Kihwa (Korean: 기화; Hanja: 己和, 1376–1433), also known as Hamhŏ Tŭkt'ong, was a Buddhist monk of Korean Seon and leading Buddhist figure during the late Goryeo to early Joseon eras. He was originally a Confucian scholar of high reputation, but converted to Buddhism at the age of 21 upon the death of a close friend. He wandered among the Korean mountain monasteries, until he had the fortune of becoming the disciple of the last Korean national teacher, Muhak.

Kihwa's writings showed a distinctive mixture between iconoclastic and subitist Seon language, and a strong appreciation for the scriptural tradition. Thus, he took up from Jinul the tradition of unification of Seon and Gyo Buddhism. Among his writings, there are four works in particular that made a deep impact on the subsequent Seon tradition in Korea. These are:

1. A commentary on the Sutra of Perfect Enlightenment, the Weongak gyeong hae seorui.
2. A redaction and subcommentary to five famous earlier commentaries on the Diamond Sutra, the Geumgang banyabaramilgyeong ogahae seorui.
3. A subcommentary and redaction of the Collection of Yongjia, the Yonggajip gwaju seorui
4. The Hyeonjeong non

As a result of his fourth major work, the Hyeonjeong non, Kihwa distinguished himself as the primary Buddhist respondent to the rising Neo-Confucian polemic of his period, as he responded with vigor to the Neo-Confucian criticisms of Buddhism.

Kihwa died while residing at Jeongsusa, at the southern tip of Ganghwado, where his tomb can still be visited. Kihwa's commentary on the Sutra of Perfect Enlightenment was translated by A. Charles Muller, in 1999.

Essence-Function is a key concept in East Asian Buddhism and particularly that of Korean Buddhism. Essence-Function takes a particular form in the philosophy and writings of Kihwa.

== Biography ==
At the age of 21, he entered Uisangam in Gwanaksan and became a Buddhist monk. The following year, he learned a Buddhist service from Jacho of Hoeamsa. After that, he returned from a trip to famous mountains across the country and devoted himself to ascetic practice.

== See also ==
- Korean philosophy
