= Hyujeong =

Korean monk (1520–1604)

Hyujeong 휴정 休靜
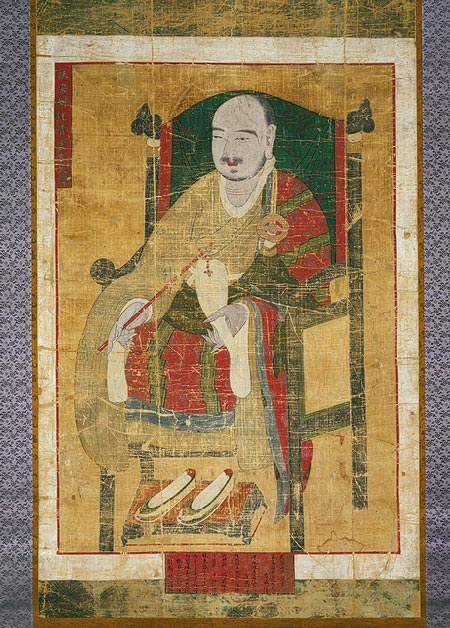
- Title: Dae Seonsa (Great Seon Master)

Personal life
- Born: 1520 Joseon
- Died: January 23, 1604 (aged 83–84)
- Other name: Seosan Daesa

Religious life
- Religion: Buddhism
- School: Korean Seon

Senior posting
- Students: Yujeong, Pyeongyang Eongi (平壤彦機)

Hyujeong (Korean: 휴정; Hanja: 休靜, 1520–1604), also called Seosan Daesa (서산대사; 西山大師) was a Korean Seon master. As was common for monks in this time, he became an itinerant monk, living in a succession of monasteries. Buddhist monks had been forced to keep a low profile since General Yi Seonggye had been forced to eject Buddhism from its state of total permeation of government in order to gain the support of Neo-Confucian scholar-officials to consolidate his position against his Buddhist political opponents when he overthrew Gongyang of Goryeo in 1392 to become King Taejo of Joseon.

Before ever having tested his hand as a military commander, Hyujeong was a first-rate Seon master and the author of a number of important religious texts, the most important of which is probably his Seongagwigam (Korean: 선가귀감; Hanja: 禪家龜鑑), a guide to Seon practice studied by Korean monks even today. Like most monks of the Joseon period, Hyujeong had been initially educated in Neo-Confucian philosophy. Dissatisfied, though, he wandered through the mountain monasteries. Later, after making a name for himself as a teacher, he was made arbiter of the Seon school by Myeongjong of Joseon, who was sympathetic towards Buddhism. He soon resigned from this responsibility, though, returning to the itinerant life, advancing his Seon studies and teaching at monasteries all around Korea.

At the beginning of the 1590s, Toyotomi Hideyoshi, after stabilising Sengoku-era Japan under his rule, made preparations for a large-scale invasion of Joseon. Joseon was unaware and was unprepared for the Japanese invasion. In 1592, after Japan's request for aid conquering Ming China was rebuffed, approximately 200,000 Japanese soldiers invaded Joseon, and the Japanese invasions of Korea (1592–98) began.

At the beginning of the first invasion, Seonjo of Joseon fled the capital, leaving a weak, poorly trained army to defend the country. In desperation he called on Hyujeong to organise monks into guerilla units. Even at 73 years of age he managed to recruit and deploy some 5,000 of these warrior monks, who enjoyed some instrumental successes.

At first, the government armies of Joseon suffered repeated defeats, and the Japanese armies marched north up to Pyongyang and Hamgyong Province. At sea, however, the Joseon navy, under the command of Admiral Yi Sun-sin, enjoyed successive victories. Throughout the country, loyal volunteer armies formed and fought against the Japanese together with the warrior monks and the government armies of Joseon.

The presence of Hyujeong's monk army, operating out of the Heungguksa deep in the mountain of Yeongchwisan, was a critical factor in the eventual expulsion of the Japanese invaders in 1593 and again in 1598.

The Taekwon-Do pattern So-San is named in his honor.

== See also ==
- Yujeong
