= Seungnang =

Korean Buddhist monk

- Hangul: 승랑
- Hanja: 僧朗
- Revised Romanization: Seungnang
- McCune–Reischauer: Sŭngnang

Seungnang was a Korean Buddhist monk. He was born in Goguryeo and spent most of his life in the Sui dynasty for preaching. He majored in Samnon and is famous for making Samnon flourish in both Sui and Goguryeo.

"He was active around the end of the fifth and early sixth centuries CE and was a native of Yodong in Goguryeo (present-day Liaotung). He was a master of the Three Treatise School (Korean: Samnon) (Madhyamaka School of Nagarjuna)".
