= Hyobong Hangnul =

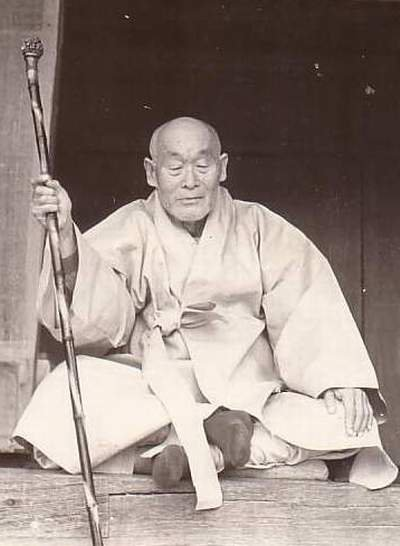
- Title: Seon master

Personal life
- Born: 1888 Korea (near Pyongyang)
- Died: 1966 (aged 77–78)
- Education: Waseda University

Religious life
- Religion: Buddhism
- School: Jogye

Senior posting
- Successor: Kusan Sunim

Hyobong Hangnul (1888—1966) was a Korean Jogye Seon master who was the former head of the Jogye Order. The master of the late Kusan Sunim, Hyobong was the guiding teacher of several temples in Korea—including Songgwang-sa and Haein-sa. Stephen Batchelor has called him, "One of the most remarkable Buddhist teachers of this century in Korea." Hyobong was also the first Korean individual to serve as a judge for the Japanese Imperial government, though he resigned his position after being troubled with having sentenced a man to death. Having told no one of his resignation, he took to selling toffee in rural towns and eventually came to ordain as a sunim under Sŏktu Sunim. Hyobong went on to live as a traveling monk, visiting monastery after monastery for many years. He died in the posture of zazen while at P'Yoch'chung monastery in 1966.

== See also ==
- Buddhism in Korea
- Korean Seon
- Jogye Order
