= Yeongchwisan =

Mountain in South Jeolla, South Korea

Coordinates: 35°56′N 128°20′E

Highest point
- Elevation: 510 m (1,670 ft)

Geography
- Location: South Jeolla Province, South Korea

Yeongchwisan is a mountain of South Jeolla Province, southwestern South Korea. It has an elevation of 510 metres.

At the beginning of April, the mountain is covered with azalea flowers.

== See also ==
- List of mountains of Korea
