= Yujeong =

Korean buddhist monk (1544–1610)

Samyeong Daesa 사명대사 / 泗溟大師
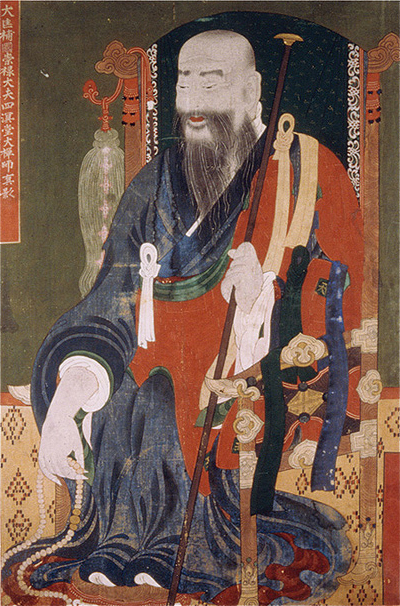
- Title: bhikṣu

Personal life
- Born: 1544 Joseon
- Died: 1610 (aged 65–66)

Religious life
- Religion: Buddhism
- School: Korean Seon

Korean name
- Hangul: 임응규
- Hanja: 任應奎
- RR: Im Eunggyu
- MR: Im Ŭnggyu

Art name
- Hangul: 사명, 송운, 종봉
- Hanja: 四溟, 松雲, 鍾峯
- RR: Samyeong, Songun, Jongbong
- MR: Samyŏng, Songun, Chongbong

Courtesy name
- Hangul: 이환
- Hanja: 離幻
- RR: Ihwan
- MR: Ihwan

Posthumous name
- Hangul: 자통홍제존자
- Hanja: 慈通弘濟尊者
- RR: Jatonghongjejonja
- MR: Chat'onghongjejonja

Dharma name
- Hangul: 유정
- Hanja: 惟政
- RR: Yujeong
- MR: Yujŏng

Samyeongdang (1544–1610), also known by his dharma name Yujeong, was a Korean Buddhist monk during the Joseon era. He is sometimes identified by his art name, Song-un. He was born to a family of the Im clan in Miryang, Gyeongsang Province. After the deaths of his mother in 1558 and his father in 1559, he became a monk at Jikjisa on Hwangaksan in Gimcheon.

== Life ==
In 1561, he passed the seon-gwa, the specialized gwageo (civil service examinations) for Buddhist monks. He corresponded with various scholars of the time including Pak Sa-am, Heo Hagok, and Im Baekho. In 1575, he was recommended as head of the Seon order, but refused and instead traveled to Myohyangsan. There he was instructed by preceptor Hyujeong. He went on to pass three years at Bodeoksa on Mount Kumgang, and later traveled through Palgongsan, Cheongnyangsan, and Taebaeksan.

With the start of the Japanese invasions of Korea (1592–98) in 1592, Yujeong joined his teacher Hyujeong's righteous army of monks. After Hyujeong retired due to his age, Yujeong took over the leadership of the army. He led the army into battles at Pyongyang and Uiryeong County in 1592, set up mountain fortresses through Gyeongsang in 1594, and joined in battle again at Ulsan and Suncheon.

In 1604, after the end of the war, he traveled to Japan on Seonjo of Joseon's orders to forge a peace accord with Tokugawa Ieyasu, and returned with 3500 Koreans who had been taken prisoner. Yujeong's diplomatic missions established a resilient foundation for a series of major Joseon missions to Japan.

After his death in 1610 on Haeinsa, Yujeong was enshrined in the Pyochung Seowon in Miryang and at Suchungsa in Nyongbyon. He continues to be remembered in modern times, with numerous statues and other memorials around Korea. He has been cited together with Hyujeong as an example of a "patriotic-minded" Buddhist by the North Korean Buddhist Federation. Yujeong's writings are preserved in the Samyeongjip (Korean: 사명대사집; Hanja: 四溟大師集) and Bunchungseo Nallok (Korean: 분충서난록; Hanja: 奮忠紓難錄).

== See also ==
- List of Joseon Dynasty people
- Military history of Korea
