= Uisang =

Silla Korean Buddhist monk (625–702)

Uisang 의상 / 義湘
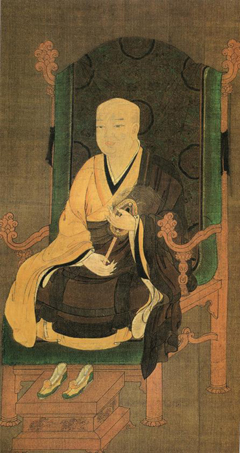
- Title: monk

Personal life
- Born: 625
- Died: 702

Religious life
- Religion: Buddhism
- School: Huayan

Korean name
- Hangul: 의상
- Hanja: 義湘
- RR: Uisang
- MR: Ŭisang

Uisang (Korean: 의상; Hanja: 義湘; 625–702) was one of the most eminent early Silla Korean scholar-monks, a close friend of Wonhyo (元曉).

He traveled to China, studying at Mount Zhongnan as a student of the influential Huayan master Zhiyan (智儼) and as a senior colleague of Fazang (法藏), with whom he established a lifelong correspondence. He became an expert in Huayan (華嚴) doctrine and was the founder of the Korean Hwaeom school. Most well known among his writings is the Beopseongge or Hwaeom ilseung beopgye do (Diagram of the Avataṃsaka Single Vehicle Dharmadhātu) (華嚴一乘法界圖). This is a commentary on his mandala-like diagram haein do ('Ocean Seal'), which consists of 210 Chinese characters that express the essence of the Huayan doctrine. A full translation can be found in the appendix to Odin, 1982.

Little is known of his early life other than his father was named Hin-sin and his family name was Kim.

He is famous for his travel to Táng China with his friend, Wonhyo. At one point they were captured by border guards and held for ten days as suspected spies but were subsequently released and expelled. Late, Wonhyo left Uisang, after unknowingly drinking water from a skull in the dark. The shock of this brought about an enlightenment experience such that he felt it was unnecessary to continue to China in search of wisdom. Dismayed, but nonetheless determined, Uisang continued on his journey eventually reaching China by sea.

A Korean folk story relates how, when he was young, Uisang fell in love with a beautiful girl, Myo Hwa ("Delicate Flower") but she was chosen by the king of Silla to be sent as a gift to the Chinese Emperor thus thwarting their relationship. This turned Uisang to the religious life and he became a monk. Myo Hwa in desperation tried to commit suicide on the journey in China by throwing herself in the river. However, she was rescued and nursed back to health by a family who subsequently adopted her. Many years later she met Uisang on his travels to China but he explained that he was now a monk and could not go back with her to Silla as she wished. However, he said he would visit her when his studies in China were complete. This he did ten years later. Unfortunately, Myo Hwa was not at home so Uisang left her a note and hurried to get his ship back to Silla. Myo Hwa returned and realized she had just missed him and ran down to the sea to try to catch him before he left. The ship however had already left the shore and in desperation she leapt in the water. As she hit the water she was magically transformed into a dragon by the strength of her love and she was able to follow the ship back to Silla.

Safely arrived in Silla, Uisang went on to found Buseoksa, a temple in the Gyeongsangbuk-do (North Gyeongsang) mountains. The temple name means "Floating Rock" and is derived from an incident in which Myo Hwa, as a dragon, scares away some bandits by magically raising a boulder into the air. She is said to have transformed herself into a rock to continue protecting the site and her lover, Uisang. (Story related by Mu Soeng Sunim, 1987).

Uisang is often referred to as the "Temple Builder" because of the number of temples he established or extended during his lifetime.

== See also ==
- Buddhism in Korea
- History of Korea
- Temple mural of Uisang and Wonhyo can be found here
