= Hwangaksan =

Mountain in South Korea

Coordinates: 36°07′09″N 127°57′58″E

Highest point
- Elevation: 1,111 m (3,645 ft)

Geography
- Location: South Korea

Hwangaksan is a mountain of South Korea. It has an elevation of 1,111 metres.

== See also ==
- List of mountains of Korea
