= Janggyeong Panjeon of Haeinsa =

15th-century wooden depository complex in South Korea

- Interactive map of Janggyeong Panjeon of Haeinsa
- 35°48′06″N 128°05′55″E
- Location: Hapcheon County, South Gyeongsang Province, South Korea

UNESCO World Heritage Site
- Type: Cultural
- Criteria: iv, vi
- Designated: 1995

National Treasure (South Korea)
- Official name: Janggyeongpanjeon Depositories of Haeinsa Temple, Hapcheon
- Designated: 1962

The Janggyeong Panjeon of Haeinsa (Korean: 합천 해인사 장경판전) (Note: Also called janggyeonggak) is a building complex that houses the printing woodblocks of the Tripitaka Koreana and other Buddhist scriptures. It is located at the Haeinsa temple on Gayasan mountain in Hapcheon County, South Gyeongsang Province, South Korea. Built in the 15th century, the complex was designated as a National Treasure of South Korea in 1962 and a UNESCO World Cultural Heritage in 1995. Its scientific design has contributed to the preservation of the woodblocks for more than 600 years.

== Background and history ==
Haeinsa is a Buddhist temple built in 802 (third year of the reign of Aejang of Silla), possibly as an expression of gratitude for Buddha’s power in curing the Aejang’s wife's illness.

From 1236 to 1251, the Tripitaka Koreana was produced to invoke Buddha's power to repel the Mongol invasions of Korea. It consists of 81,352 printing woodblocks. Although it was made in Namhae County and originally stored on Ganghwa Island, it was moved to its present-day location in 1398 due to frequent invasions of waegu.

Although the date of its first construction is unknown, the Janggyeong Panjeon is considered the oldest extant structure of Haeinsa. It went through a major renovation in 1457 (third year of the reign of Sejo of Joseon) and was rebuilt in 1488 under the supervision of monk Hakjo and with the support of the royal family. It escaped damage during the Imjin War because it is located in the mountains. It underwent two more renovations in 1622 and 1624.

In 1951 during the Korean War, Colonel Kim Yeong-hwan defied orders and stopped the bombing of Haeinsa. In recognition of his actions, Haeinsa enshrined his spirit tablet inside the building. It was later designated a National Treasure of South Korea in 1962 and a UNESCO World Cultural Heritage in 1995. The Tripitaka Koreana was designated a Memory of the World in 2007.

== Characteristics ==
The complex consists of two longer and two shorter buildings placed in a rectangular layout. The longer buildings, Sudarajangjeon, located in the south, and Beopbojeon, located in the north, are 15 kan wide and 2 kan deep and house the Tripitaka Korea woodblocks carved by workers of the central government. Dongsaganpanjeon and Seosaganpanjeon are 2 kan wide and 2 kan deep and house supplementary and miscellaneous woodblocks carved by workers of the temple or local government. These woodblocks were designated a Treasure of South Korea in 1982.

Because the buildings were built as repositories they do not have any decorative elements. They have a hip roof and round columns with pronounced entasis are set on various forms of flat foundation stones (평초석; 平礎石) and topped with column heads (주두; 柱頭).

=== Design for the preservation of woodblocks ===
The buildings' scientific design and arrangement of shelves enable effective ventilation, moisture control, and maintenance of appropriate indoor temperature. The windows on the facade are larger in the lower section and smaller in the upper section while the arrangement is reversed on the rear. This allows air to enter through the larger lower windows at the front, circulate in the building, and exit through the larger windows on the back, thereby promoting natural ventilation. Also, the clay floor which contains layers of charcoal, powdered lime, salt, and sand absorbs moisture during the humid summer and releases it during the dry winter. In addition, the building faces southwest to receive as much sunlight as possible. The shelves are open on all four sides, helping to reduce humidity. Also, they are set away from the walls to prevent direct exposure of the woodblocks to sunlight and are elevated approximately 30cm above the ground to protect them from moisture rising from the floor.

== In modern society ==
The Gak data centers of Naver Corporation, located in Chuncheon and Sejong City, are named after the complex, reflecting their mission to protect important records. They combine traditional design elements with modern eco-friendly techniques.

== Gallery ==
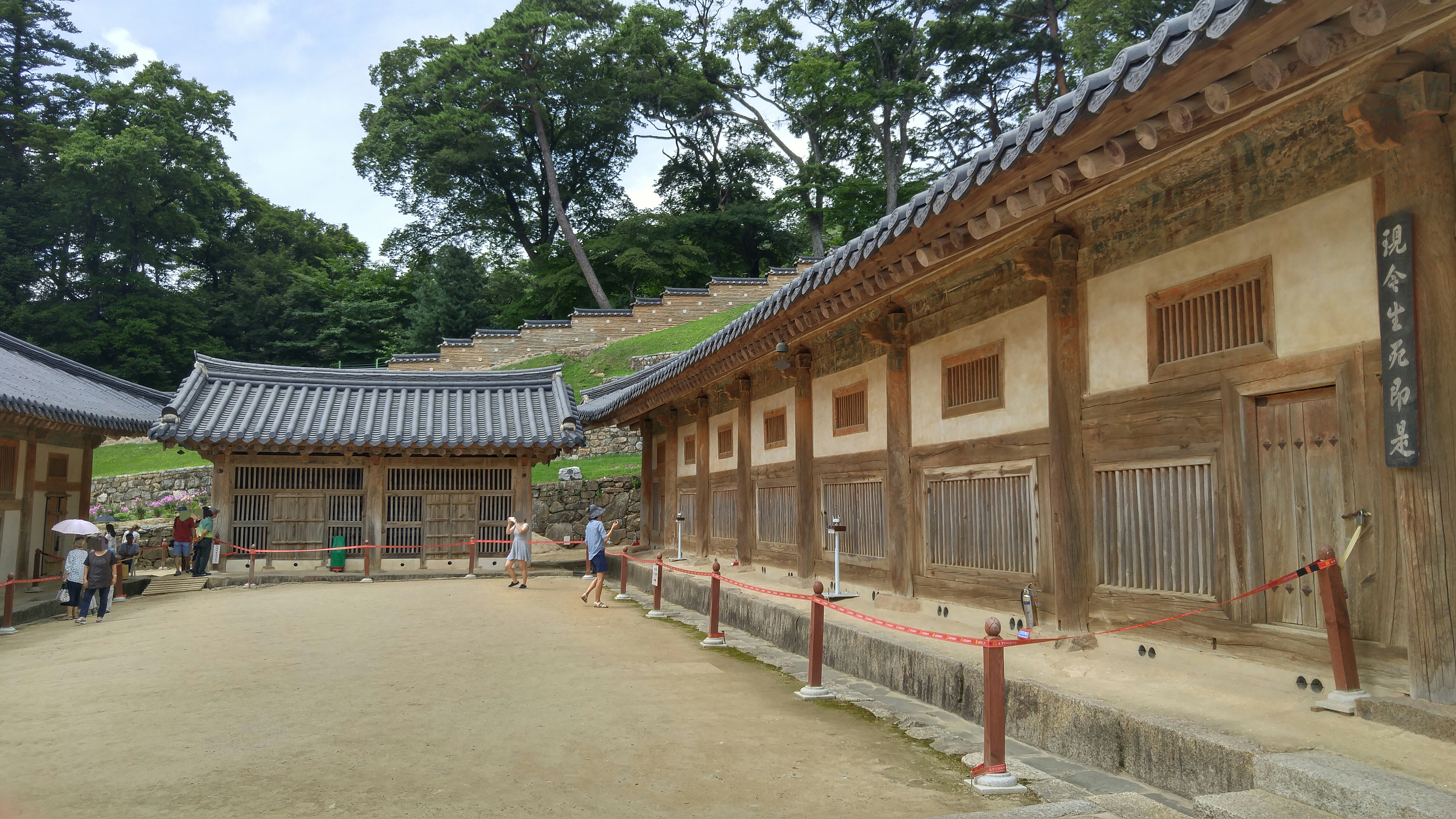
2017 appearance

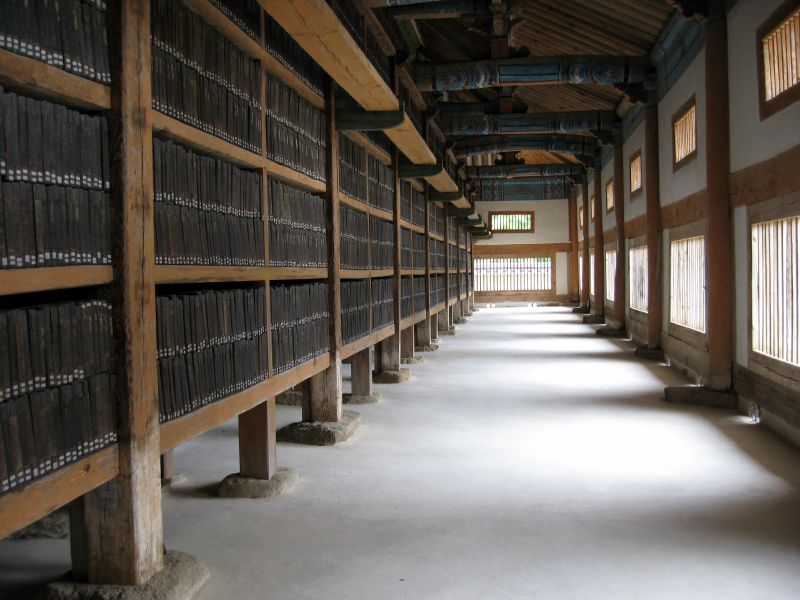
Inside Janggyeong Panjeon

== See also ==
- Woodblock printing in Korea

== External link ==
- Media related to Janggyeong Panjeon of Haeinsa at Wikimedia Commons
