= Allium plurifoliatum =

Scientific classification
- Kingdom: Plantae
- Clade: Tracheophytes
- Clade: Angiosperms
- Clade: Monocots
- Order: Asparagales
- Family: Amaryllidaceae
- Subfamily: Allioideae
- Genus: Allium
- Species: A. plurifoliatum

Binomial name
- Allium plurifoliatum Rendle

Species of plant

Allium plurifoliatum is a Chinese species of wild onion. It has been reported from Anhui, Gansu, Hubei, Shaanxi, and Sichuan at elevations of 1600–3300 m.

Allium plurifoliatum has a cluster of narrow bulbs each up to 10 mm across. Scape is up to 40 cm long. Leaves are flat, thin, about the same length as the scape. Umbel has only a few red or purple flowers.

Varieties

- Allium plurifoliatum var. plurifoliatum --- inner filaments broadened at base, each with a pair of teeth
- Allium plurifoliatum var. zhegushanense J. M. Xu --- filaments gradually tapering, without teeth (known only from Sichuan)

formerly included

Allium plurifoliatum var. stenodon (Nakai & Kitag.) J.M.Xu, now called Allium thunbergii var. thunbergii
