= Buddhist Sutra Pavilion =

General type of building in Buddhist temples for storing texts

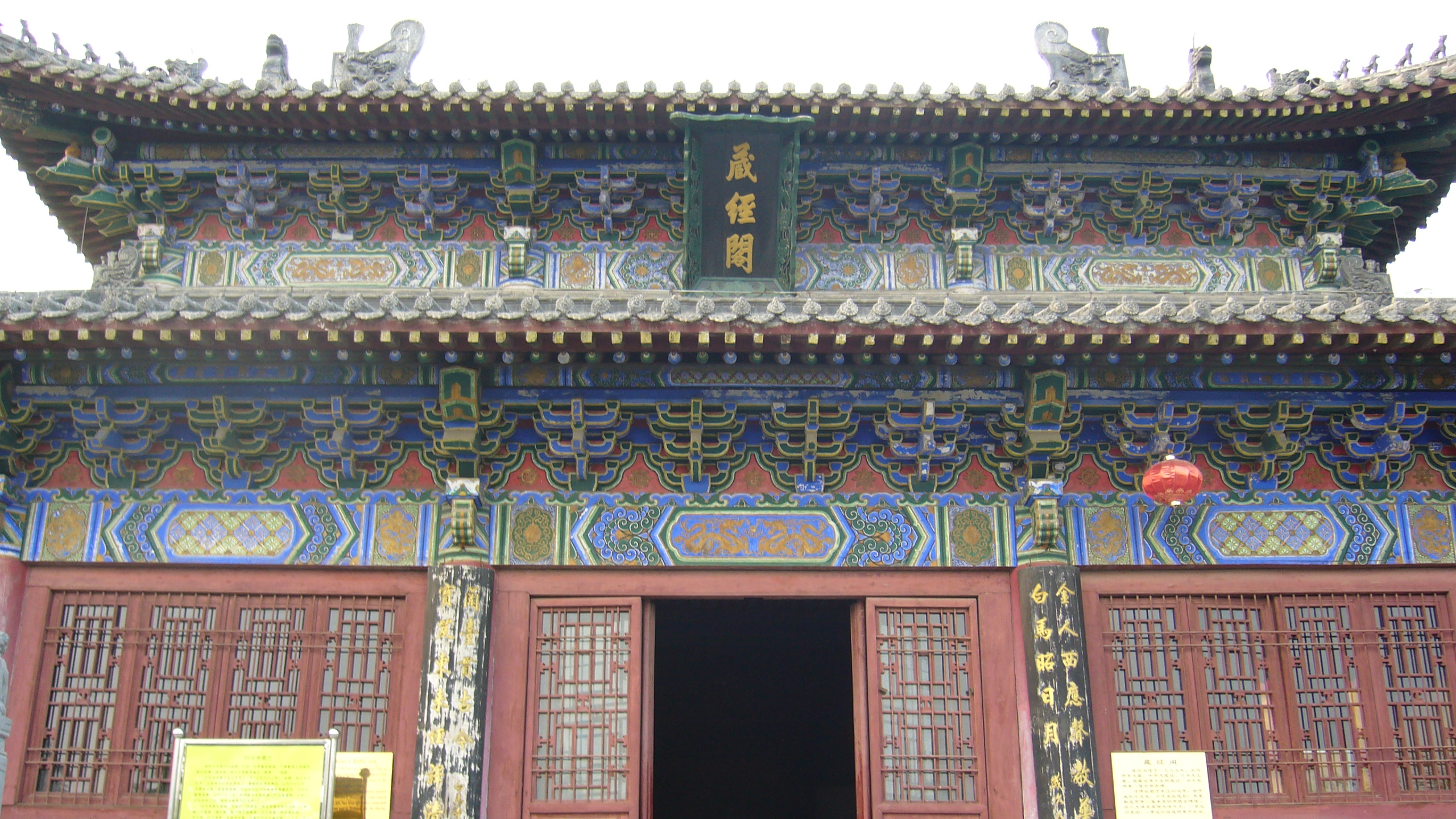
- The Buddhist Sutra Pavilion at White Horse Temple, in Luoyang, Henan, China.

Chinese name
- Traditional Chinese: 藏經閣
- Simplified Chinese: 藏经阁
- Literal meaning: Sutra Depository
Transcriptions
Standard Mandarin
- Hanyu Pinyin: Zàng/ Cáng Jīng Gé

Alternative Chinese name
- Traditional Chinese: 藏經樓
- Simplified Chinese: 藏经楼
- Literal meaning: Sutra Depository
Transcriptions
Standard Mandarin
- Hanyu Pinyin: Zàng/ Cáng Jīng Lóu

Vietnamese name
- Vietnamese alphabet: Tàng Kinh Các or Hòa Trai
- Chữ Hán: 蔵經閣 or 蔵經樓

Korean name
- Hangul: 장경판전
- Hanja: 蔵經板殿
Transcriptions
- Revised Romanization: Janggyeongpanjeon
- McCune–Reischauer: Changgyŏngp'anjŏn

Japanese name
- Kanji: 経蔵
Transcriptions
- Romanization: Kyōzō

Buddhist Sutra Pavilion is a dedicated hall within Buddhist temple complexes for storing sacred scriptures, particularly the Buddhist canons. It serves as both a library and a place for doctrinal study. These structures are vital for preserving Buddhist teachings and have developed distinct architectural and cultural features across different regions. In Chinese Buddhist temples, they are usually termed the Zangjing ge or Zangjing lou. In Japanese Buddhist temples, they are usually termed the Kyōzō. In Korean Buddhist temples, they are usually termed the Janggyeong Panjeon. In Vietnamese Buddhist temples, they are usually termed the Tàng Kinh Các. In Thai Buddhism, they are usually termed the Ho Trai.

== China ==
The Zangjing ge is a large building in Chinese Buddhist temples which is built specially for storing the Chinese Buddhist Canon (大藏經). The Chinese Buddhist Canon is the total body of Buddhist literature deemed canonical and was called "all the sutras" (一切經) in the ancient time. With four thousand kinds, it includes Āgama (經), Vinaya (律) and Abhidharma (論) texts. Āgama are theories made by Buddha for disciples to practice, Vinaya are the rules formulated by Buddha for believers and Abhidharma is the collection of theories explanations by Buddha's disciples.

A Buddhist texts library is generally two-storey buildings built at the highest point of the temple. The upper storey is for storing sutras and the lower layer is the "Thousand Buddha Pavilion" (千佛閣). One of the most prominent historical example of a Zangjing ge in China is the one located in Longxing Temple in Hebei, which was built in the 10th century during the early Song dynasty (960-1279). It is notable for containing the earliest known example of a zhuanlunzang (轉輪藏, lit: "Rotating Wheel Repository") in China, which is a special octagonal revolving bookshelf. To accommodate this zhuanlunzang, within the building's structure, the Song dynasty architects designed the Zangjing ge using certain unique structural techniques, including shifting the columns and using curved beams.

== Japan ==
In Japanese Buddhism, a prime example of a Kyōzō is Tōdai-ji in Nara, initially constructed during the Nara period (710–794) as an oil storehouse and repurposed in 1714 during the Edo period to store sutras. Designated a National Treasure, it features a hongawara roof with clay tiles and a yokoro (well-frame) structure made of interlocking timber for enhanced ventilation, moisture resistance, and pest control. This design, refined during the Kamakura (1185-1333) and Muromachi (1336-1573) periods, reflects classic Nara-era architecture. The depository safeguards invaluable Buddhist texts without housing specific Buddha images, emphasizing its preservation role.

== South Korea ==
In Korean Buddhism, Haeinsa in Gayasan National Park is renowned for its Janggyeong Panjeon, built in the 15th century to house the Tripitaka Koreana—81,258 wooden printing blocks from the 13th century. These depositories, recognized as a UNESCO World Heritage site, exhibit a scientific Joseon era (1392-1897) design with natural ventilation systems, adjustable windows, and moisture-regulating materials like charcoal and lime to protect the woodblocks. The structures are unadorned, prioritizing functionality.

== Vietnam ==
In Vietnamese Buddhism, the Bổ Đà Temple (Phổ Đà Sơn) in Bắc Giang Province exemplifies this, serving as a major center for the Trúc Lâm tradition of Thiền Buddhism since the Lý dynasty. The architectural style of Tàng Kinh Các adheres to traditional Vietnamese principles, creating a serene, enclosed space. The temple complex includes a large stupa garden and preserves over 2,000 Han-Nom woodblocks of Buddhist texts, which are among the oldest in Vietnam. While the depository focuses on scripture preservation, the temple's main hall venerates Quan Am and other deities. Another significant site is Xá Lợi Temple in Ho Chi Minh City, which stores Pali scriptures on palm leaves and a Buddha relic.

== Thailand ==
In Thai Buddhism, the Ho trai is designed to protect scriptures from the tropical climate's threats, such as humidity, insects, and rodents. Two main architectural styles exist: elevated pavilions over water (to prevent fire and pests) and land-based buildings with high foundations. The Ho trai at Wat Phra Kaew (Temple of the Emerald Buddha) in Bangkok, part of the Grand Palace, is a prime example. It features a square, multi-tiered roof with serrated eaves and ornate decorations, including guardian yaksha figures. This depository houses a gold-leaf Buddhist canon. While the depository itself may not enshrine Buddha images, Wat Phra Kaew's main ubosot enshrines the revered Emerald Buddha, and the temple complex serves as Thailand's most sacred Buddhist site.
