= Heondeok of Silla =

41st monarch of Silla (r. 809–826)

King Heondeok 헌덕왕 憲德王
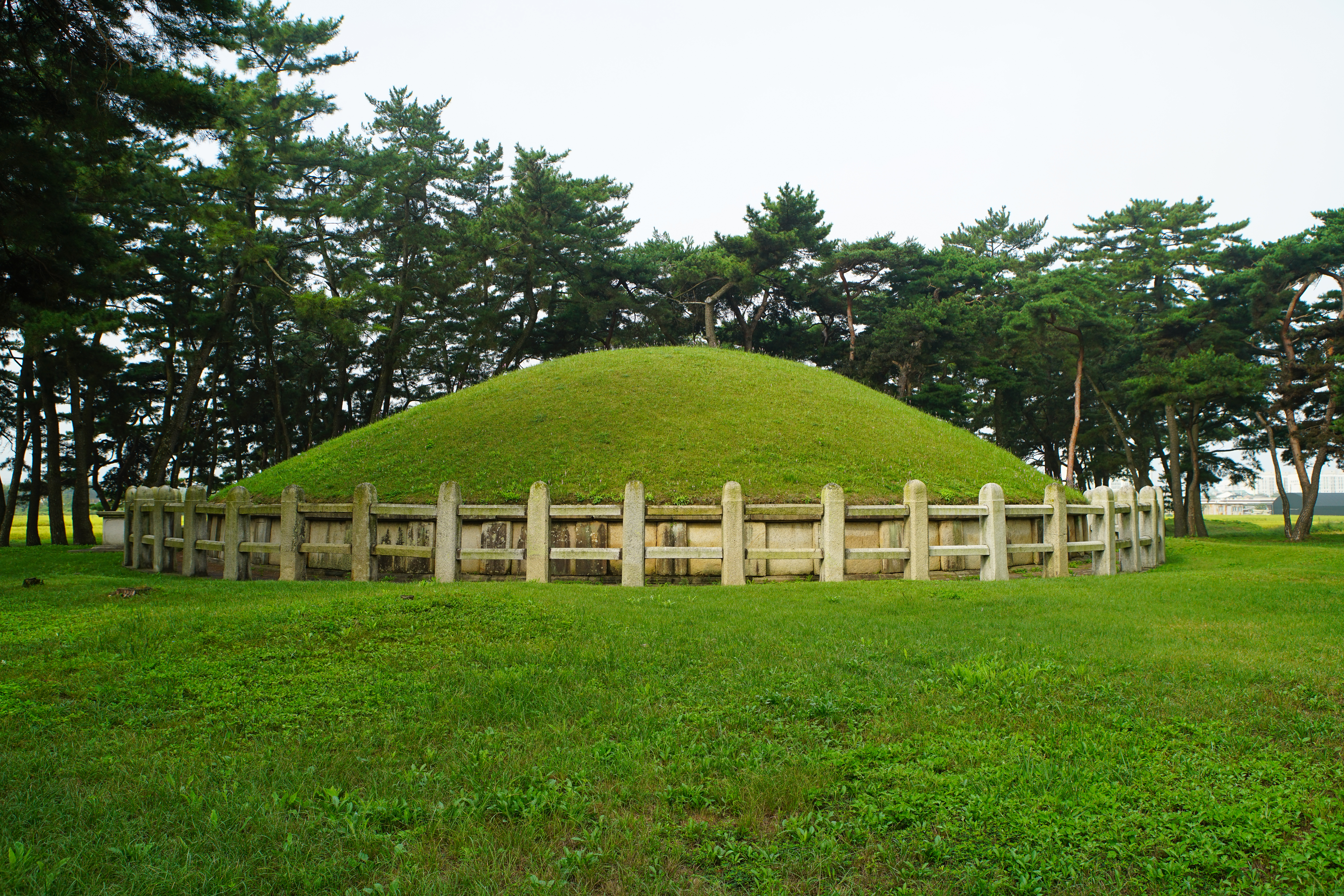
- Tomb of King Heondeok

King of Silla
- Reign: 809-826
- Predecessor: Aejang of Silla
- Successor: Heungdeok of Silla
- Born: Unknown
- Died: 826; Silla
- Burial: Tomb of King Heondeok (presumed), Gyeongju, South Korea
- House: House of Kim
- Father: Prince Hyechung
- Mother: Queen Seongmok

Korean name
- Hangul: 김언승
- Hanja: 金彦昇
- RR: Gim Eonseung
- MR: Kim Ŏnsŭng

Monarch name
- Hangul: 헌덕왕
- Hanja: 憲德王
- RR: Heondeogwang
- MR: Hŏndŏgwang

Heondeok (Korean: 헌덕; r. 809–826) was the 41st to rule the Korean kingdom of Silla. He was the younger brother of King Soseong, and served as regent during the reign of Aejang.

In 790, Heondeok traveled to Tang China where he distinguished himself and received a high position. He returned to Silla, becoming regent after the death of his brother. In 809, he slew the now-adult Aejang and took the throne for himself.

In 810, Heondeok repaired the country's irrigation facilities. He also sent his son Kim Hŏnjang to Tang with gold and silver Buddhist images to pray for the emperor's eternal peace.

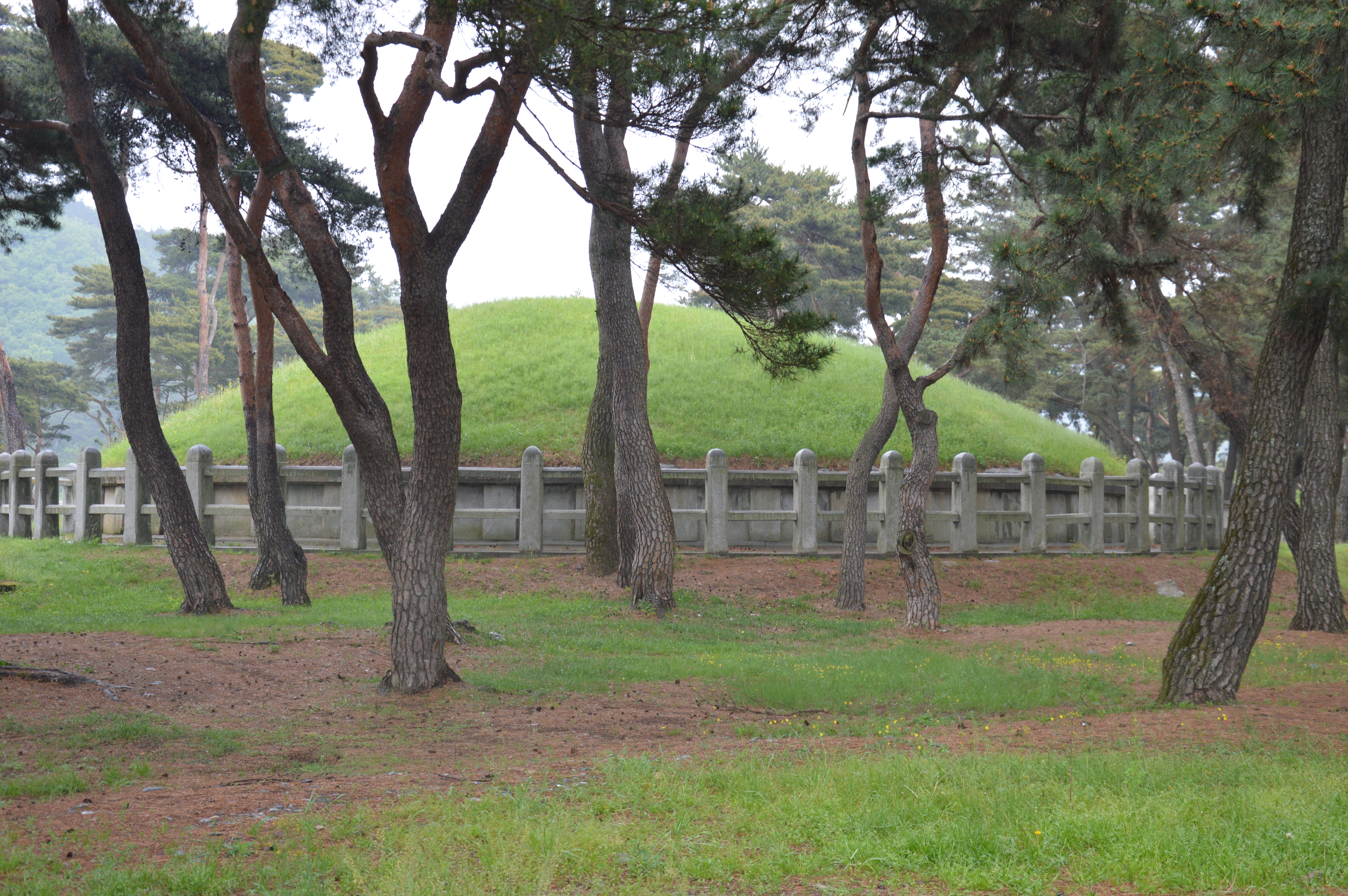
Tumb of king Heondeok of Silla, located in Gyeongju, South Korea

Heondeok's later reign saw the rebellion of Kim Hŏnch'ang in 822, and that of Kim Hŏnch'ang's son in the following year. Both were suppressed. In 824, troubled by threats from the north, the king ordered a 300-ri-long wall built near the Taedong River, which was then the country's northern border.

He is believed to be buried in the Tomb of King Heondeok in Gyeongju, South Korea.

== Family ==
- Grandfather: Wonseong of Silla
- Grandmother: Queen Kim (Lady Yeonhwa; 숙정부인 김씨), of the Kim clan
- Father: Prince Hyech'ung (혜충태자; 750–791/792), posthumously named King Hyech'ung (혜충왕)
- Mother: Queen Sŏngmok, of the Kim clan (성목태후 김씨)
- Wife:
  - Queen Gwisŭng, of the Kim clan (귀승부인 김씨) daughter of Prince Yeyŏng (예영)
    - Unknown son

== See also ==
- Unified Silla
- List of Korean monarchs
- List of Silla people

Heondeok of Silla House of Kim Died: 826
Regnal titles
| Preceded by Aejang | King of Silla; Silla; 809–826 | Succeeded by Heungdeok |
