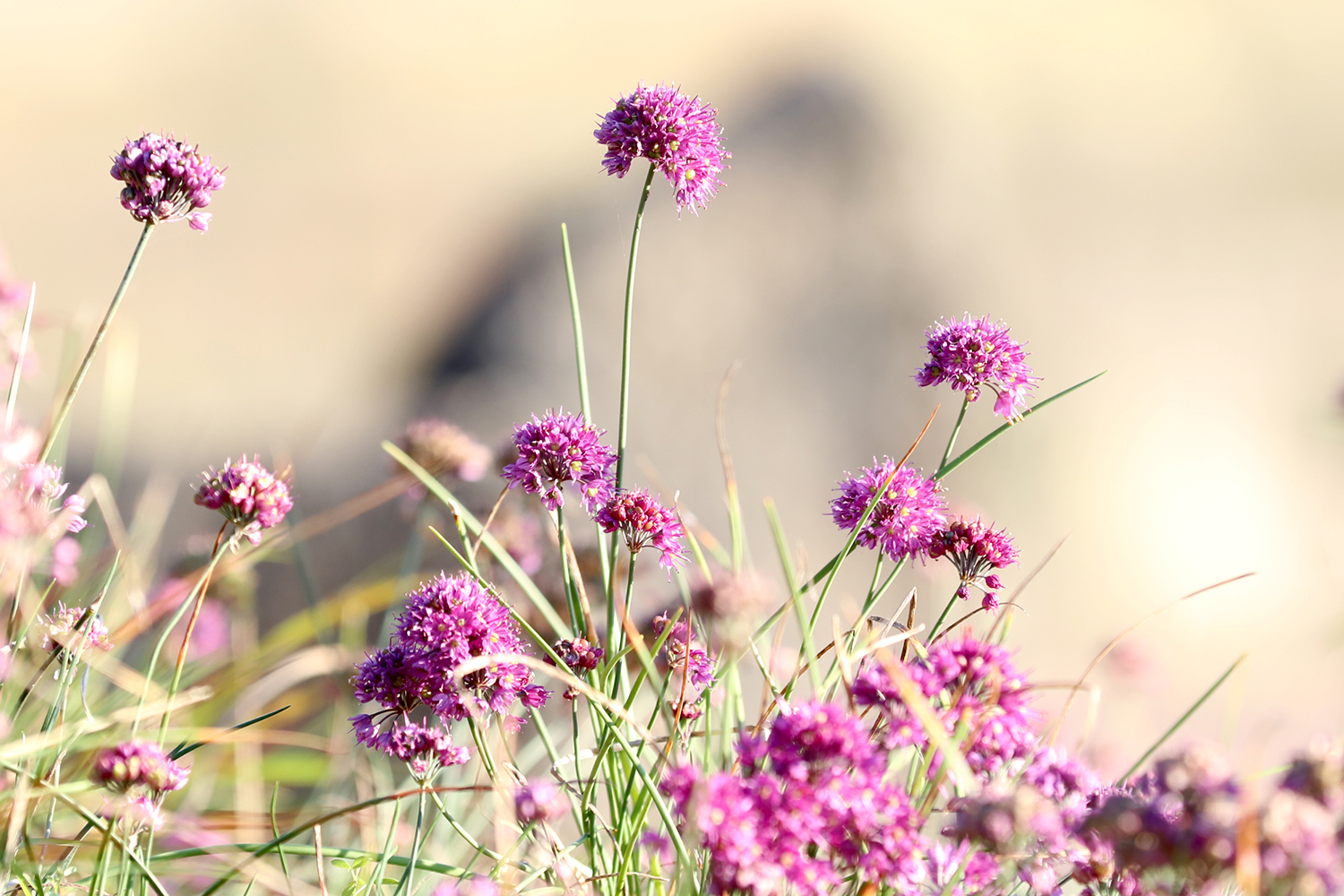
- Halla chive in bloom

Scientific classification
- Kingdom: Plantae
- Clade: Tracheophytes
- Clade: Angiosperms
- Clade: Monocots
- Order: Asparagales
- Family: Amaryllidaceae
- Subfamily: Allioideae
- Genus: Allium
- Species: A. taquetii

Binomial name
- Allium taquetii H.Lév. & Vaniot

= Allium taquetii =

Species of flowering plant

Allium taquetii is a species of Allium native to the southern Korean peninsula and Jeju Island. In Korean it is called the Halla chive (한라부추) because it grows on the slopes of Mt. Halla, the shield volcano that is Jeju Island. Some sources treat it as a synonym of Allium thunbergii.

In Korea it is grown for its floral interest, and its scapes are occasionally eaten as an herb similar to other chives and green onions.
