= Aejang of Silla =

40th monarch of Silla (r. 800–809)

King Aejang 애장왕 哀莊王

King of Silla
- Reign: 800-809
- Predecessor: Soseong of Silla
- Successor: Heondeok of Silla
- Born: 788
- Died: 809; Silla
- House: House of Kim
- Father: Soseong of Silla
- Mother: Queen Park

Korean name
- Hangul: 김중희
- Hanja: 金重熙
- RR: Gim Junghui
- MR: Kim Chunghŭi

Monarch name
- Hangul: 애장왕
- Hanja: 哀莊王
- RR: Aejangwang
- MR: Aejangwang

Former name
- Hangul: 김청명
- Hanja: 金淸明
- RR: Gim Cheongmyeong
- MR: Kim Ch'ŏngmyŏng

Aejang (788–809) (r. 800–809) was the 40th ruler of the Korean kingdom of Silla. He was the eldest son of King Soseong and Queen Gyehwa. He married a lady of the Pak clan.

== Reign ==
In the year 800, Aejang rose to the throne after the death of the former king. Since he was too young to rule on his own because he was 12 at the time, his uncle Kim Eon-seung, who before 800 was serving as Ichan(伊湌,A position that is second highest in rank in the 17 ranks of officials in the Silla system),became a regent for the king as byeongburyryeong(兵部令), a modern equivalent of head of ministry of defense. In 802, Aejang had the great temple of Haeinsa built on Gayasan. In 803, he formed an alliance with Wa. In 806, he forbade the building of new temples. In 809, he was slain along with his brother Chemyeong by his uncle Kim Eon-seung, who had been regent and took the throne for himself.

== Family ==
- Father: Soseong of Silla
- Mother: Queen Gyehwa, of the Kim clan (계화부인 김씨)
- Wife:
  - Queen Park, of the Park clan (왕후 박씨)

== See also ==
- Unified Silla
- List of Korean monarchs
- List of Silla people

Aejang of Silla House of Kim Born: 788 Died: 809
Regnal titles
Preceded by Soseong	King of Silla; Silla; 800–809	Succeeded by Heondeok
