= Tomb of King Heondeok =

Tomb in Gyeongju, South Korea

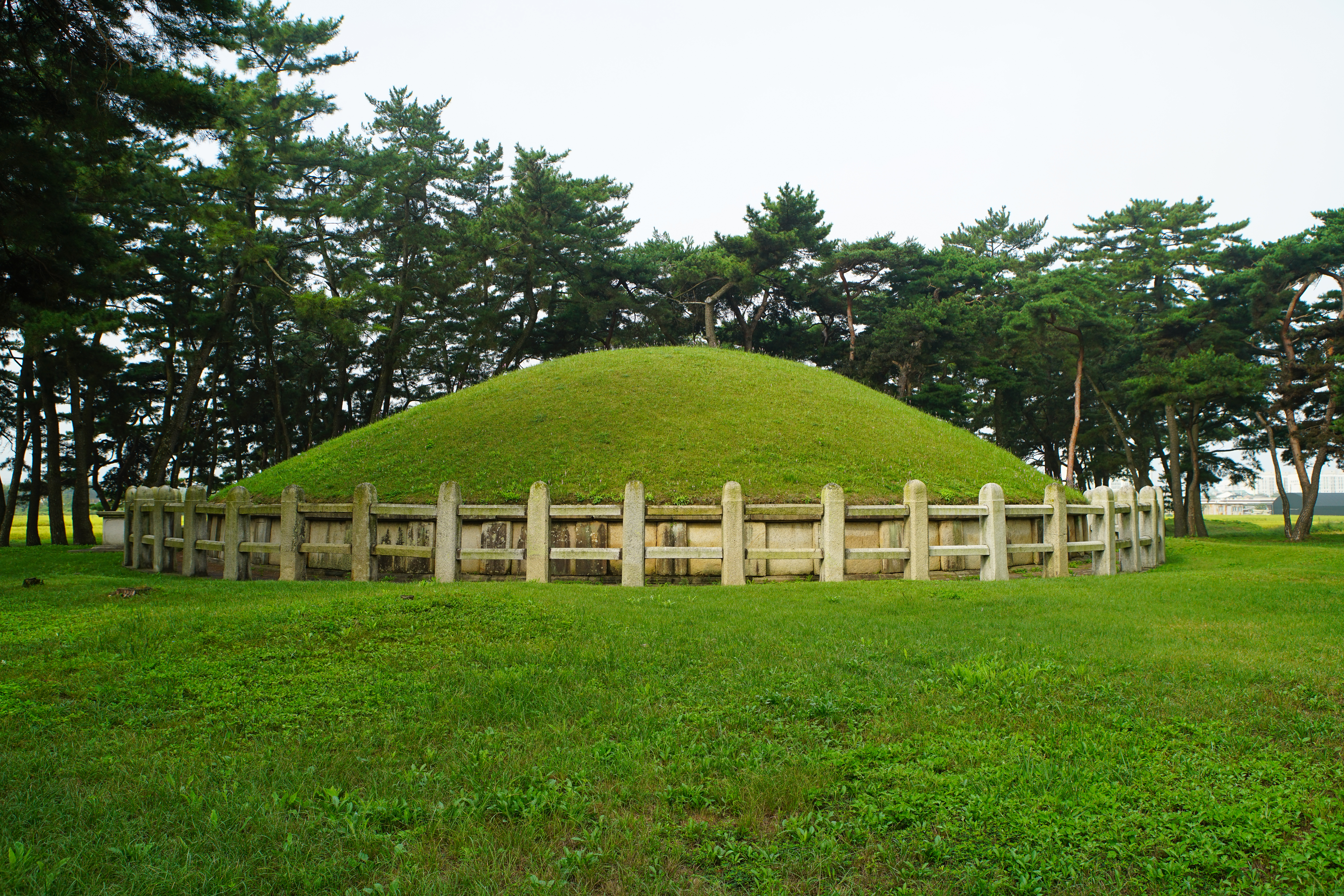
- The tomb (2016)
- Interactive map of Tomb of King Heondeok
- Location: Gyeongju, South Korea
- Coordinates: 35°50′37″N 129°14′41″E
- Built for: Heondeok of Silla (presumed)

Historic Sites of South Korea
- Designated: 1963-01-21
- Reference no.: 29

The Tomb of King Heondeok (Korean: 헌덕왕릉; Hanja: 憲德王陵) is believed to be the tomb of Heondeok of Silla (r. 809–826). It is located in Gyeongju, South Korea. On January 21, 1963, it was designated Historic Site of South Korea No. 29.

It is a tumulus tomb. It was surrounded by twelve stones with carvings of animals of the zodiac; only five of these stones remain. The tomb was repaired in 1970.
