= Haeinsa =

Buddhist temple in South Korea

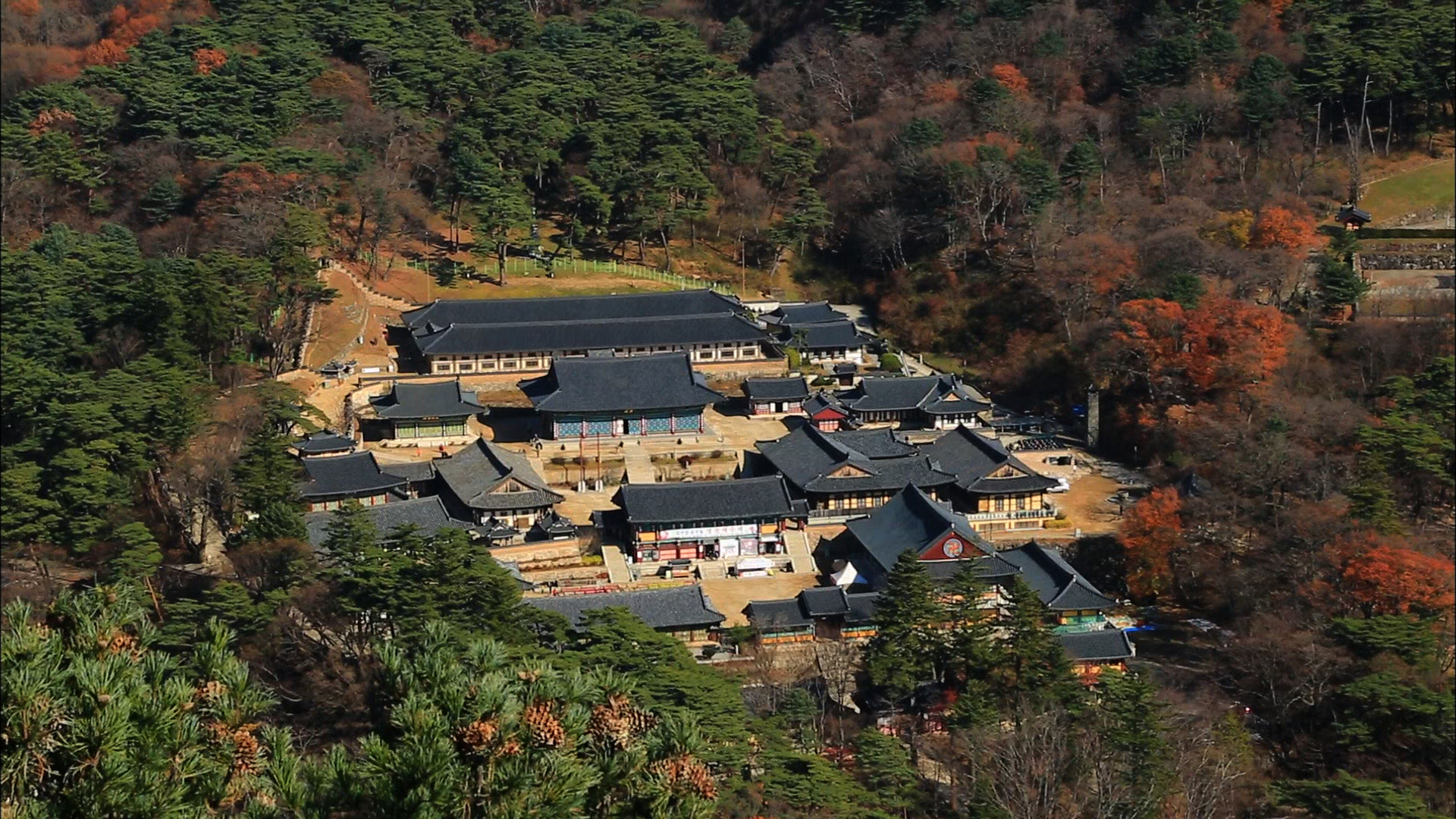
- Overview of the temple (2017)

Religion
- Affiliation: Korean Seon Buddhism
- Sect: Jogye Order

Location
- Location: Gayasan National Park, South Gyeongsang Province, South Korea
- Interactive map of Haeinsa
- Coordinates: 35°48′N 128°06′E

Architecture
- Completed: 802
- UNESCO World Heritage Site
- Official name: Haeinsa Temple Janggyeong Panjeon, the Depositories for the Tripitaka Koreana Woodblocks
- Criteria: Cultural: iv, vi
- Designated: 1995
- Reference no.: 737
- Historic Sites of South Korea
- Official name: Haeinsa Temple, Hapcheon
- Designated: 2009-12-21
- Reference no.: 504

Website
- haeinsa.or.kr

Korean name
- Hangul: 해인사
- Hanja: 海印寺
- RR: Haeinsa
- MR: Haeinsa

Haeinsa (Korean: 해인사) is a Buddhist temple in Gayasan National Park, South Gyeongsang Province, South Korea. It is the head temple of the Jogye Order of Korean Seon Buddhism. Haeinsa is most notable for being the home of the Tripitaka Koreana, the whole of the Buddhist Scriptures carved onto 81,350 wooden printing blocks, which it has housed since 1398.

Haeinsa is one of the Three Jewels Temples, and represents Dharma or the Buddha's teachings. It is still an active Seon practice center in modern times, and was the home temple of the influential Seon master Seongcheol, who died in 1993.

== History ==
The temple was first built in 802. Legend says that two monks of royal Daegaya descent, Suneung and Ijeong, returned from Tang China and healed Aejang of Silla's wife of her illness. In gratitude for Gautama Buddha's mercy, the king ordered the construction of the temple. Another account, by Choe Chi-Won in 900 states that Suneung and his disciple Ijeong, gained the support of a queen dowager who converted to Buddhism and then helped to finance the construction of the temple.

The temple complex was renovated in the 10th century, 1488, 1622, and 1644, respectively. Huirang, the temple abbot enjoyed the patronage of Taejo of Goryeo during that king's reign. Haeinsa was burned down in a fire in 1817 and was rebuilt in 1818. Another renovation in 1964 uncovered a royal robe of Gwanghaegun of Joseon, who was responsible for the 1622 renovation, and an inscription on a ridge beam.

The main hall, Daejeokgwangjeon (대적광전, 大寂光殿: Hall of Great Silence and Light), is unusual because it is dedicated to Vairocana, whereas most other Korean temples house images of Gautama Buddha in their main halls.

The Janggyeong Panjeon of Haeinsa was made a UNESCO World Heritage Site in 1995. The UNESCO committee noted that the buildings housing the Tripiṭaka Koreana are unique because no other historical structure was specifically dedicated to the preservation of artifacts and the techniques used were particularly ingenious.

The temple also holds several official treasures including a realistic wooden carving of a monk and interesting Buddhist paintings, stone pagodas, and lanterns.

=== Crisis ===
During the Korean War, the area surrounding Haeinsa Temple was a site of conflict between North Korean guerillas and the allied forces of South Korea and the United Nations Command. In September 1951, during an anti-guerilla bombing campaign, Air Force Colonel Kim Young-hwan was ordered to destroy the temple. He refused, instead leading his squad of fighter jets over the temple without dropping a single bomb.

== Janggyeong Panjeon (National Treasure No. 32) ==
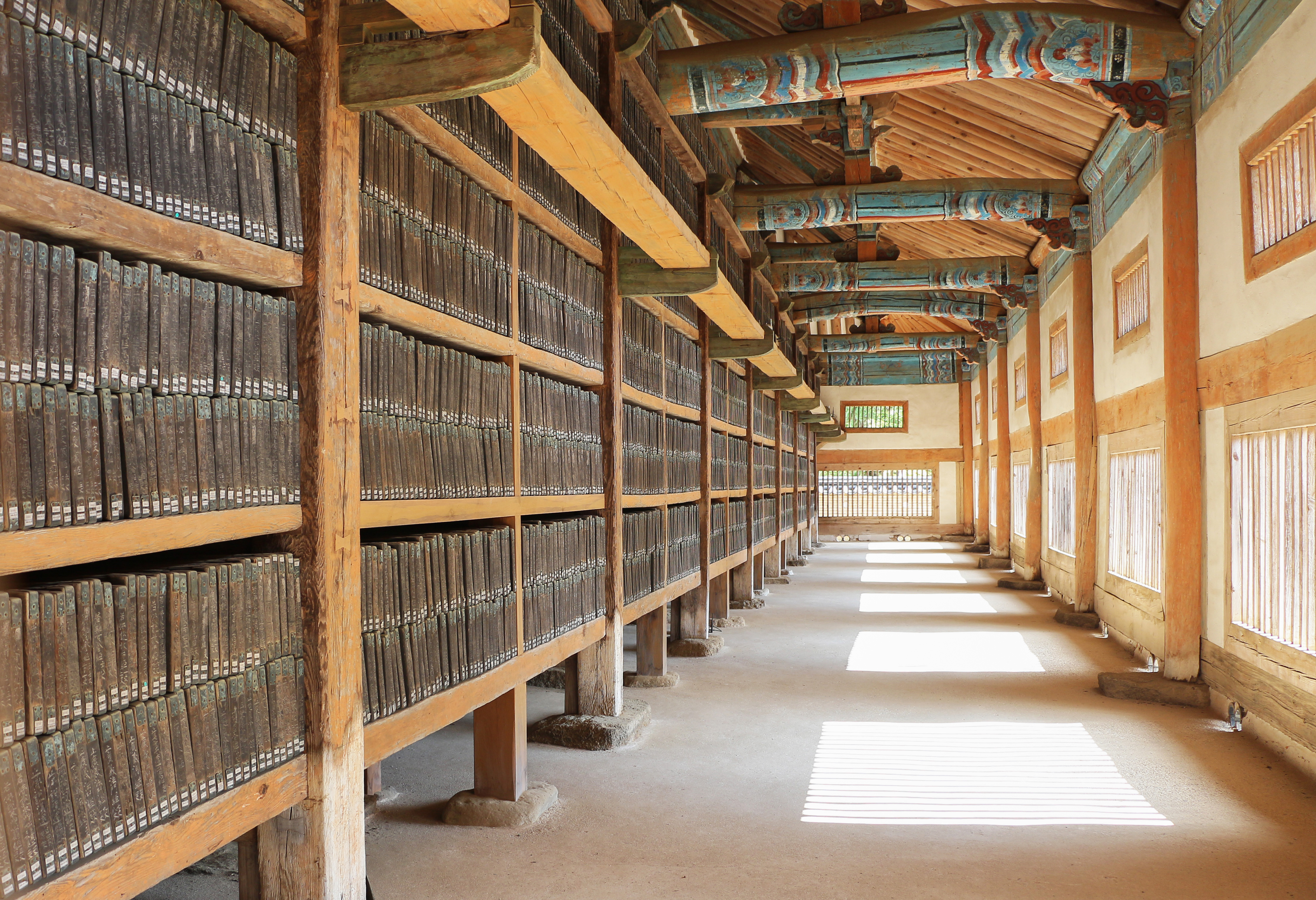
Tripitaka Koreana woodblocks at Haeinsa

The storage halls known as the Janggyeong Panjeon complex are the depository for the Tripiṭaka Koreana woodblocks at Haeinsa and were also designated by the Korean government as a National Treasure on December 20, 1962. They are some of the largest wooden storage facilities in the world. Remarkably, the halls were untouched during the Japanese invasions of Korea (1592–98) and were spared from the 1818 fire that burned most of the temple complex down. All told, the storage halls have survived seven serious fires and one near-bombing during the Korean War when a pilot disobeyed orders because he remembered that the temple held priceless treasures.

Janggyeong Panjeon complex is the oldest part of the temple and houses the 81,258 wooden printing blocks from the Tripiṭaka Koreana. Although the exact construction date of the hall that houses the Tripiṭaka Koreana is uncertain, it is believed that Sejo of Joseon expanded and renovated it in 1457. The complex is made up of four halls arranged in a rectangle and the style is very plain because of its use as a storage facility. The northern hall is called Beopbojeon (Hall of Dharma) and the southern hall is called the Sudara-jang ("Hall of Sutras"). These two main halls are 60.44 meters in length, 8.73 meters in width, and 7.8 meters in height. Both have fifteen rooms with two adjoining rooms. Additionally, there are two small halls on the east and west which house two small libraries.

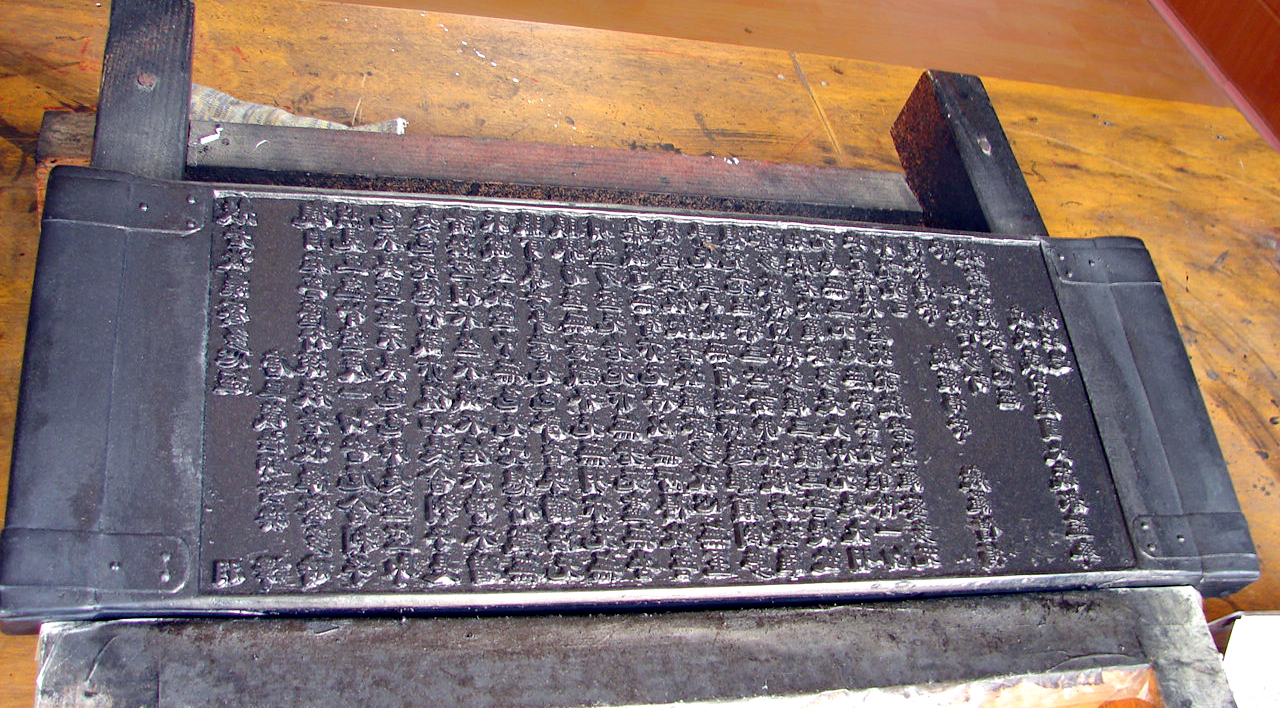
Copy of a Tripiṭaka Koreana woodblock used to allow visitors to make an inked print of the woodblock on the Haeinsa complex grounds. See here for an image of the woodblock print.

Several ingenious preservation techniques are utilized to preserve the wooden printing blocks. The architects also utilized nature to help preserve the Tripitaka. The storage complex was built at the highest point of the temple and is 655 meters above sea level. Janggyeong Panjeon faces southwest to avoid damp southeasterly winds from the valley below and is blocked from the cold north wind by mountain peaks. Different sized windows on the north and south sides of both main halls are used for ventilation, utilizing principles of hydrodynamics. The windows were installed in every hall to maximize ventilation and regulate temperature. The clay floors were filled with charcoal, calcium oxide, salt, lime, and sand, which reduce humidity when it rains by absorbing excess moisture which is then retained during the dry winter months. The roof is also made with clay and the bracketing and wood rafters prevent sudden changes in temperature. Additionally, no part of the complex is exposed to sun. Apparently, animals, insects, and birds avoid the complex but the reason for this is unknown. These sophisticated preservation measures are widely credited as the reason the woodblocks have survived in such fantastic condition to this day.

In 1970, a modern storage complex was built utilizing modern preservation techniques but when test woodblocks were found to have mildewed, the intended move was canceled and the woodblocks remained at Haeinsa.

== Tourism ==
It also offers Temple Stay programs where visitors can experience Buddhist culture.

== Gallery ==
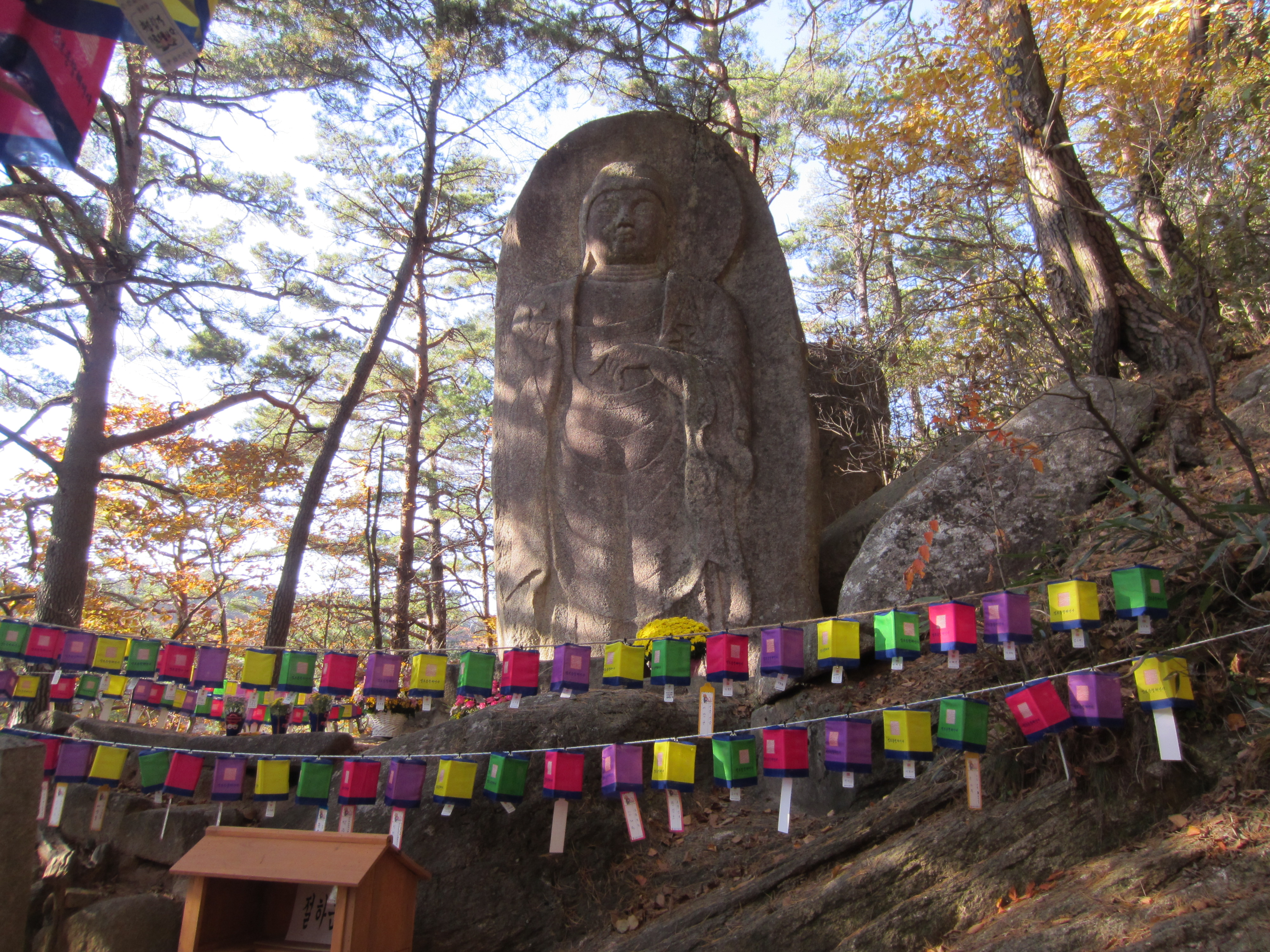
A Buddha statue inside the temple's inner grounds

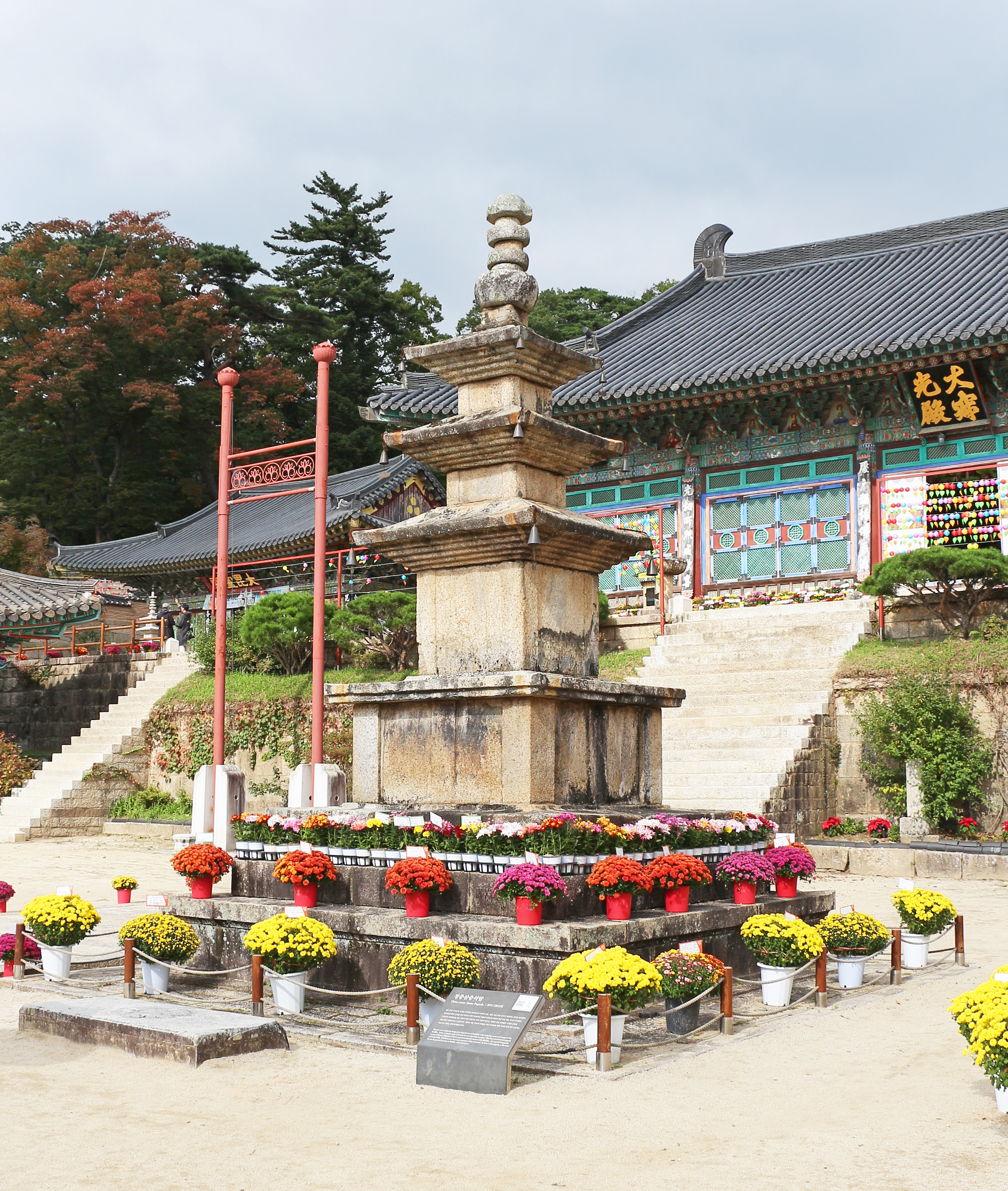
Birotap Pagoda

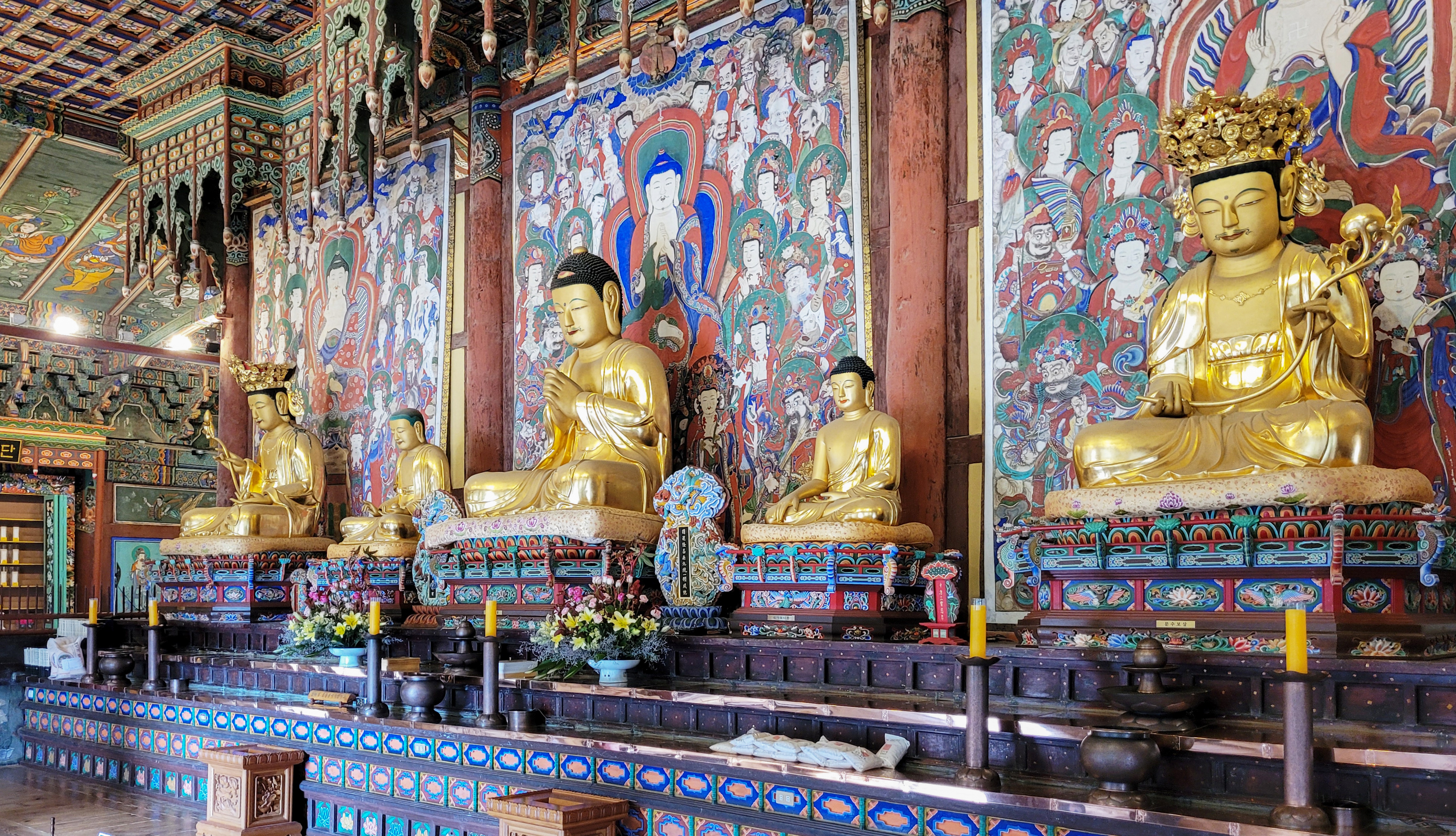
Statues in Daejeokgwangjeon

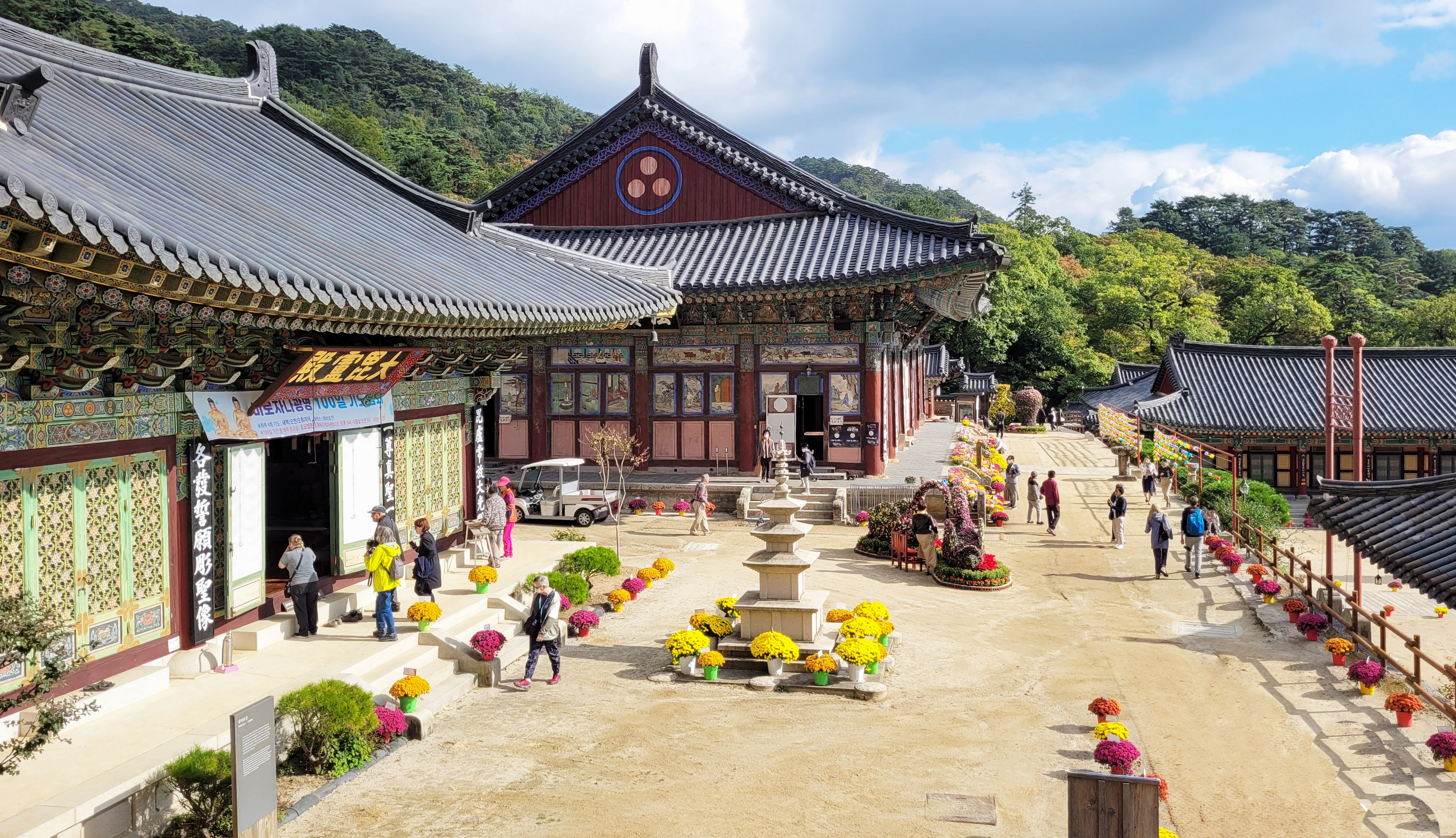
General view

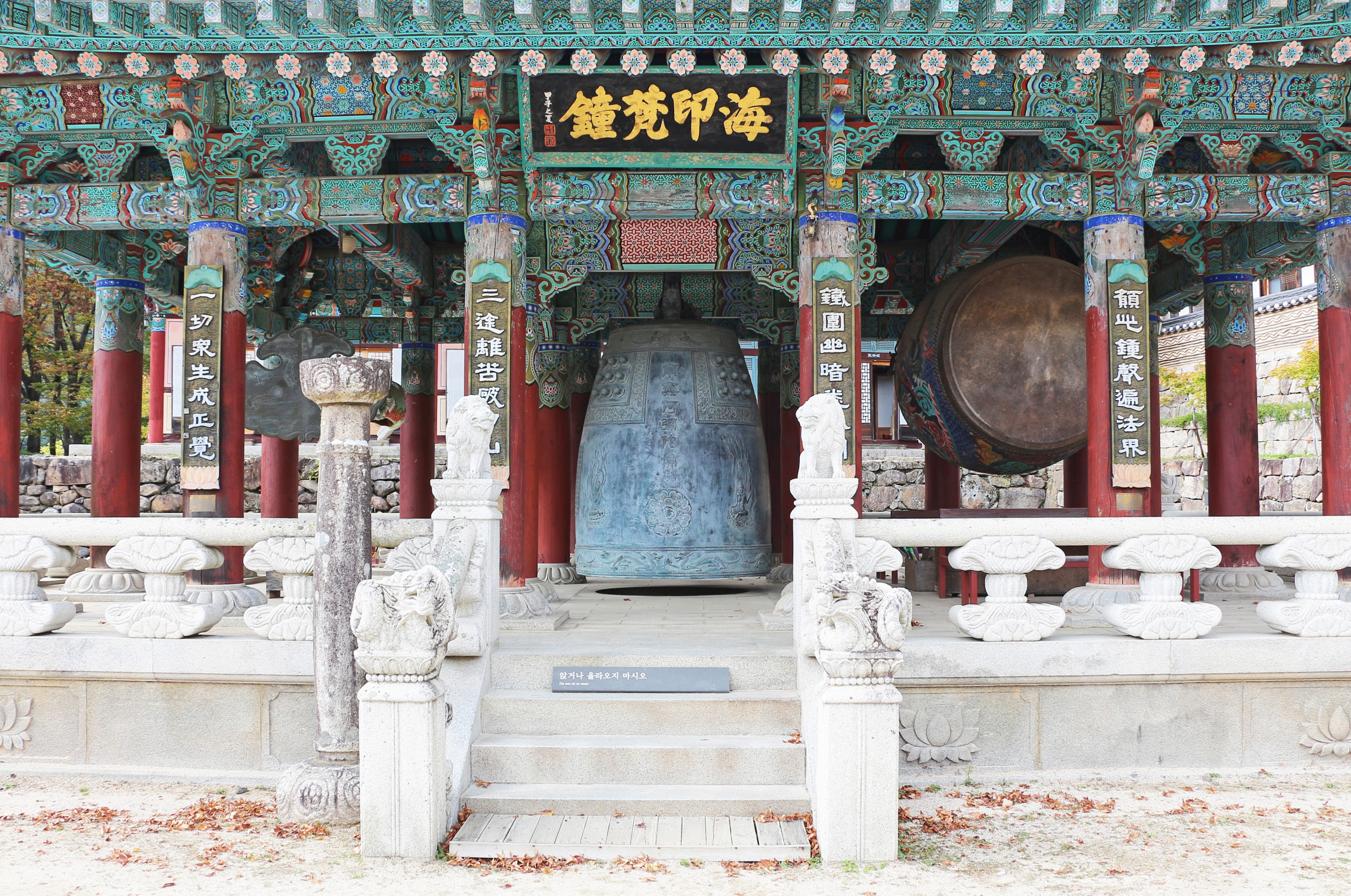
Bell and drums in the temple

== See also ==
- Korean Buddhist temples
- Korean Buddhism
- Korean temple cuisine
- Temple Stay
- Three Jewel Temples of Korea
