= Tomb of King Wonseong =

Tomb in Gyeongju, South Korea

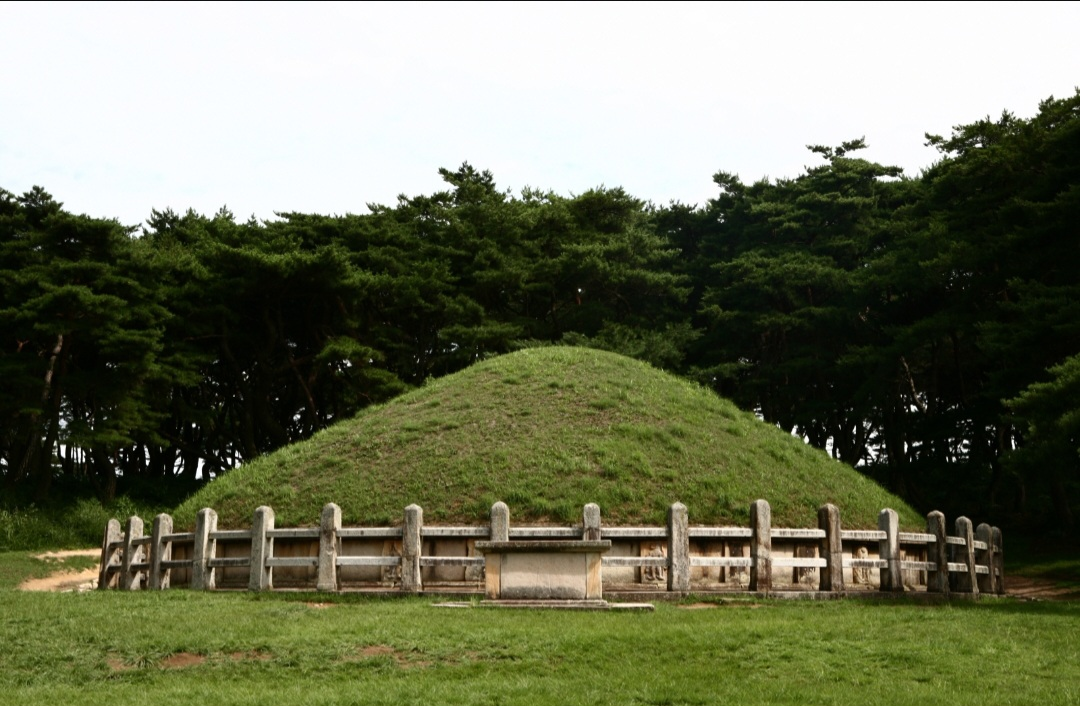
- The tomb
- Interactive map of Tomb of King Wonseong
- Location: Gyeongju, South Korea
- Coordinates: 35°45′29″N 129°19′10″E
- Built for: Wonseong of Silla (presumed)

Historic Sites of South Korea
- Designated: 1963-01-21
- Reference no.: 26

The Tomb of King Wonseong (Korean: 원성왕릉; Hanja: 元聖王陵) is believed to be the tomb of the Silla monarch Wonseong (r. 785–798). It is located in what is now Gyeongju, South Korea. It is also known by the name Kwaerŭng (괘릉; 掛陵). On January 21, 1963, it was made Historic Site of South Korea No. 26.

== Description ==
The tomb is among the finest extant Silla-era tombs. It is a tumulus tomb that is 23 m (75 ft) in diameter and 6 m (20 ft) in height. It is surrounded by twelve stones with animals of the zodiac carved in them. The carvings are considered to be among the best of its kind. It has a stone fence with 25 pillars surrounding it. The pillars are all original, but the railing between the pillars are recent restorations. Near the tomb are various original statues.

It is not known with certainty if the tomb belongs to Wonseong or not. It is widely believed to be his tomb because the Samguk sagi has it that his tomb was near the former temple Sungboksa, and this temple's site is indeed nearby.
