= Tomb of King Heungdeok =

Tomb in Gyeongju, South Korea

Tomb of Heungdeok of Silla
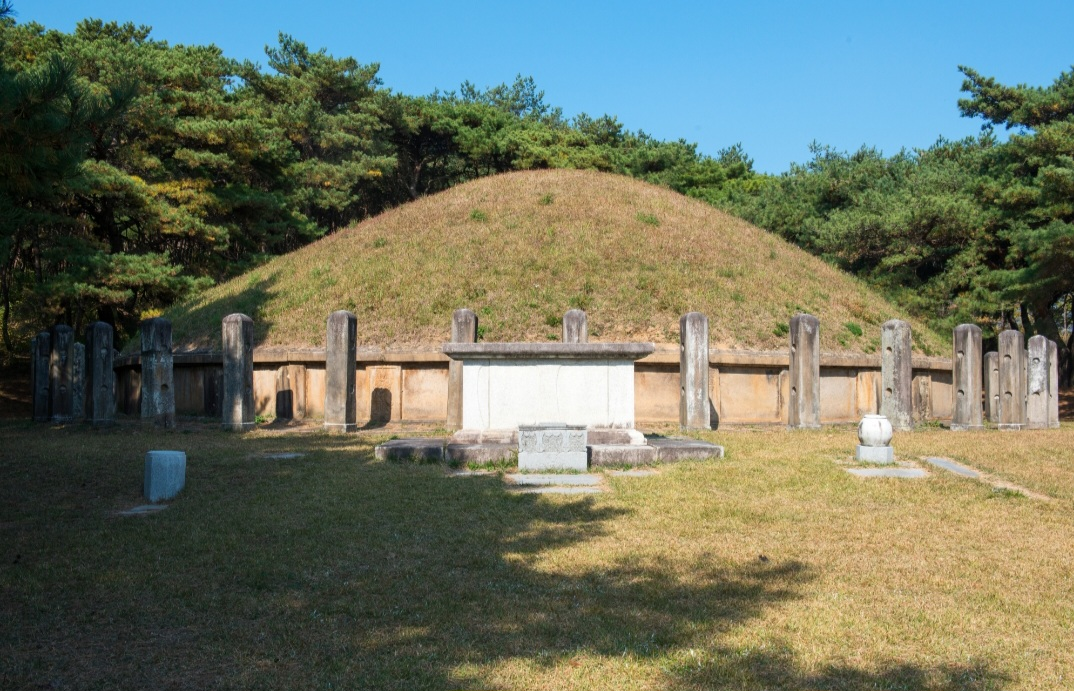
- The tomb
- Interactive map of Tomb of Heungdeok of Silla
- Location: Gyeongju, South Korea
- Coordinates: 36°01′08″N 129°12′28″E
- Built for: Heungdeok of Silla

Historic Sites of South Korea
- Designated: 1963-01-21
- Reference no.: 30

The Tomb of King Heungdeok (Korean: 흥덕왕릉; Hanja: 興德王陵) is the burial site of Heungdeok of Silla (r. 826–836). It is located in Gyeongju, South Korea. On January 21, 1963, it was designated Historic Site of South Korea No. 30.

It is considered to be one of the best-preserved Silla tombs. It is believed to belong to Heungdeok because of stone fragments discovered near the site had his name. It is a tumulus tomb. It has twelve engravings of animals of the zodiac surrounding it. It also has four stone lion sculptures surrounding it, as well as stone figures of civil and military officials.
