= Wonseong of Silla =

38th monarch of Silla (r. 785–798)

King Wonseong 원성왕 元聖王
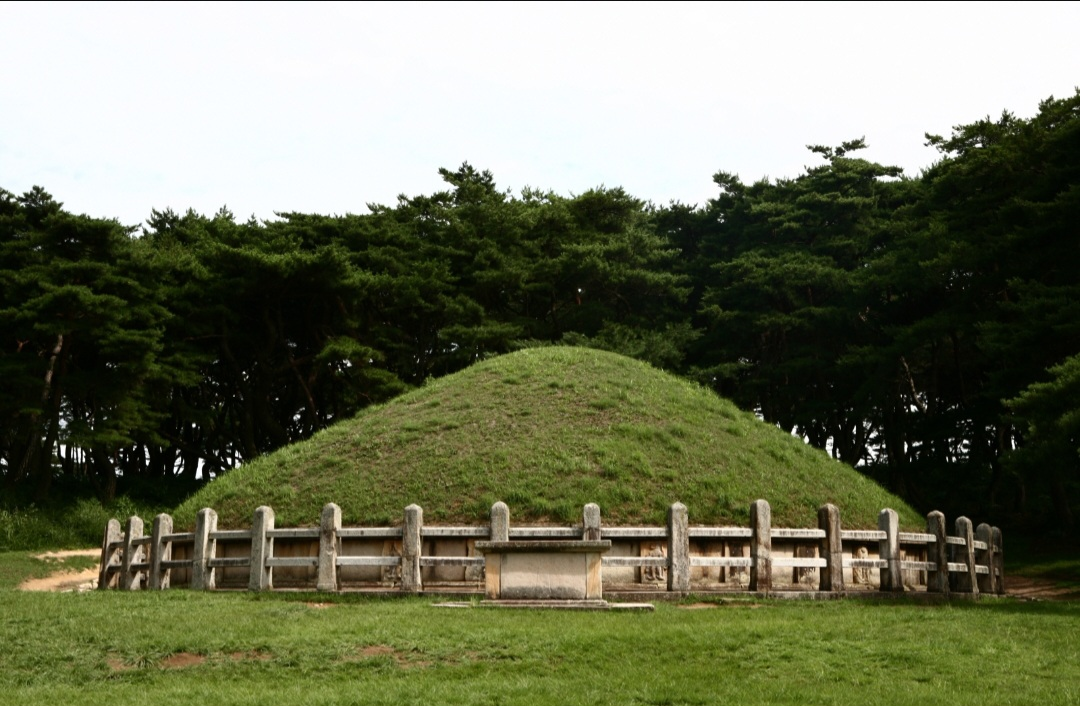
- Tomb of King Wonseong

King of Silla
- Reign: 785–798
- Coronation: 785
- Predecessor: King Seondeok of Silla
- Successor: Soseong of Silla
- Born: c.720s
- Died: February 12, 799/December 29 798, Lunar Calendar; Silla
- Burial: Tomb of King Wonseong, Gyeongju
Posthumous name
- King Wonseong (元聖王, 원성왕)
Temple name
- Liezu (烈祖, 열조)
- Father: Kim Hyo-yang
- Mother: Lady Gye-o

- Wonseong of Silla
- Hangul: 김경신
- Hanja: 金敬信
- RR: Gim Gyeongsin
- MR: Kim Kyŏngsin

Monarch name
- Hangul: 원성왕
- Hanja: 元聖王
- RR: Wonseongwang
- MR: Wŏnsŏngwang

Wonseong (r. 785–798, died 798) was the 38th to rule the Korean kingdom of Silla. He was a twelfth-generation descendant of King Naemul. His father was Kim Hyo-yang, and his mother was Lady Gye-o, the daughter of Park Chang-do. Wonseong's queen was Lady Yeonhwa, the daughter of Gakgan Kim Sin-sul.

Wonseong of Silla ruled out the Resolution of the Ji-jeong with the Yang-sang in 780 before becoming king. He killed Hyegong of Silla and contributed to the throne. From this point of view, he is a figure closely related to his appearance and has been opposed to the monarchy of the royal family since King Gyeongdeok. Hyegong of Silla was appointed to Sangdaedeung in 780 (King Seongdeok 1) for his work to calm down the turmoil at the end of King Hyegong's reign.

In 780, Wonseong fought alongside his kinsman Kim Yang-sang to defeat the rebellion of Kim Ji-jeong. The rebellion left King Hyegong dead, and Kim took the throne as King Seondeok. The new king gave Wonseong the title of sangdaedeung. After Seondeok died without an heir, the nobles chose Wonseong as the new king.

In 787, Wonseong sent tribute to Tang China and requested a title. In 788, he established the national civil service examination for the first time, on the Tang model.

After his death in 798, the king was buried south of Bongdeoksa.

== Family ==
Parents

- Father: Kim Hyo-yang (김효양)
- Mother: Lady Gye-o (계오부인박씨), the daughter of Prak Chang-do (박창근)

Consorts and their respective issue:

- Queen Kim (Lady Yeonhwa; 숙정부인 김씨), of the Kim clan, the daughter of Gakgan Kim Sin-sul (김신술)
  - Son: Crown Prince Hyechung (혜충태자; 750–791/792), posthumously named King Hyechung (혜충왕)
    - Daughter-in-law: Queen Seongmok, of the Kim clan ( 성목태후 김씨)
      - Grandson Soseong of Silla (소성왕; died 800)
      - Grandson: Heondeok of Silla (헌덕왕; died 826)
      - Grandson: Kim Chung-gong (김충공)
      - Grandson: Heungdeok of Silla (흥덕왕; 777–836)
    - Daughter-in-law: Concubine Park (포도부인 박씨)
      - Grandson: Huigang of Silla (희강왕; died 838)
      - Grand-daughter: Princess Gwibo (귀보부인)
  - Son: Prince Uiyeong (의영; d.794), posthumously named Crown Prince Heonpyeong (헌평태자)
    - Grandson: Prince Sungbin (숭빈)
  - Son: Prince Ye–yeong (예영), posthumously named King Hyegang (혜강왕)
    - Grandson: Prince Heonjeong (김헌정)
    - Grandson: Prince Kim Gyun-jung (김균정)
    - Grand-daughter: Madam Gwiseun (귀승부인)– became Queen Consort of Heondeok of Silla
  - Daughter: Princess Daryong (대룡부인)
  - Daughter: Princess Soryong (소룡부인)

== See also ==
- Unified Silla
- List of Korean monarchs
- List of Silla people

Wonseong of Silla House of Kim Died: 798
Regnal titles
Preceded by King Seondeok	King of Silla; Silla; 785–798	Succeeded by Soseong
