= Daejeokgwangjeon =

Type of building in Korean Buddhist temples

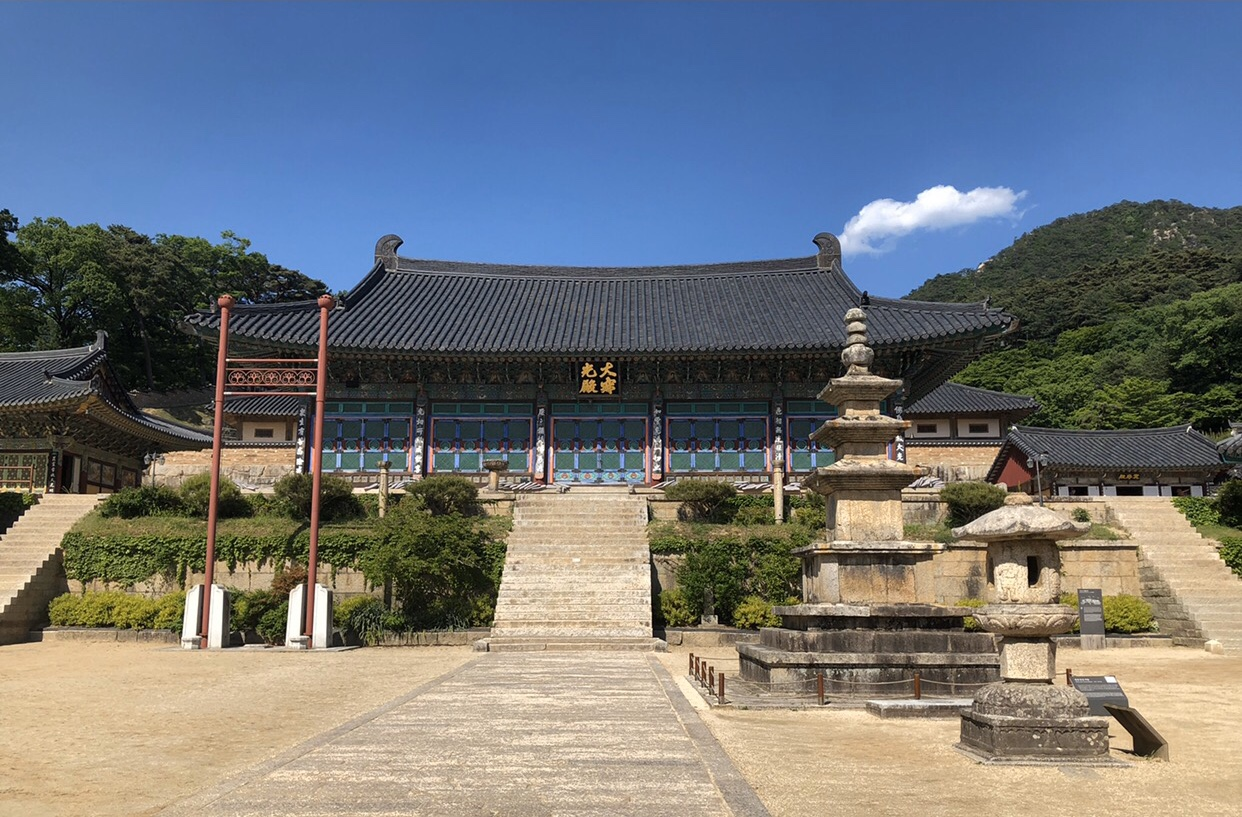
- Daejeokgwangjeon of Haeinsa

Korean name
- Hangul: 대적광전
- Hanja: 大寂光殿
- RR: daejeokgwangjeon
- MR: taejŏkkwangjŏn

Daejeokgwangjeon (Korean: 대적광전; Hanja: 大寂光殿) is a type of building that enshrines Vairocana (Birojanabul) in Korean Buddhist temples. Jeokgwang means light of true wisdom that breaks Kleshas and shines in a calm state. The building is also called hwaeomjeon (화엄전; 華嚴殿) as it is the main hall of Hwaeom temples or birojeon (비로전; 毘盧殿) as it enshrines Birojanabul.

Vairocana, Amitābha, and Sakyamuni which represent Trikaya are usually enshrined in the building and taenghwa is placed behind each of them. Manjushri and Samantabhadra are placed next to Vairocana. Since daejeokgwangjeon often holds a status equivalent to that of daeungjeon, sinjungdan (신중단; 神衆壇) dedicated to Dharmapala and yeongdan (영단; 靈壇) dedicated to spirits are placed in the building.

Notable examples are daejeokgwangjeon of Haeinsa and bogwangmyeongjeon of Wibongsa.

== See also ==
- Daeungjeon: Building in Korean Buddhist temples that enshrines Sakyamuni

== Gallery ==
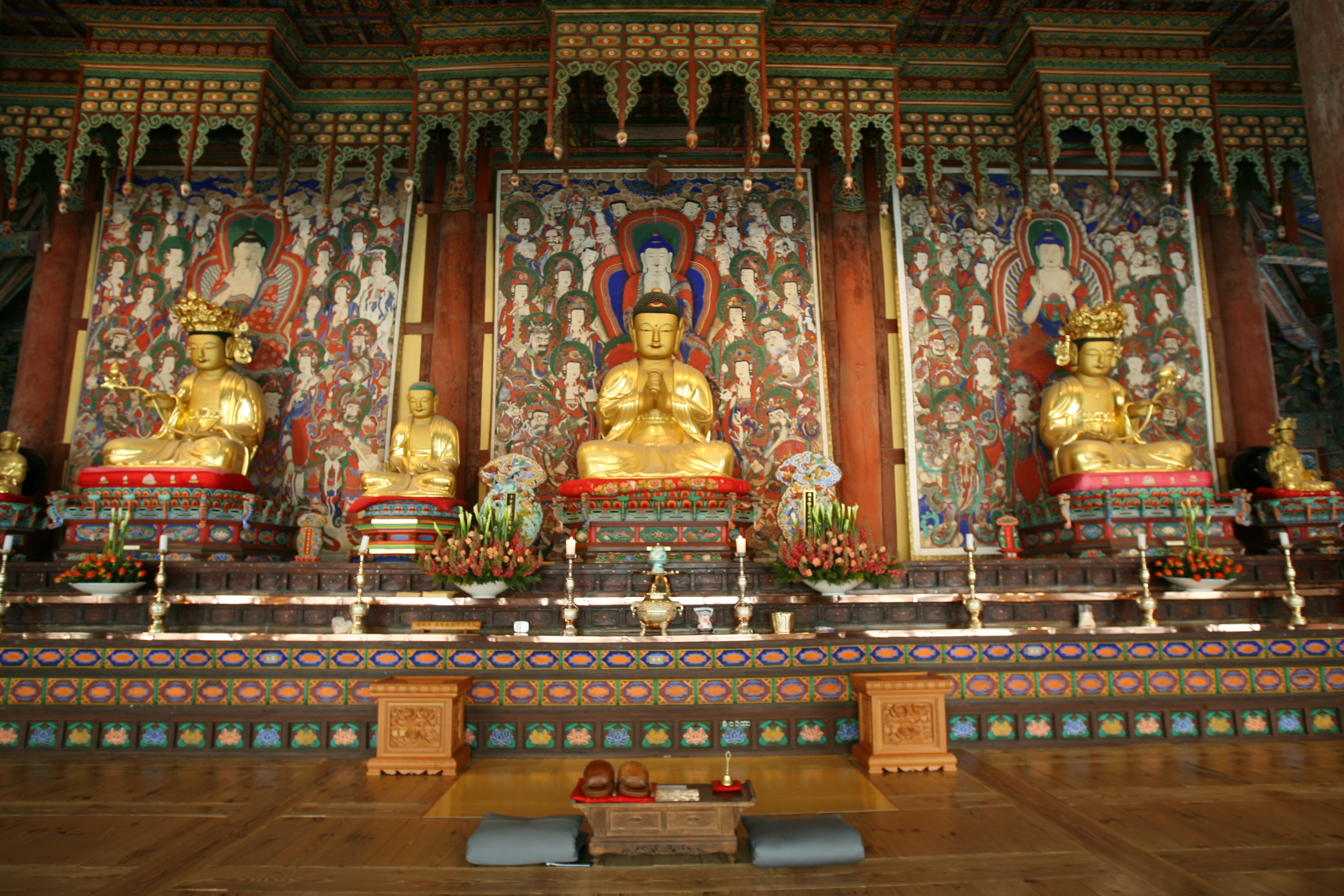
Daejeokgwangjeon of Haeinsa
