= Heungdeok of Silla =

42nd monarch of Silla (r. 826–836)

King Heungdeok 흥덕왕 興德王
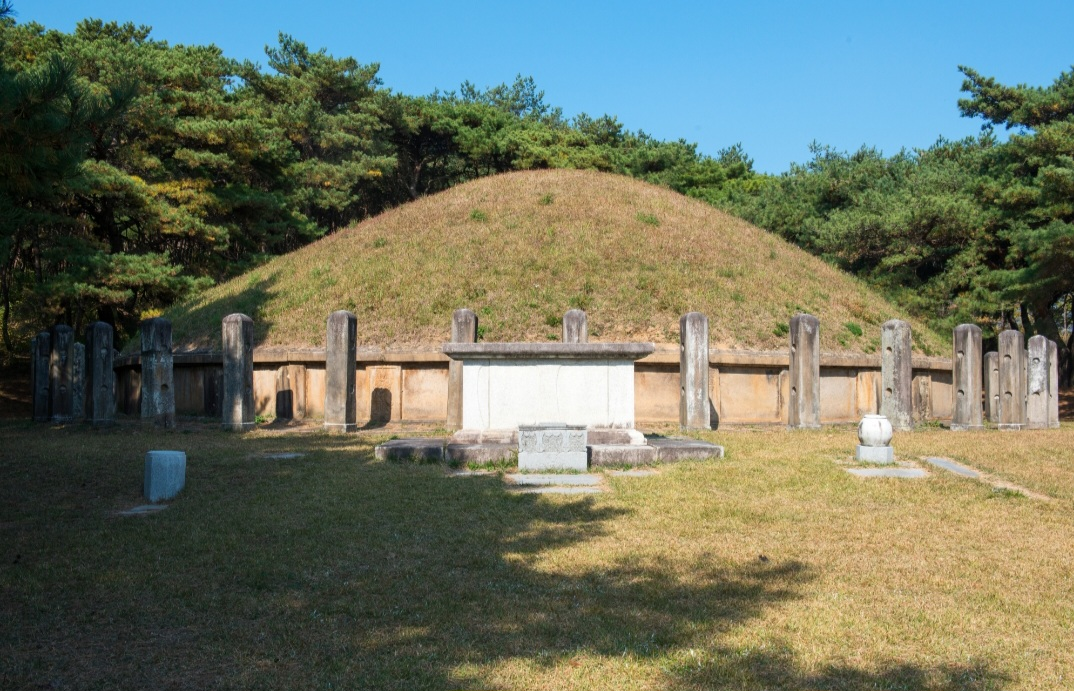
- Tomb of King Heungdeok

King of Silla
- Reign: 826-836
- Predecessor: Heondeok of Silla
- Successor: Huigang of Silla
- Born: 777
- Died: 836; Silla
- Burial: Tomb of King Heungdeok, Gyeongju, South Korea
- House: House of Kim
- Father: Prince Hyechung
- Mother: Queen Seongmok

Korean name
- Hangul: 김경휘
- Hanja: 金景徽
- RR: Gim Gyeonghwi
- MR: Kim Kyŏnghwi

Monarch name
- Hangul: 흥덕왕
- Hanja: 興德王
- RR: Heungdeogwang
- MR: Hŭngdŏgwang

Heungdeok (777–836; r. 826–836) was the 42nd ruler of the Korean kingdom of Silla. He was the younger brother of King Heondeok. He was married to Queen Jeongmok, the daughter of King Soseong.

Upon rising to the throne, Heungdeok made Kim Yu-jing his prime minister (sijung) and appointed Chang Pogo to the command of the Cheonghae Garrison. Chang later used this as a basis for dominating Silla politics through the mid-9th century.

In 834, the king revised the colors of official dress. The same year, he also prohibited certain styles of clothing (including extravagant clothing of the Court of Silla, which had been made extravagant under the influence and adoption of Tang dynasty attire; banbi, a short-sleeved garment which had been introduced from the Tang dynasty in the times of Kim Chunchu) and strictly regulated the clothing (21 clothing items, which including the official's hat bokdu (幞頭)) and use of textiles according to a person's golpum. He also issued an edict forbidding "excessive luxuries" to the common people. He also issued the ban edicts of gold and silver ware even for people who held the status of jingol, only allowing the use of silver-plated ware; thus intending to return to the time (mid-Silla period) when the royalty of Silla had the monopoly over gold and silver ware.

In 836, Heungdeok died without an heir, which sparked a bloody power struggle between rival members of the royal family of Silla. His tomb was in the north of Angang-hyeon, now Angang-eup, Gyeongju, South Korea.

== Family ==
- Grandfather: Wonseong of Silla
- Grandmother: Queen Kim (Lady Yeonhwa; 숙정부인 김씨), of the Kim clan, the daughter of
- Father: Prince Hyechung (혜충태자; 750–791/792), posthumously named King Hyechung (혜충왕)
- Mother: Queen Seongmok, of the Kim clan (성목태후 김씨)
- Wife:
  - Queen Jeongmok, of the Kim clan (정목왕후 김씨), known as Madan Janhwa (귀승부인) the daughter of King Soseong.

== In popular culture ==
- Portrayed by Park Sang Hyun in the 2004 KBS TV series Emperor of the Sea

== See also ==
- Unified Silla
- List of Korean monarchs
- List of Silla people

Heungdeok of Silla House of Kim Born: 777 Died: 836
Regnal titles
Preceded by Heondeok	King of Silla; Silla; 826–836	Succeeded by Huigang
