= Gayasan (North and South Gyeongsang) =

Mountain in South Korea

Coordinates: 35.8221°N 128.1179°E

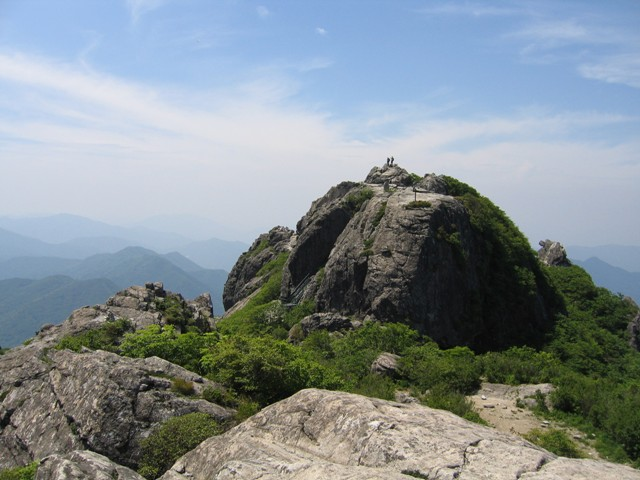
- The Sanghwang peak of Gaya Mountain in 2004

Highest point
- Elevation: 1,433 m (4,701 ft)

Geography
- Location: North Gyeongsang Province, South Korea

Korean name
- Hangul: 가야산
- Hanja: 伽倻山
- RR: Gayasan
- MR: Kayasan

Gayasan (Korean: 가야산), also known as Gaya Mountain, is a mountain in North Gyeongsang Province, eastern South Korea. This mountain reaches an elevation of 1,433 metres. It is located in Gayasan National Park, which is named in honor of this mountain.

This mountain has two major peaks: one of them is Sangwangbong Peak, for which the height is 1,430 meters, and the other, Chulbulbong, is 1,433 above sea level.

== See also ==
- List of mountains in Korea
