= Soseong of Silla =

39th monarch of Silla (r. 798–800)

King Soseong 소성왕 昭聖王

King of Silla
- Reign: 798-800
- Predecessor: Wonseong of Silla
- Successor: Aejang of Silla
- Born: Unknown
- Died: 800; Silla
- House: House of Kim
- Father: Prince Hyechung
- Mother: Queen Seongmok

- Soseong of Silla
- Hangul: 김준옹
- Hanja: 金俊邕
- RR: Gim Junong
- MR: Kim Chunong

Monarch name
- Hangul: 소성왕
- Hanja: 昭聖王
- RR: Soseongwang
- MR: Sosŏngwang

Soseong (died 800) (r. 798–800) was the 39th to rule the Korean kingdom of Silla. He was the grandson of King Wonseong, his father Kim In-gyeom having died before he could take the throne. He married Lady Gyehwa, the daughter of the daeachan Suk-myeong.

Soseong died about seventeen months after taking the throne. On his deathbed, King Soseong, he called his younger brothers, including Eonseung, and told them that he would hand over the throne to his son as his grandfather had wished, and that they should respect the succession. Aejang succeeded Soseong and remained king until 809, when he was killed by his uncle Eonseung, which brought on a renewal of the succession strife which typified later Unified Silla.

Soseong of Silla, who was raised in the royal court before he ascended the throne, was appointed daeachan in 789 and went to the Tang dynasty as an envoy that year. He was appointed sijung in October 791, but left the post due to illness in August 792 and became head of the Ministry of War. When his uncle Uiyoung died in February 794, he was proclaimed Crown Prince in the year 795.

== Family ==
- Grandfather: Wonseong of Silla
- Grandmother: Queen Kim (Lady Yeonhwa)(숙정부인 김씨), of the Kim clan
- Father: Prince Hyechung (혜충태자; 750–791/792), posthumously named King Hyechung (혜충왕)
- Mother: Queen Seongmok, of the Kim clan ( 성목태후 김씨)
- Wife:
  - Queen Gyehwa, of the Kim clan (계화부인 김씨)
    - Son: Aejang of Silla (애장왕; 788–809)–was the 40th ruler of the Korean kingdom of Silla
    - Son: Prince Chemyeong (체명)
    - Daughter: Madame Janghwa (장화부인)– became the Queen consort of Heungdeok of Silla

== See also ==
- Unified Silla
- List of Korean monarchs
- List of Silla people

Soseong of Silla House of Kim Died: 800
Regnal titles
Preceded by Wonseong	King of Silla; Silla; 798–800	Succeeded by Aejang
