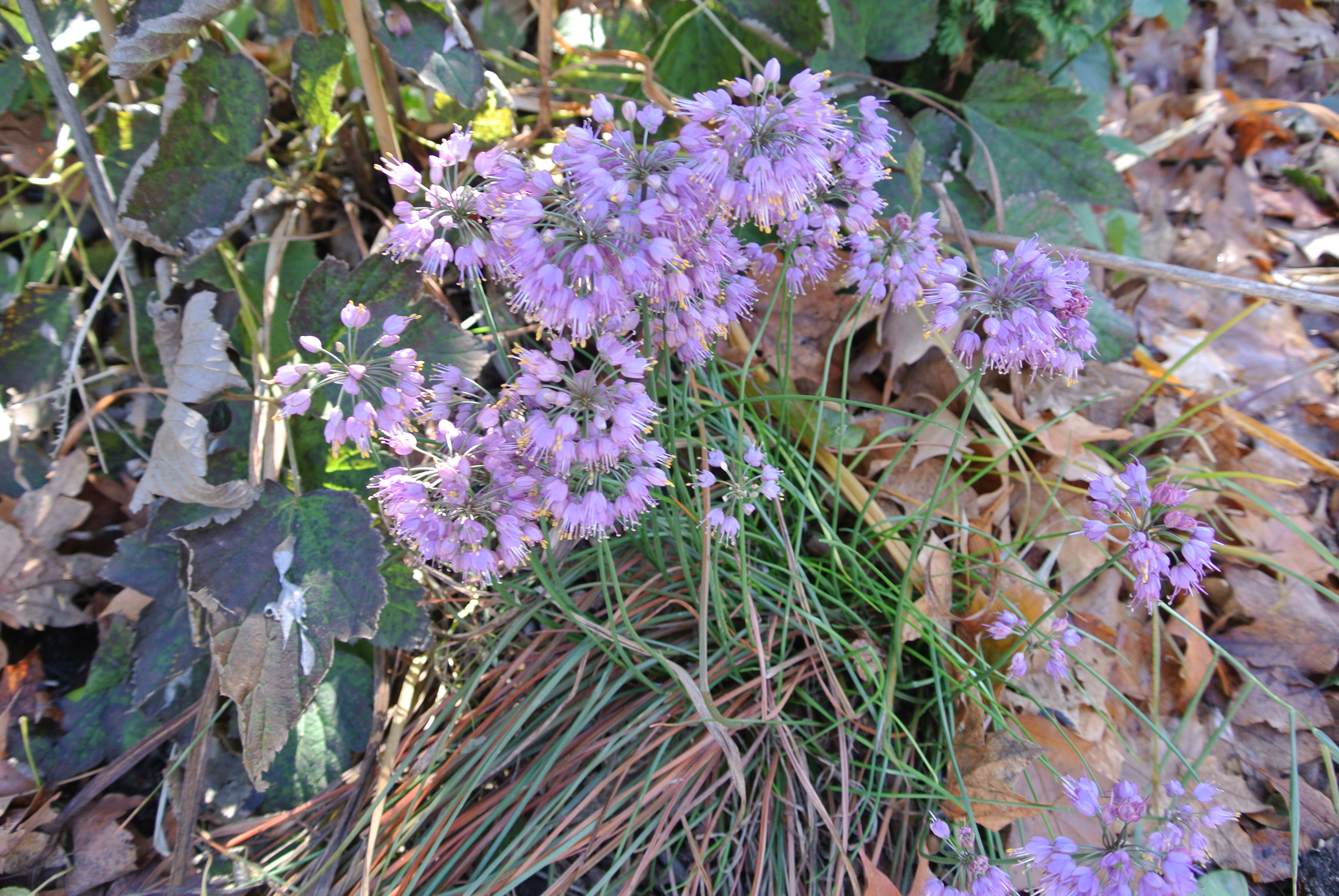
- Allium thunbergii 'Ozawa' in the garden of botanist Robert R. Kowal, Madison, Wisconsin

Scientific classification
- Kingdom: Plantae
- Clade: Tracheophytes
- Clade: Angiosperms
- Clade: Monocots
- Order: Asparagales
- Family: Amaryllidaceae
- Subfamily: Allioideae
- Genus: Allium
- Species: A. thunbergii

Binomial name
- Allium thunbergii G. Don

Synonyms
- Synonymy: Allium arenarium Thunb.; Allium bakeri var. morrisonense (Hayata) T.S.Liu & S.S.Ying; Allium bakeri var. morrisonense (Hayata) Tang S. Liu & S.S. Ying; Allium cyaneum f. stenodon (Nakai & Kitag.) Kitag.; Allium cyaneum var. stenodon (Nakai & Kitag.) Kitag.; Allium japonicum Steud.; Allium morrisonense Hayata; Allium nerinifolium Baker; Allium odorum Thunb. 1784, illegitimate homonym not L. 1767; Allium plurifoliatum var. stenodon (Nakai & Kitag.) J.M.Xu; Allium pseudocyaneum Grüning; Allium sacculiferum var. glaucum P.P.Gritz.; Allium sacculiferum var. robustum P.P.Gritz.; Allium senescens Thunb.; Allium stenodon Nakai & Kitag.; Allium triquetrum Lour.; Allium yamarakyo Honda

= Allium thunbergii =

Species of plant

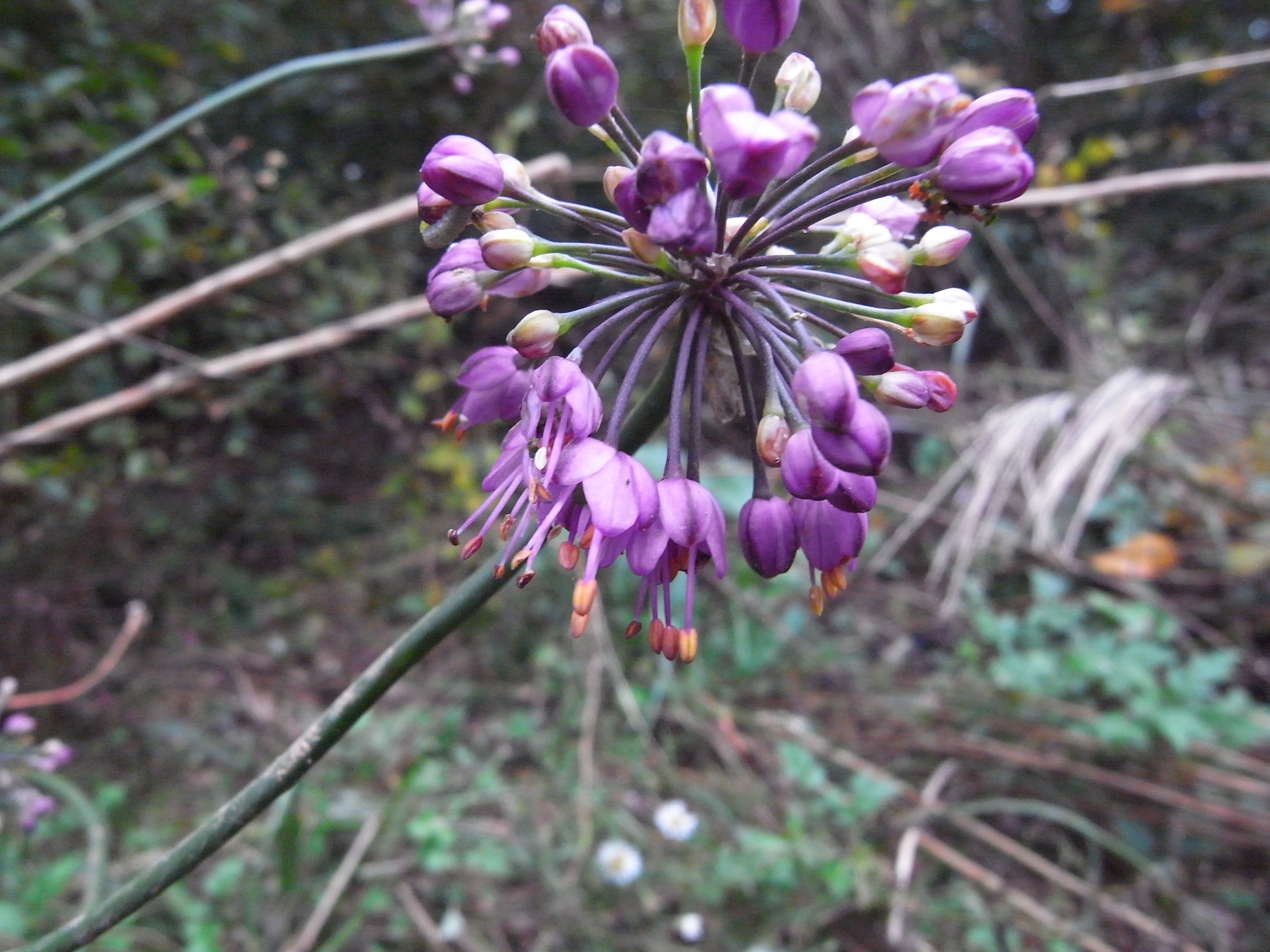

Allium thunbergii, Thunberg's chive Thunberg garlic or sanbuchu, is an East Asian species of wild onion native to Japan (incl Bonin + Ryukyu Islands), Korea, and China (incl. Taiwan). It grows at elevations up to 3000 m. The Flora of China recognizes A. tunbergii and A. stenodon as separate species, but more recent sources combine the two.

Allium thunbergii produces one or two egg-shaped bulbs up to 20 mm in diameter. Scapes are up to 50 cm tall. Leaves are longer than the scape, hollow, triangular in cross-section. Umbels are crowded with many red or purple flowers.

The specific epithet thunbergii references the Swedish botanist Carl Peter Thunberg.

This plant has gained the Royal Horticultural Society's Award of Garden Merit.

Varieties

- Allium thunbergii var. deltoides (S.O.Yu, S.Lee & W.T.Lee) H.J.Choi & B.U.Oh - Gayasan National Park in Korea
- Allium thunbergii var. teretifolium H.J.Choi & B.U.Oh - Korea
- Allium thunbergii var. thunbergii - China, Japan, Korea

== Bibliography ==
- Choi, Hyeok JAE; Oh, Byoung UN (October 2011). "A partial revision of Allium (Amaryllidaceae) in Korea and north-eastern China". Botanical Journal of the Linnean Society. 167 (2): 153–211. doi:10.1111/j.1095-8339.2011.01166.x.
