= Gayasan National Park =

National park of South Korea

Coordinates: 35°49′N 128°07′E

가야산국립공원, 伽倻山國立公園
- Gaya Mountain National Park
- IUCN category II (national park)
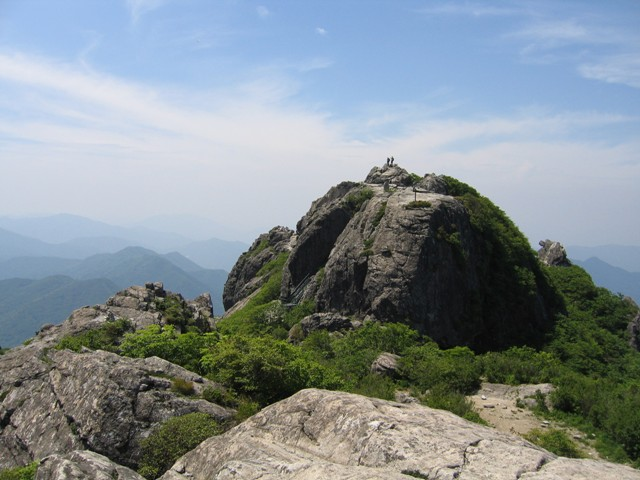
- Sanghwang peak, 2004.
- Interactive map of 가야산국립공원, 伽倻山國立公園
- Nearest city: Daegu, South Korea
- Area: 64.71 sq mi (167.6 km^{2})
- Established: 13 October 1972
- Governing body: Korea National Park Service

Korean name
- Hangul: 가야산 국립공원
- Hanja: 伽倻山 國立公園
- RR: Gayasan gungnip gongwon
- MR: Kayasan kungnip kongwŏn

Gayasan National Park, also known as Gaya Mountain National Park (Korean: 가야산국립공원), is a large national park in the eastern part of South Korea. The park is named in honor of Gayasan and became a National Park in 1972.

The park includes Haeinsa, which is one of the main temples of the Jogye Order of Korean Buddhism.

== Geography ==
The twenty-two national parks of South Korea.
Land-based parks are in red and marine parks are in blue.

Gayasan National Park covers an area of more than 160 square kilometers. The national park extends from the northern edge of South Gyeongsang Province, to the southern limit of North Gyeongsang Province. The Sobaek Mountain range runs through this area.

=== Gaya Mountain ===
The national park is named in honor of Gaya Mountain. This mountain has two major peaks: one of them is Sangwangbong Peak, for which the height is 1,430 meters, and the other slightly higher peak, Chulbulbong, is 1,433 above sea level.

== Special features ==
One significant feature of the national park is Haeinsa. This Buddhist temple includes in its grounds a standing Buddha figure carved into a vertical rock.

Another feature of the park is Yongmun Falls and Hongnyudong Valley. 380 different species of plant have been identified as growing there, as well as 100 species of birds, and other wild animals.

== History ==
The area was declared Scenic Site No. 5 by the Korean government in 1966, and it became an official National Park in 1972.

The remoteness of the area has played a role in protecting it from destruction in the past, specifically during the Japanese invasions of 1592-98, when much of the country was razed.

Since that time, legend says that the area around Gaya Mountains is free from the Three Disasters: fire, floods and wind.

== Gallery ==
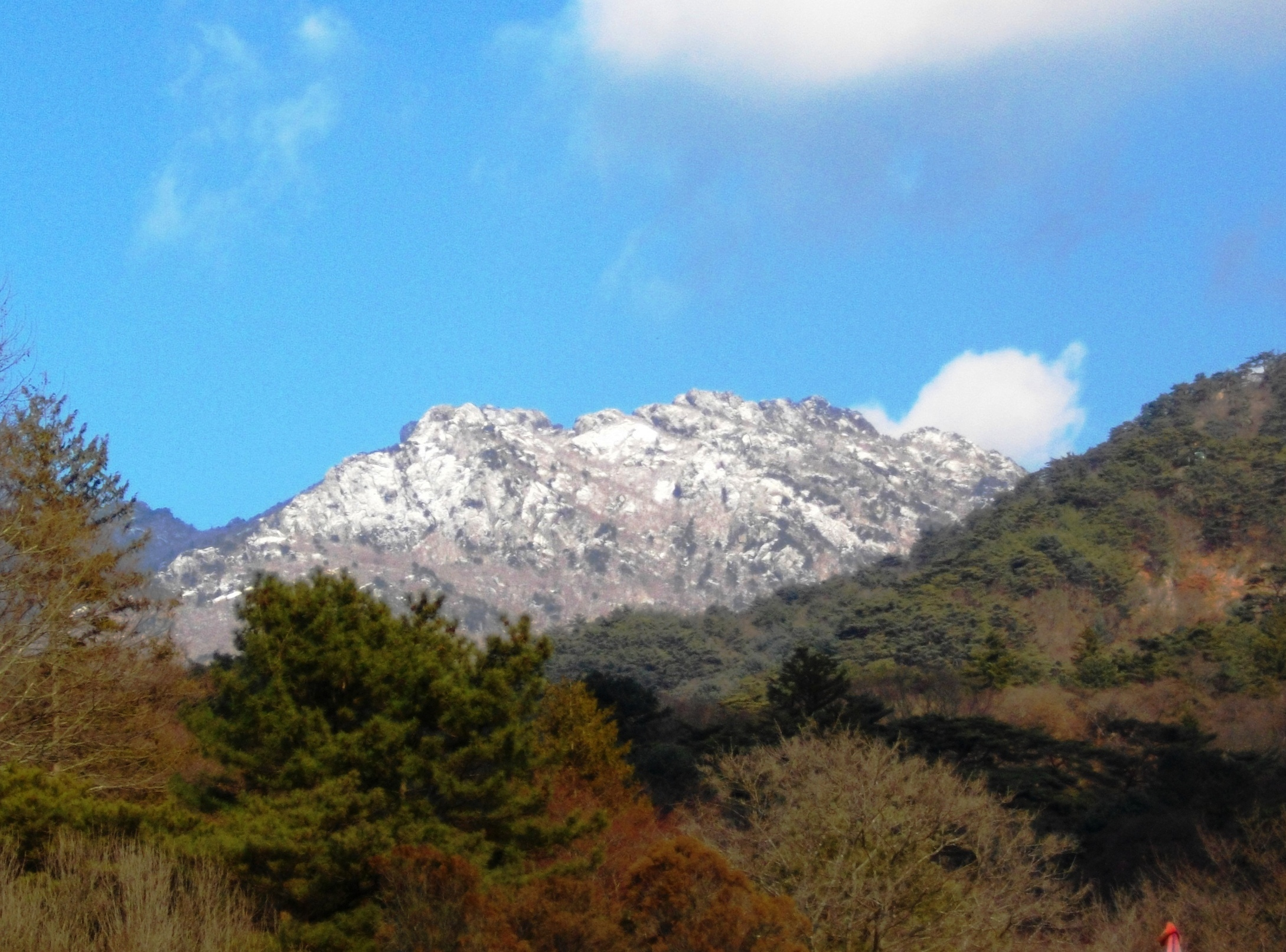
Gayasan from Haeinsa temple

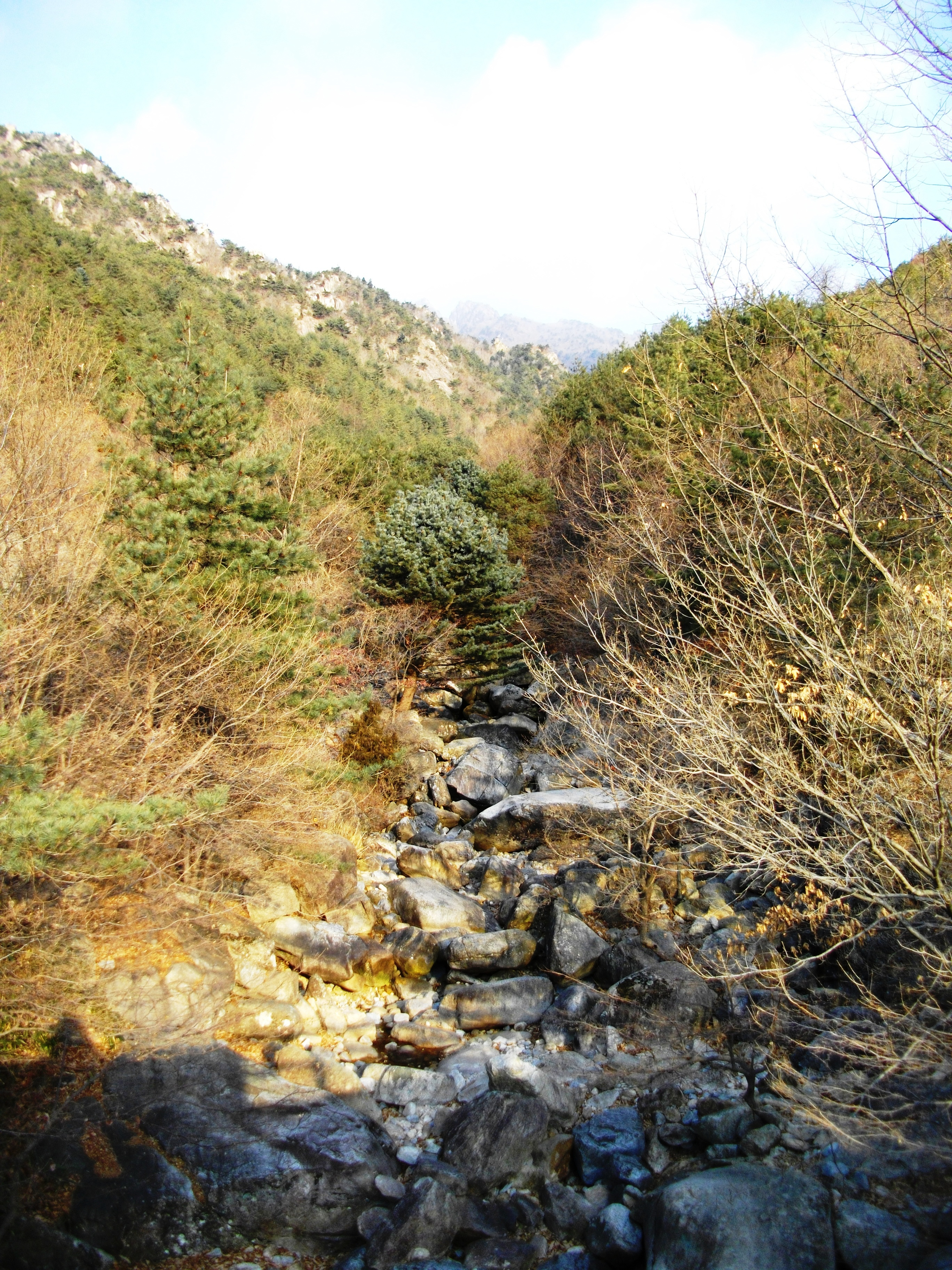
Gayasan from Southeast

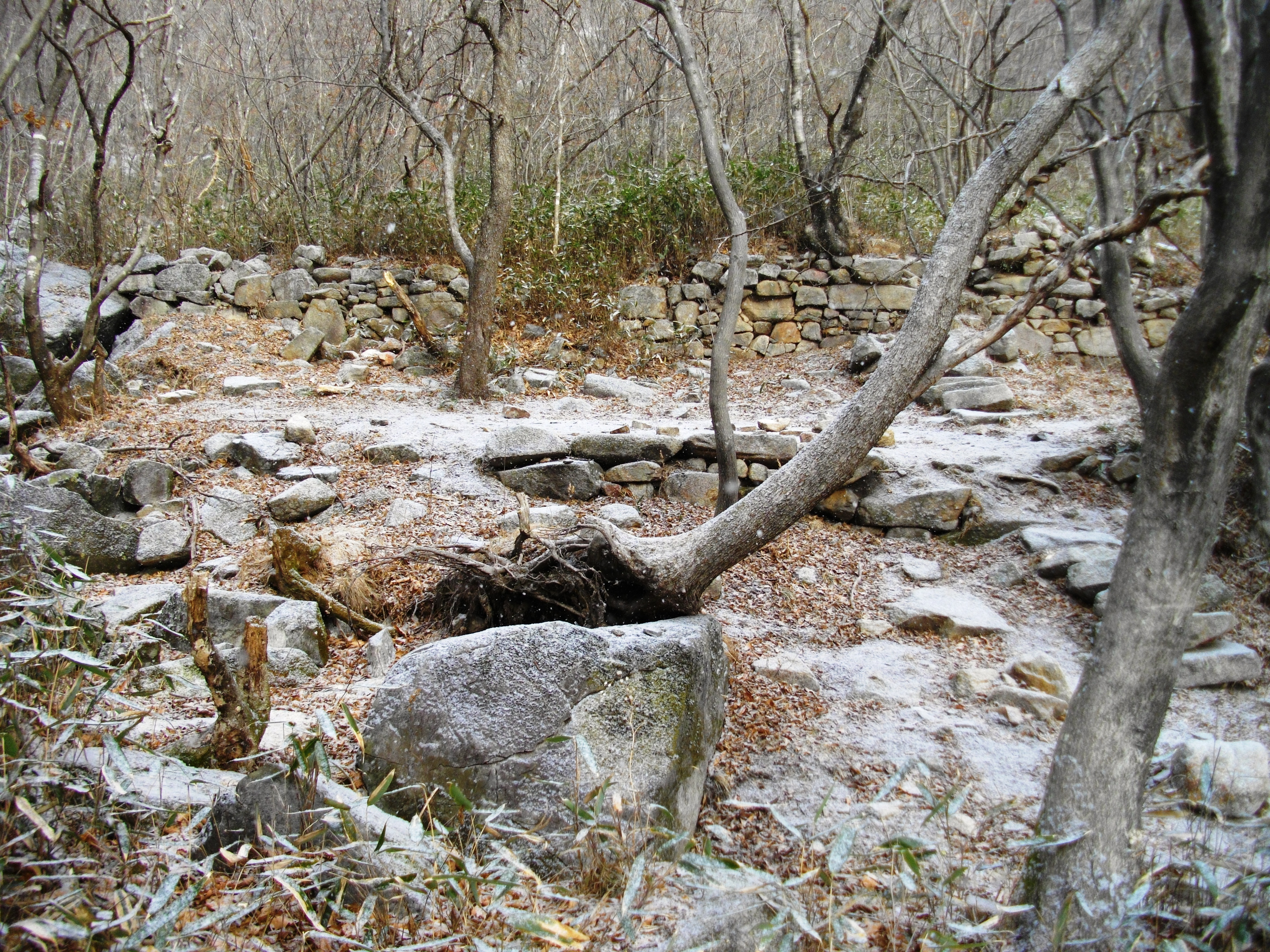
Ruins of Baekumam temple in Gayasan

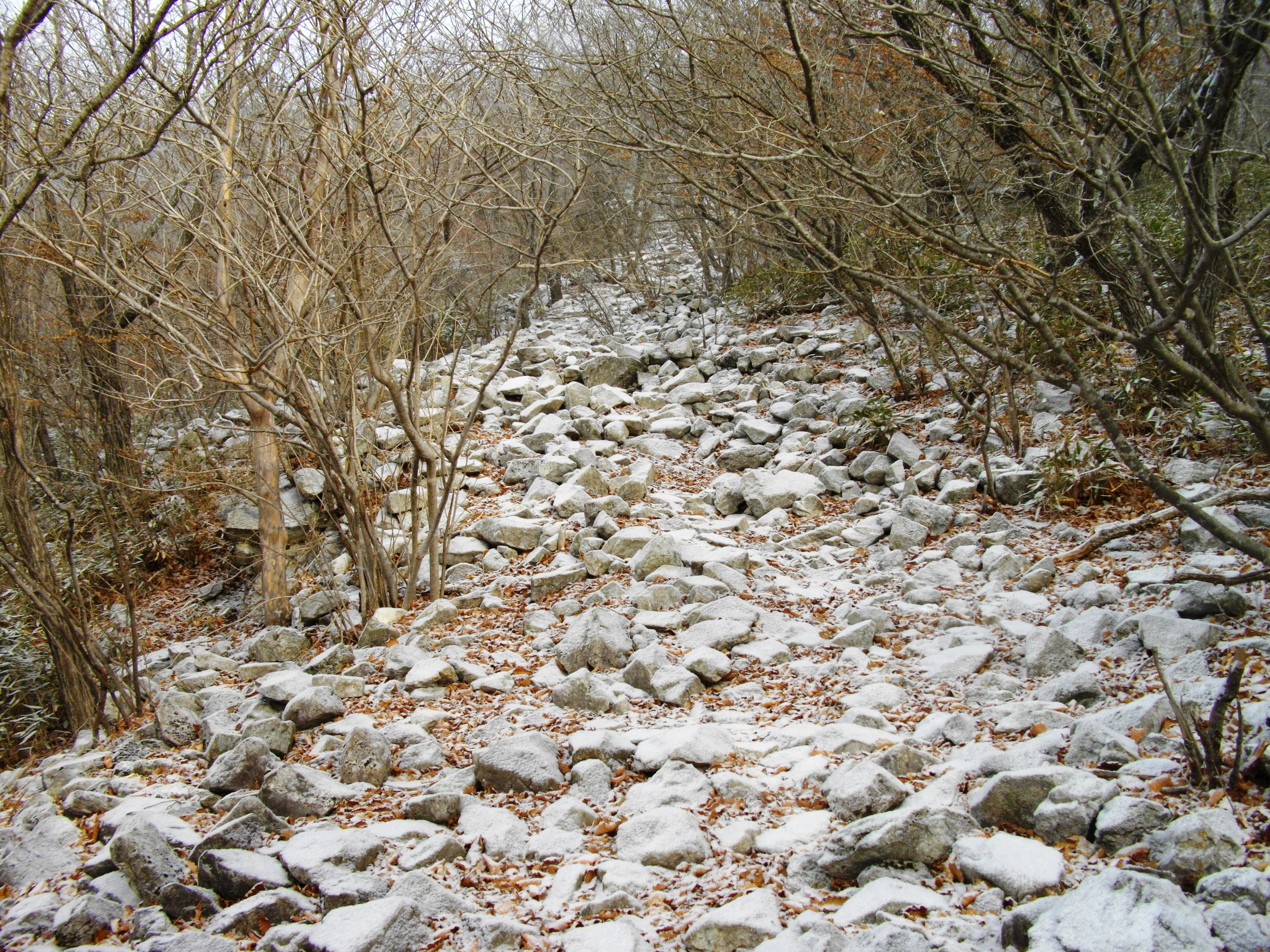
Gayasan Castle in Gayasan

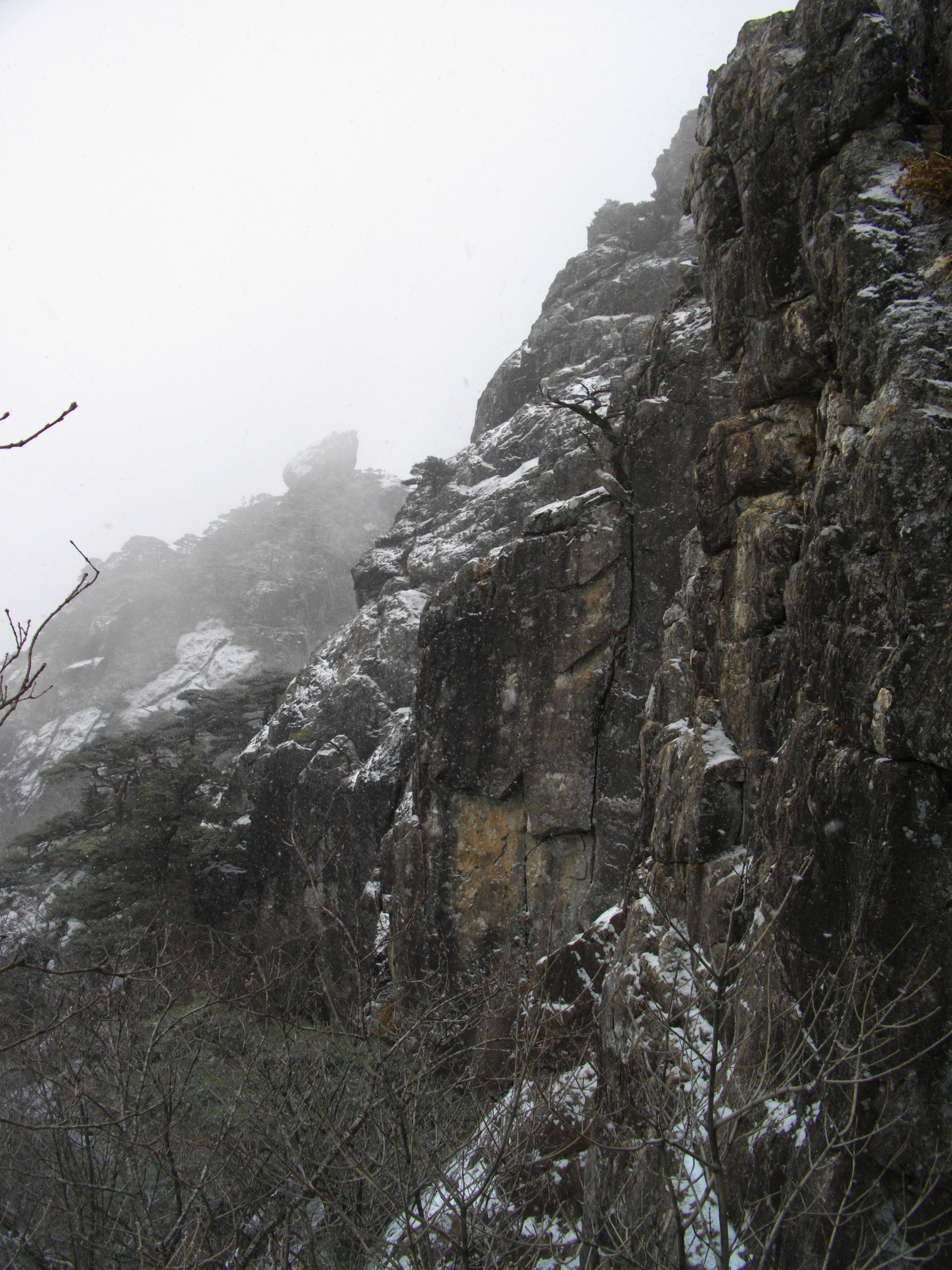
Stone walls near Chilbulbong Peak in Gayasan (1)

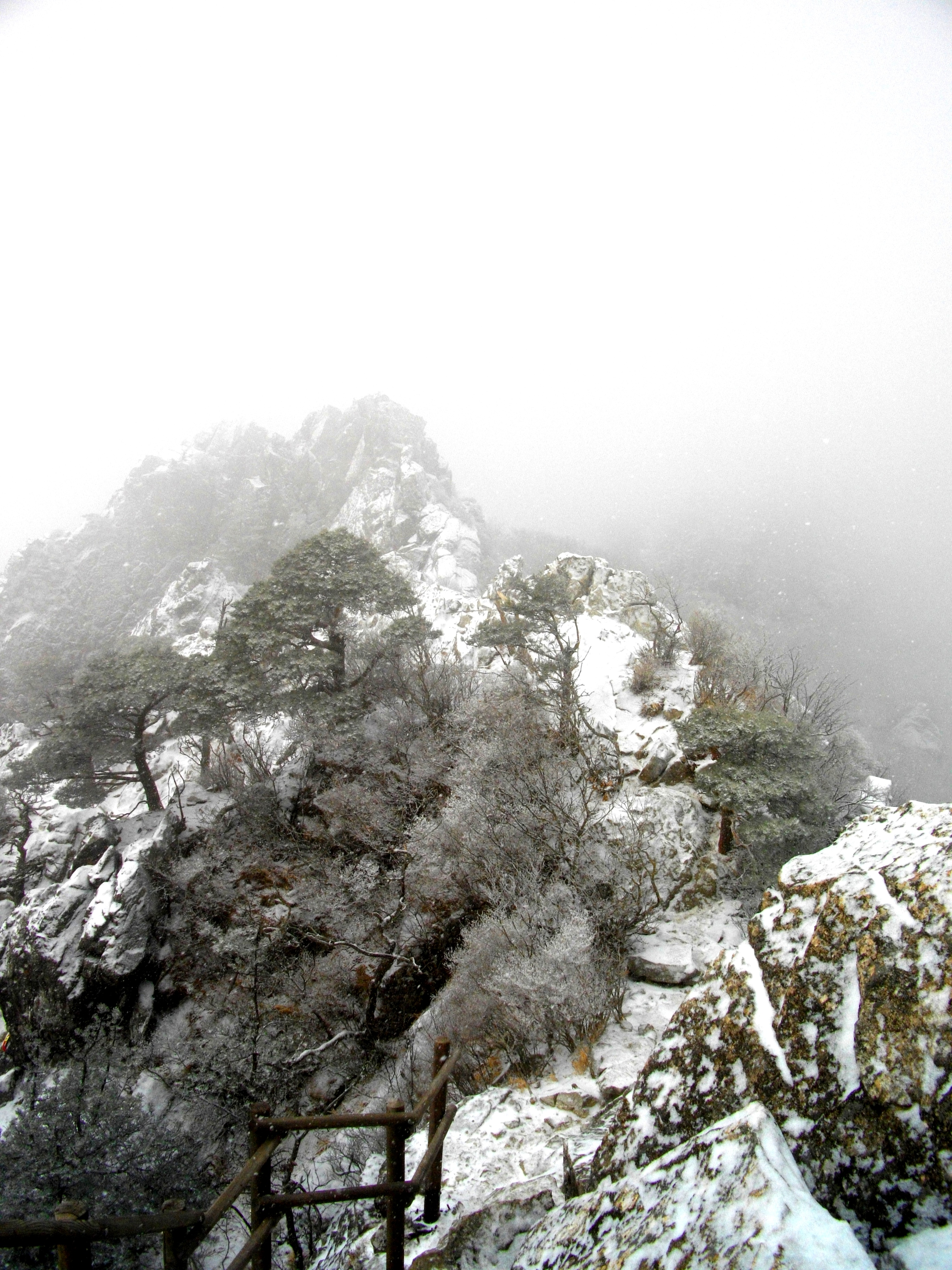
Stone walls near Chilbulbong Peak in Gayasan (2)

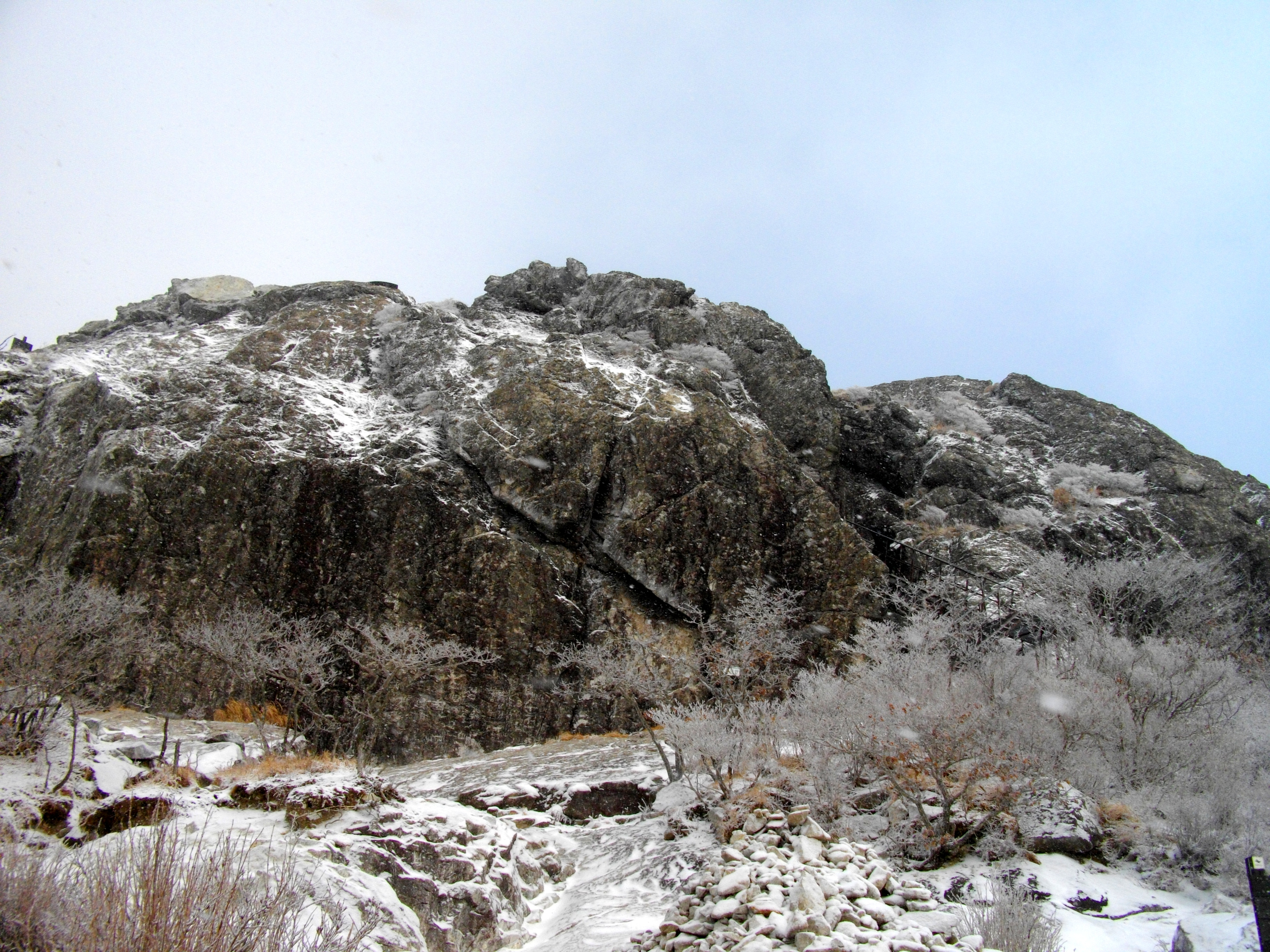
Sangwangbong Peak of Gayasan

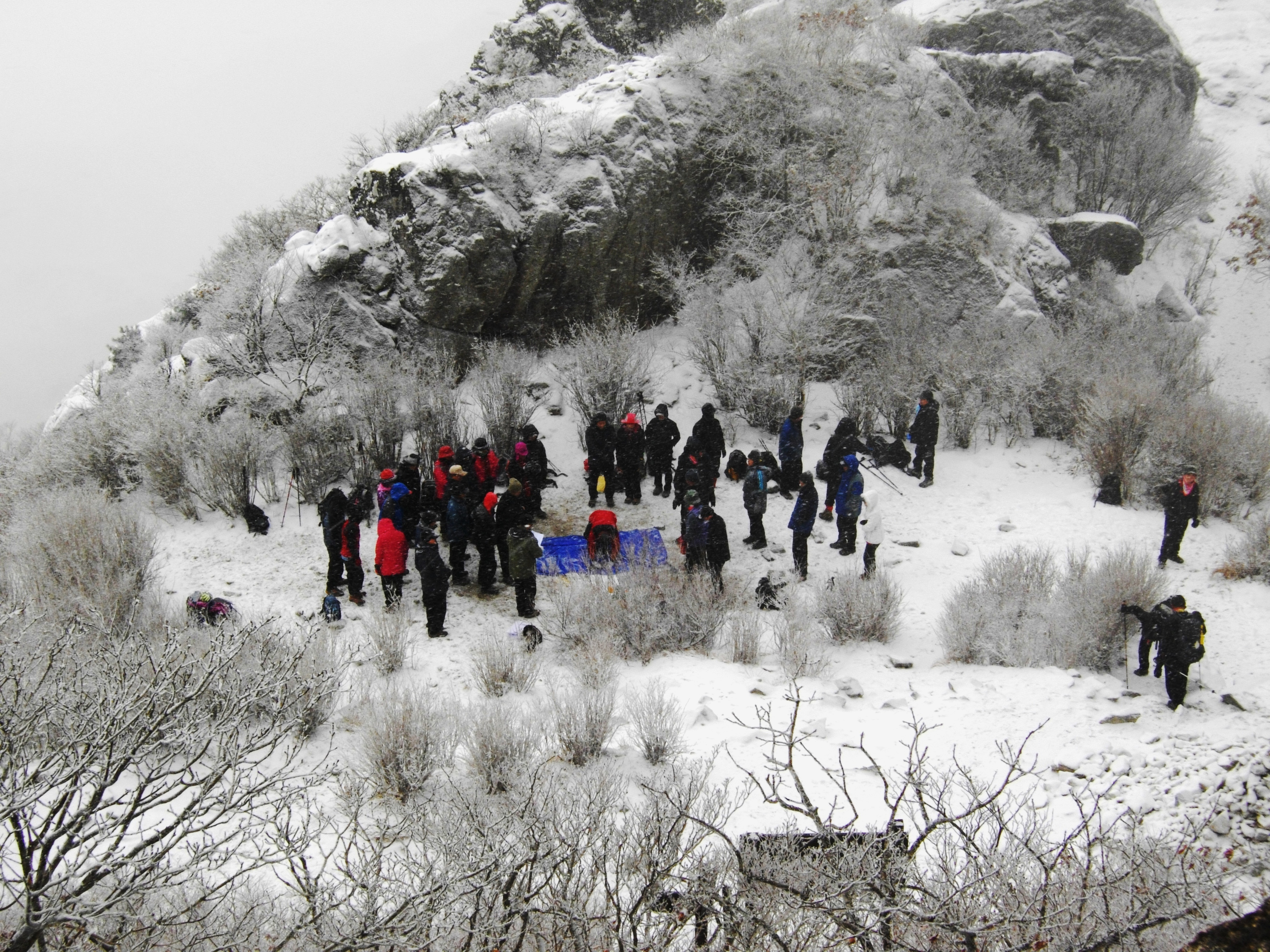
Rituals of Buddhism in Gayasan

== Recreation ==
Gayasan National Park has multiple hiking trails that run through the mountainous park. The most trafficked trail begins in Heinsa Temple and contains a guard station that provides park information for visitors.

There are three designated campgrounds within the borders of the park for day use and overnight tent camping.
