= Yong =

Yong may refer to:

- Yong (Chinese: 永), Chinese character for "permanence", unique in that the character contains eight strokes common to Chinese characters; see Eight Principles of Yong
  - Yongzhou (永州), a prefecture-level city of Hunan province
  - Yongcheng (永城), a county-level city of Henan province
- Yong (Chinese: 雍) or Yongcheng, capital of Qin (state), located in modern Fengxiang County, founded in 677 BC and moved to Yueyang (櫟陽) in 383 BC
  - The region of Yongzhou (雍州) in ancient China
- Yong (surname) (雍), a Chinese surname
- Yong (邕) a former name of Nanning and the surrounding region
  - Yong River (Guangxi) (邕江) in Zhuang Autonomous Region, China
- Yong River (甬江) in Zhejiang Province, China
- Yong (Chinese: 用), Chinese character for "use" or "function"; in Neo-Confucianism, often associated with Ti ("substance" or "body"); see Essence-Function
- Yong, a variant of Yang (surname) (楊/杨)
- Yong (Chinese name) (勇)
- Yong (Korean name)
- Korean dragon (yong)
- Yong language, a Southwestern Tai language of Thailand
- Yong, Ghana, a community in Tamale Metropolitan District in the Northern Region of Ghana
- Yong Yong, another name for the Chinese bootleg game company Makon Soft

== People ==
- Yong (musician) (born 2000), Norwegian producer, singer, songwriter & YouTuber.
- Yong Poovorawan (born 1950), Thai virologist.
- Taeyong (born 1995), South Korean rapper, singer, and songwriter.

== See also ==
- Jong (disambiguation)
- Yung (disambiguation)
