= Young =

Young may refer to:

- Offspring, the product of reproduction of a new organism produced by one or more parents
- Youth, the time of life when one's age is low, often meaning the time between childhood and adulthood

== Music ==
- Young (band), Canadian rock band, active in the 1970s
- The Young, an American rock band
- Young, an EP by Charlotte Lawrence, 2018

=== Songs ===
- "Young" (Baekhyun and Loco song), 2018
- "Young" (The Chainsmokers song), 2017
- "Young" (Hollywood Undead song), 2009
- "Young" (Kenny Chesney song), 2002
- "Young" (Place on Earth song), 2018
- "Young" (Tulisa song), 2012
- "Young", by Ella Henderson, 2019
- "Young", by Lil Wayne from Dedication 6, 2017
- "Young", by Nickel Creek from This Side, 2002
- "Young", by Sam Smith from Love Goes, 2020
- "Young", by Silkworm from Italian Platinum, 2002
- "Young", by Vacations (band), 2016
- "Young", by Vallis Alps, 2015
- "Young", by Pixey, 2016

== People ==
=== Surname ===
- Young (surname)

=== Given name ===
- Young (Korean name), Korean given name
- Young Boozer (born 1948), American banker and Alabama State Treasurer
- Young Moraes (born 2002), Brazilian football goalkeeper
- Young Tonumaipea (born 1992), Samoan-Australian rugby league footballer
- Young Vivian (born 1935), Niuean politician who has twice been the premier of Niue

=== Nickname ===
- Young Aaron (Barney Aaron), English-born American lightweight, Hall of Fame
- Young Murphy (Jack Bernstein), American world champion junior lightweight boxer
- Young Perez (Victor Perez), Tunisian world champion flyweight boxer
- Osman the Young, Ottoman sultan

== Places ==
=== Australia ===
- Young, New South Wales, Australia, a town
- Young County, New South Wales
- Young Shire, New South Wales
- Electoral district of Young, New South Wales
- Young River (Western Australia)

=== United States ===
- Young, Arizona, an unincorporated community
- Young, Indiana, an unincorporated town
- Young County, Texas
- Young, West Virginia, an unincorporated community
- Young Township (disambiguation)
- Young State Park, Michigan
- Young Conservation Area, Missouri
- Young Lake, a lake in Herkimer County, New York
- Young Park (Las Cruces, New Mexico)

=== Elsewhere ===
- Young, Saskatchewan, Canada, a village
- Young, Uruguay, a city
- Young River (New Zealand)
- Young Point (Antarctica)
- Young Island (disambiguation), various
- Young (crater), on the Moon
- Young Sound, Greenland

== Other uses ==
- USS Young, the name of more than one United States Navy ship
- Young baronets, five baronetcies, four of which are extant
- Young (mango), a named mango cultivar that originated in south Florida
- Young (wine)
- Young Broadcasting, a defunct American broadcasting company
- Young's, a British pub chain

== See also ==
- Forever Young (disambiguation)
- List of people known as the Young
- Jung (disambiguation)
- Justice Young (disambiguation)
- Youngs (disambiguation)
- Yung (disambiguation)
