= Jangah =

Jangah or Jang Gah (Persian: جنگاه) may refer to:

- Jangah, Kerman
- Jang Gah, Khuzestan
- Jangah, North Khorasan
- Jangah, Razavi Khorasan
