= Junga =

Junga may refer to:

- Junga, Himachal Pradesh, a village and tehsil in India
- Junga (film), an Indian film
- Jung-a, a Korean name (includes a list of people with the name)
- Heinz Junga (born 1943), German former swimmer

== See also ==
- Janga (disambiguation)
- Jung (disambiguation)
- Yunga (disambiguation)
