= Jang =

Jang may refer to:

- Jang (food), sauce in Korean cuisine
- Jang (Korean surname), a common Korean family name
- Jang (Marshall Islands), part of Maloelap Atoll, in the Marshall Islands
- Jang, Nepal, a village development committee in the Rapti Zone of western Nepal
- Jang, the Tibetan name for the Naxi people living in the region of Lijiang, Yunnan
- Jang Group of Newspapers, a Pakistani newspaper publishing company
  - Daily Jang, an Urdu-language newspaper published by the Jang Group
- Jang Town, a town in Tawang, Arunachal Pradesh, India.
- A rank bestowed by the Nizam of Hyderabad to ennobled Muslim retainers - see Khan (title)

== See also ==
- Jung (disambiguation)
- Janga (disambiguation)
- Jangam (disambiguation)
- Dschang, a city in Cameroon
