= Buddha-nature =

Buddhist philosophical concept

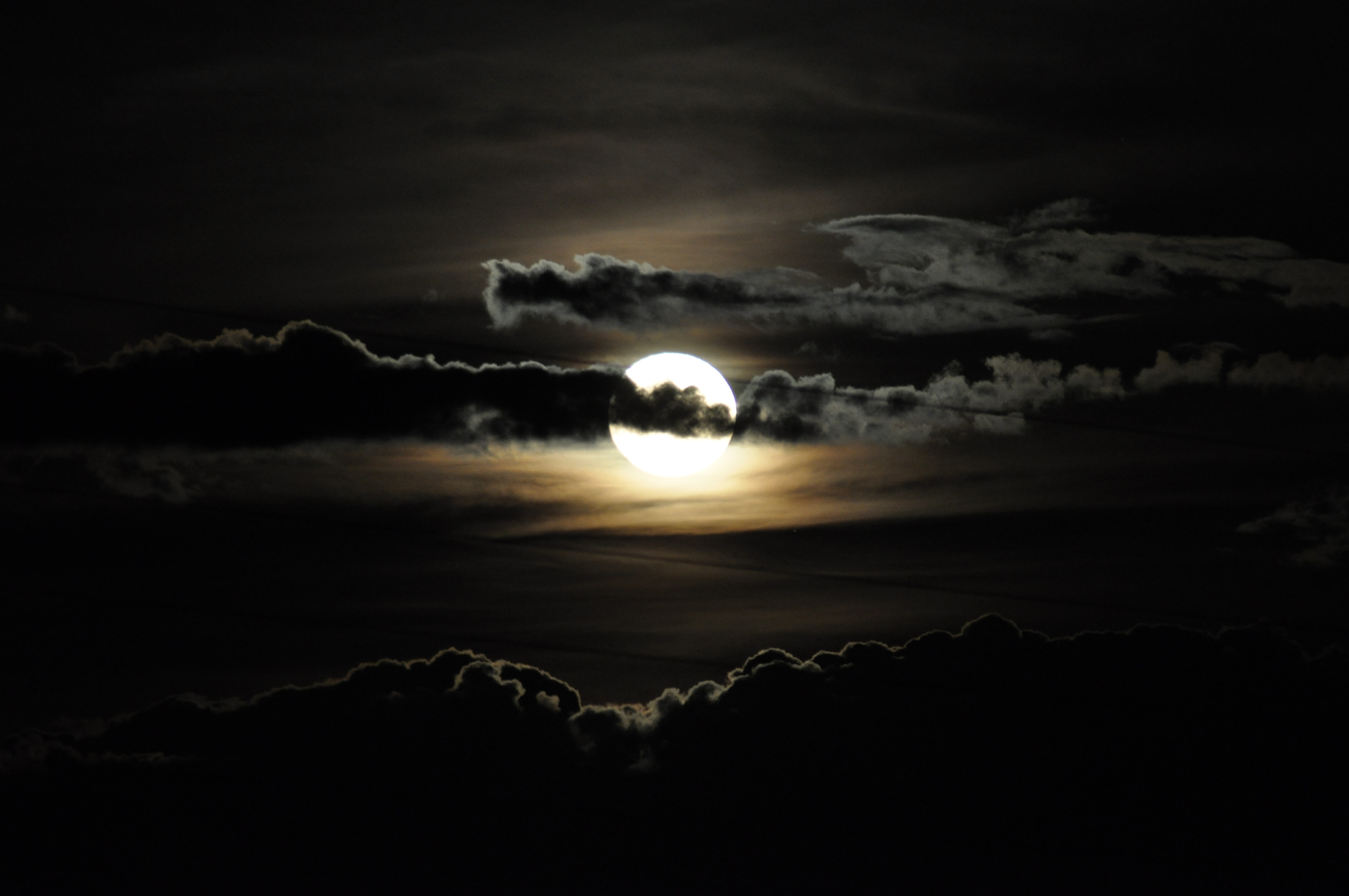
The moon and its light hidden by the clouds is a metaphor for the luminous mind of Buddha-nature, which is always shining but can be hidden or covered over by the afflictions. (Note: The image of the moon as the Buddha-nature can be seen in the Platform Sutra. Dogen treats this metaphor in Shobogenzo 43, Tsuki ("On the Moon as One's Excellent Nature"). Compare also: A Zen master, Ryokan, lived a life of simplicity in his hut near the mountains. When he was away one night, a thief broke in only to find nothing worth stealing. Just then, Ryokan returned. "You have travelled far to visit me," he told the burglar. "I cannot let you return empty handed. Here are my clothes, please accept them as my gift." The baffled thief took the clothes and vanished. Naked now, the master gazed at the moon. "Poor man," he sighed, "How I wish I could give him this glorious moon." (Zen Story: Steal the Moon); "Clear mind is like the full moon in the sky. Sometimes clouds come and cover it, but the moon is always behind them. Clouds go away, then the moon shines brightly. So don't worry about clear mind: it is always there. When thinking comes, behind it is clear mind. When thinking goes, there is only clear mind. Thinking comes and goes, comes and goes. You must not be attached to the coming or the going." (Seung Sahn, Clear Mind Is Like The Full Moon); According to McRae (2003, pp. 61–65), in the famous story of the verse-contest in the Platform Sutra, the two verses are actually complementary: The body is the bodhi tree. The mind is like a bright mirror's stand. At all times we must strive to polish it and must not let dust collect. Bodhi originally has no tree. The mirror has no stand. The Buddha-nature is always clear and pure. Where is there room for dust? According to McRae, "T]he verse attributed to Shenxiu [does refer] to a constant practice of cleaning the mirror [...] Huineng's verse(s) apply the rhetoric of emptiness to undercut the substantiality of the terms of that formulation. However, the basic meaning of the first proposition still remains." See also Joko Beck, Everyday Zen (2008), p.19-20 and p.63 on the mirror verses: Now while the verse of the Sixth Patriarch is the true understanding, the paradox for us is that we have to practice with the verse that was not accepted: we do have to polish the mirror; we do have to be aware of our thoughts and actions; we do have to be aware of our false reactions to life.")

In Buddhist philosophy and soteriology, Buddha-nature (Chinese: fóxìng 佛性, Japanese: busshō 佛性, Vietnamese: Phật tính, Sanskrit: buddhatā, buddha-svabhāva or tathāgatagarbha तथागतगर्भ) is the innate potential for all sentient beings to become a Buddha or the fact that all sentient beings already have a pure Buddha-essence within themselves. "Buddha-nature" is the common English translation for several related Mahāyāna Buddhist terms, most notably tathāgatagarbha (तथागतगर्भ) and buddhadhātu, but also sugatagarbha, and buddhagarbha. Tathāgatagarbha can mean "the womb" or "embryo" (garbha) of the "thus-gone one" (tathāgata), (Note: Enlightened one, a/the Buddha) and can also mean "containing a tathāgata". Buddhadhātu can mean "buddha-element", "buddha-realm", or "buddha-substrate". (Note: Kevin Trainor: "a sacred nature that is the basis for [beings'] becoming buddhas.")

Buddha-nature has a wide range of (sometimes conflicting) meanings in Indian Buddhism and later in East Asian and Tibetan Buddhist literature. Broadly speaking, it refers to the belief that the luminous mind, "the natural and true state of the mind", which is pure (visuddhi) mind undefiled by afflictions, is inherently present in every sentient being, and is eternal and unchanging. It will shine forth when it is cleansed of the defilements, that is, when the nature of mind is recognized for what it is.

The Mahāyāna Mahāparinirvāṇa Sūtra (2nd century CE), which was very influential in the Chinese reception of these teachings, linked the concept of tathāgatagārbha with the buddhadhātu. The term buddhadhātu originally referred to the relics of Gautama Buddha. In the Mahāyāna Mahāparinirvāṇa Sūtra, it came to be used in place of the concept of tathāgatagārbha, reshaping the worship of physical relics of the historical Buddha into worship of the inner Buddha as a principle of salvation.

The primordial or undefiled mind, the tathāgatagārbha, is also often equated with the Buddhist philosophical concept of emptiness (śūnyatā, a Mādhyamaka concept); with the storehouse-consciousness (ālāyavijñāna, a Yogācāra concept); and with the interpenetration of all dharmas (in East Asian traditions like Huayan). The belief in Buddha-nature is central to East Asian Buddhism, which relies on key Buddha-nature sources like the Mahāyāna Mahāparinirvāṇa Sūtra. In Tibetan Buddhism, the concept of Buddha-nature is equally important and often studied through the key Indian treatise on Buddha-nature, the Ratnagotravibhāga (3rd–5th century CE).

== Etymology ==
=== Tathāgatagarbha ===
The term tathāgatagarbha may mean "embryonic tathāgata", "womb of the tathāgata", or "containing a tathagata". Various meanings may all be brought into mind when the term tathagatagarbha is being used.

==== Compound ====
The Sanskrit term tathāgatagarbha is a compound of two terms, tathāgata and garbha:

- tathāgata means "the one thus gone", referring to the Buddha. It is composed of "tathā" and "āgata", "thus come", or "tathā" and "gata", "thus gone". The term refers to a Buddha, who has "thus gone" from samsara into nirvana, and "thus come" from nirvana into samsara to work for the salvation of all sentient beings.
- garbha, "womb", "embryo", "center", "essence". (Note: According to Wayman & Wayman, the term garbha takes on various meanings, depending on its context. They translate a passage from the Sri-mala-sutra as follows: "Lord, this Tathagatagarbha is the Illustrious Dharmadhatu-womb, neither self nor sentient being, nor soul, nor personality. Is the dharmakaya-embryo, not the domain of beings who fall into the belief in a real personality. Is the supramundane dharma-center, not the domain of beings who adhere to wayward views. Is the intrinsically pure dharma-center, not the domain of beings who deviate from voidness".)

==== Asian translations ====
The Chinese translated the term tathāgatagarbha as rúláizàng (如来藏), or "Tathāgata's (rúlái) storehouse" (zàng). According to Brown, "storehouse" may indicate both "that which enfolds or contains something", or "that which is itself enfolded, hidden or contained by another." The Tibetan translation is de bzhin gshegs pa'i snying po, which cannot be translated as "womb" (mngal or lhums), but as "embryonic essence", "kernel" or "heart". The term "heart" was also used by Mongolian translators.

The Tibetan scholar Go Lotsawa outlined four meanings of the term Tathāgatagarbha as used by Indian Buddhist scholars generally: (1) As an emptiness that is a nonimplicative negation, (2) the luminous nature of the mind, (3) alaya-vijñana (store-consciousness), (4) all bodhisattvas and sentient beings.

==== Western translations ====
The term tathagatagarbha first appears in the Tathāgatagarbha sūtras, which date to the 2nd and third centuries CE. It is translated and interpreted in various ways by western translators and scholars:

- According to Sally King, the term tathāgatagarbha may be understood in two ways:
1. "embryonic tathāgata", the incipient Buddha, the cause of the Tathāgata,
2. "womb of the tathāgata", the fruit of Tathāgata.

According to King, the Chinese rúláizàng was taken in its meaning as "womb" or "fruit".

- Wayman & Hideko also point out that the Chinese regularly takes garbha as "womb", but prefer to use the term "embryo".
- According to Brown, following Wayman & Hideko, "embryo" is the best fitting translation, since it preserves "the dynamic, self-transformative nature of the tathagatagarbha."
- According to Zimmermann, garbha may also mean the interior or center of something, and its essence or central part. As a tatpuruṣa (Note: In Sanskrit grammar a tatpuruṣa (तत्पुरुष) compound is a dependent determinative compound, i.e. a compound XY meaning a type of Y which is related to X in a way corresponding to one of the grammatical cases of X.) it may refer to a person being a "womb" for or "container" of the tathagata. As a bahuvrihi (Note: A bahuvrihi compound (from Sanskrit बहुव्रीहि, bahuvrīhi, literally meaning "much rice" but denoting a rich man) is a type of compound that denotes a referent by specifying a certain characteristic or quality the referent possesses.) it may refer to a person as having an embryonic tathagata inside. In both cases, this embryonic tathagata still has to be developed. Zimmermann concludes that tathagatagarbha is a bahuvrihi, meaning "containing a tathagata", (Note: In the Maraparinirvana Sutra the term tathagatagarbha replaces the term buddhadhatu, which originally referred to relics. Worship of the physical relics of the Buddha was reshaped into worship of the inner Buddha.) but notes the variety of meanings of garbha, such as "containing", "born from", "embryo", "(embracing/concealing) womb", "calyx", "child", "member of a clan", "core", which may all be brought into mind when the term tathagatagarbha is being used.
- In addition to Zimmerman's statement that tathagatagarbha most natural means "containing a Tathagata," Paul Williams notes that garbha also means "womb/matrix" and "seed/embryo," and "the innermost part of something." The term tathagatagarbha can thus also imply "that sentient beings have a tathāgata within them in seed or embryo, that sentient beings are the wombs or matrices of the tathāgata, or that they have a tathāgata as their essence, core, or essential inner nature." According to Williams, the term tathāgatagarbha "may also have been intended simply to answer the question how it is possible that all sentient beings can attain the state of a Buddha.

=== Buddhadhātu ===
The term "buddha-nature" (traditional Chinese: 佛性; ; pinyin: fóxìng, Japanese: busshō) is closely related in meaning to the term tathāgatagarbha, but is not an exact translation of this term. (Note: For the various equivalents of the Sanskrit term "tathāgatagarbha" in other languages (Chinese, Japanese, Vietnamese), see Glossary of Buddhism, "tathagatagarbha") It refers to what is essential in the human being.

The corresponding Sanskrit term is buddhadhātu. It has two meanings, namely the nature of the Buddha, equivalent to the term dharmakāya, and the cause of the Buddha. The link between the cause and the result is the nature (dhātu, see also Svabhava, Mahābhūta, and Eighteen dhātus) which is common to both, namely the dharmadhātu.

Matsumoto Shirō also points out that "buddha-nature" translates the Sanskrit-term buddhadhātu, a "place to put something," a "foundation," a "locus." According to Shirō, it does not mean "original nature" or "essence," nor does it mean the "possibility of the attainment of Buddhahood," "the original nature of the Buddha," or "the essence of the Buddha."

In the Vajrayana, the term for buddha-nature is sugatagarbha.

== Indian Sutra sources ==
=== Historical precursors ===
According to Alex Wayman, the idea of the tathāgatagarbha is grounded on sayings by the Buddha that there is something called the luminous mind (prabhasvaracitta), "which is only adventitiously covered over by defilements (agantuka klesha)." The luminous mind is mentioned in a passage from the Anguttara Nikaya (which has various parallels) which states that the mind is luminous but "is defiled by incoming defilements." (Note: Harvey mentions AN 1.10: "Monks, this mind (citta) is brightly shining (pabhassara), but it is defiled by defilements which arrive". AN 1.49–52 gives a similar statement) The Mahāsāṃghika school coupled this idea with the idea of the "root consciousness" (mulavijñana) which serves as the basic layer of the mind and which is held to have a self-nature (cittasvabhāva) which is pure (visuddhi) and undefiled. In some of the tathagatagarbha-sutras a consciousness which is naturally pure (prakṛti-pariśuddha) is regarded to be the seed from which Buddhahood grows. Wayman thus argues that the pure luminous mind doctrine formed the basis for the classic buddha-nature doctrine.

Karl Brunnhölzl writes that the first probable mention of the term tathāgatagarbha is in the Ekottarika Agama (though here it is used in a different way than in later texts). The passage states:

If someone devotes himself to the Ekottarikagama, Then he has the tathagatagarbha. Even if his body cannot exhaust defilements in this life, In his next life he will attain supreme wisdom.

This tathāgatagarbha idea was the result of an interplay between various strands of Buddhist thought, on the nature of human consciousness and the means of awakening. Gregory sees this doctrine as implying that enlightenment is the natural state of the mind.

==== Avatamsaka and Lotus Sutras ====
According to Wayman, the teachings of the Avataṃsaka Sūtra (1st–3rd century CE), which say that the Buddha's knowledge is all pervasive and is present in all sentient beings were also an important step in the development of buddha-nature thought. The Avataṃsaka Sūtra does not mention the term tathāgatagarbha, but the idea of "a universal penetration of sentient beings by the wisdom of the Buddha (buddhajñāna)," is seen by some scholars as complementary to the tathāgatagarbha concept.

The Lotus Sutra, written between 100 BCE and 200 CE, also does not use the term tathāgatagarbha, but Japanese scholars suggest that a similar idea is nevertheless expressed or implied in the text. The tenth chapter emphasizes that all living beings can become a Buddha. The twelfth chapter of the Lotus Sutra details that the potential to become enlightened is universal among all people, even the historical Devadatta has the potential to become a buddha. East Asian commentaries saw these teachings as indicating that the Lotus sutra was also drawing on the concept of the universality of buddha-nature. The sutra shares other themes and ideas with the later tathāgatagarbha sūtras and thus several scholars theorize that it was an influence on these texts.

=== Tathāgatagarbha Sūtra and Nirvana Sūtra ===
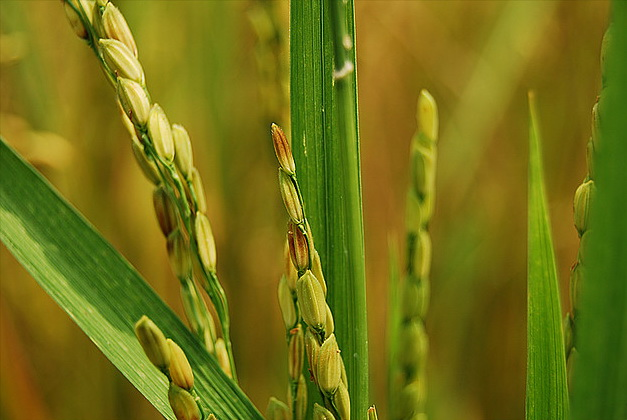
The Tathāgatagarbha Sūtra states that the tathāgatagarbha is like the grain of rice contained inside of the husk of the rice plant

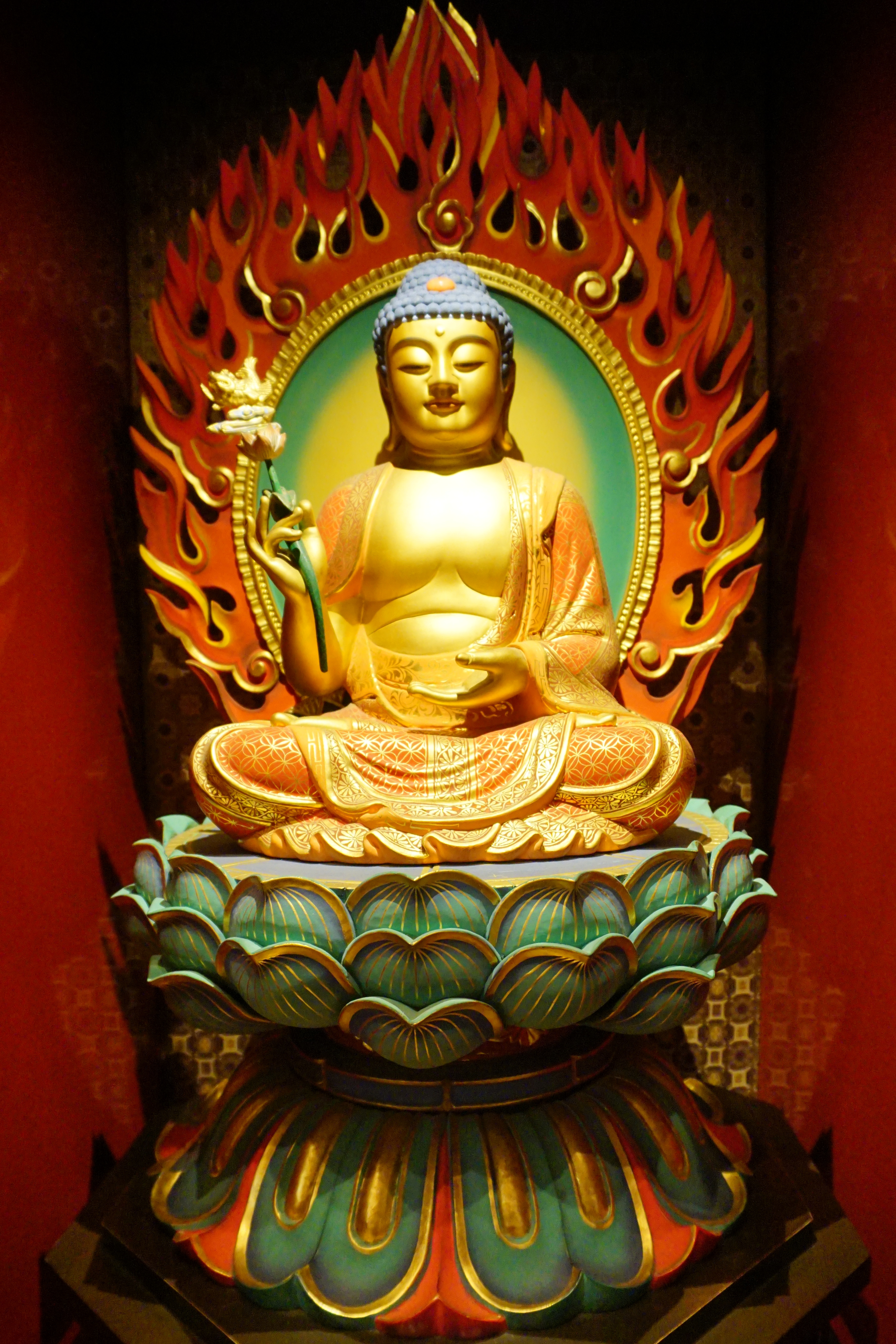
The Tathāgatagarbha Sūtra uses the image of a Buddha within a lotus flower as a metaphor for the tathāgatagarbha

According to Zimmerman, the Tathāgatagarbha Sūtra (200–250 CE) is the earliest buddha-nature text. Zimmerman argues that "the term tathāgatagarbha itself seems to have been coined in this very sutra." The Tathāgatagarbha Sūtra states that all beings already have perfect Buddha body (*tathāgatatva, *buddhatva, *tathāgatakāya) within themselves, but do not recognize it because it is covered over by afflictions.

The Tathāgatagarbha Sūtra uses nine similes to illustrate the concept:

This [tathāgatagarbha] abides within the shroud of the afflictions, as should be understood through [the following nine] examples: Just like a buddha in a decaying lotus, honey amidst bees, a grain in its husk, gold in filth, a treasure underground, a shoot and so on sprouting from a little fruit, a statue of the Victorious One in a tattered rag, a ruler of humankind in a destitute woman's womb, and a precious image under clay, this [buddha] element abides within all sentient beings, obscured by the defilement of the adventitious poisons.

Another important and early source for buddha-nature is the Mahāyāna Mahāparinirvāṇa Sūtra (often just called the Nirvana Sutra), possibly dating to the 2nd century CE. Some scholars like Michael Radich argue that this is the earliest buddha-nature sutra. This sutra was very influential in the development of East Asian Buddhism. The Mahāparinirvāṇa Sūtra linked the concept of tathāgatagarbha with the "buddhadhātu" ("buddha-nature" or "buddha-element") and it also equates these with the eternal and pure Buddha-body, the Dharmakaya, also called vajrakaya. The sutra also presents the buddha-nature or tathagatagarbha as a "Self" or a true self (ātman), though it also attempts to argue that this claim is not incompatible with the teaching of not-self (anatman). The Nirvana sutra further claims that buddha-nature (and the Buddha's body, his Dharmakaya) is characterized by four perfections (pāramitās) or qualities: permanence (nitya), bliss (sukha), self (ātman), and purity (śuddha).

=== Other important buddha-nature sutras ===
Other important tathāgatagarbha sutras include:

- The Śrīmālādevī Siṃhanāda Sūtra (The Lion's Roar of Queen Srimala, c. 3rd century CE) which discusses the tathāgatagarbha along with other key Mahayana doctrines like the one vehicle and the luminous mind and links them to buddha-nature thought. This sutra also states that the mind's luminous nature, while being empty of adventitious defilements, is not empty of limitless buddha qualities. Furthermore, the Śrīmālādevī also says that the tathāgatagarbha is the basis of both saṃsāra and nirvāṇa and equates it with the dharmakāya (which is described as "permanent," "eternal," "everlasting," and "peaceful").
- The Anūnatvāpurnatvanirdeśa (The Teaching of Neither Increase nor Decrease). This sutra states that there is no increase or decrease in the “realm (or domain, or element) of (sentient) beings” (sattvadhātu), which is really a single domain (*ekadhātu) that is equally samsara and buddhahood and is equated with the “originally pure mind” (*prakṛtipariśuddhacitta) and tathāgatagarbha.
- The Aṅgulimālīya Sūtra (2nd c. CE) – Features the mass murderer convert Aṅgulimāla as a central character (now reformed and turned into a bodhisattva). The text attributes various qualities to the universal tathāgatagarbha, such as non-arising, independence, invariability, and not being the perceptive mind.
- Mahābheri Sūtra (Great Drum Sutra) – Describes buddha nature as luminous and pure, as eternal, everlasting, peaceful and self (ātman).
- Mahāmegha Sūtra (Great Cloud Sutra) - Like the Nirvana sutra this sutra also teaches the eternity of Buddhas (and their docetic nature) and the four perfections of permanence, bliss, self and purity as qualities of the Buddha. It also discusses the non-dual nature of all sentient beings with the Dharmadhatu along with four hundred types of samādhi.
- The Dhāraṇīśvararāja sūtra is a key source for the Ratnagotravibhāga's seven main vajra topics. It explicitly points out that the nature of the minds of sentient beings is fundamentally pure (cittaprakrtivisuddhi).
- The Laṅkāvatāra Sūtra (compiled 350–400 CE) synthesized the tathāgatagarbha doctrine and teachings of the Yogācāra school, like the ālāya-vijñāna (storehouse consciousness) and the "three natures". According to the Laṅkāvatāra, tathāgatagarbha is the same as the ālayavijñāna (though this is qualified in other passages which explain that there are two layers of the ālayavijñāna, a pure and an impure layer). The storehouse consciousness is supposed to contain the pure tathāgatagarbha, from which awakening arises. Wayman notes that this synthesis of tathāgatagarbha thought and Yogacara Buddhism is a key innovation of the Laṅkāvatāra. (Note: In the Seminal Heart series of Dzogchen a distinction is made between kun gzhi, c.q. ālaya, "the base of it all", the samsaric basis of consciousness, of all the samsaric appearances; and gzhi, "the nirvanic basis known as the ground." Sam van Schaik: "....the Seminal Heart distinction between two types of basis, the nirvanic basis known as the ground (gzhi) and the samsaric basis of consciousness, the ālaya (kun gzhi). Philip Kapleau, in "The Three Pillars of Zen", drawing from Harada roshi, discerns a "Pure Consciousness" or "Formless Self" underlying the ālāya-vijñāna. This 9th consciousness was also mentioned by Paramārtha, a 6th century Indian translator working in China.)
- The Ghanavyūha sūtra is another sutra which synthesizes Yogācāra doctrines like the three natures and the ālayavijñāna (storehouse consciousness) with the tathāgatagarbha teaching.

== Indian commentaries ==
The tathāgatagarbha doctrine was also widely discussed by Indian Mahayana scholars in treatises or commentaries, called śāstra, the most influential of which was the Ratnagotravibhāga (5th century CE).

=== Ratnagotravibhāga ===
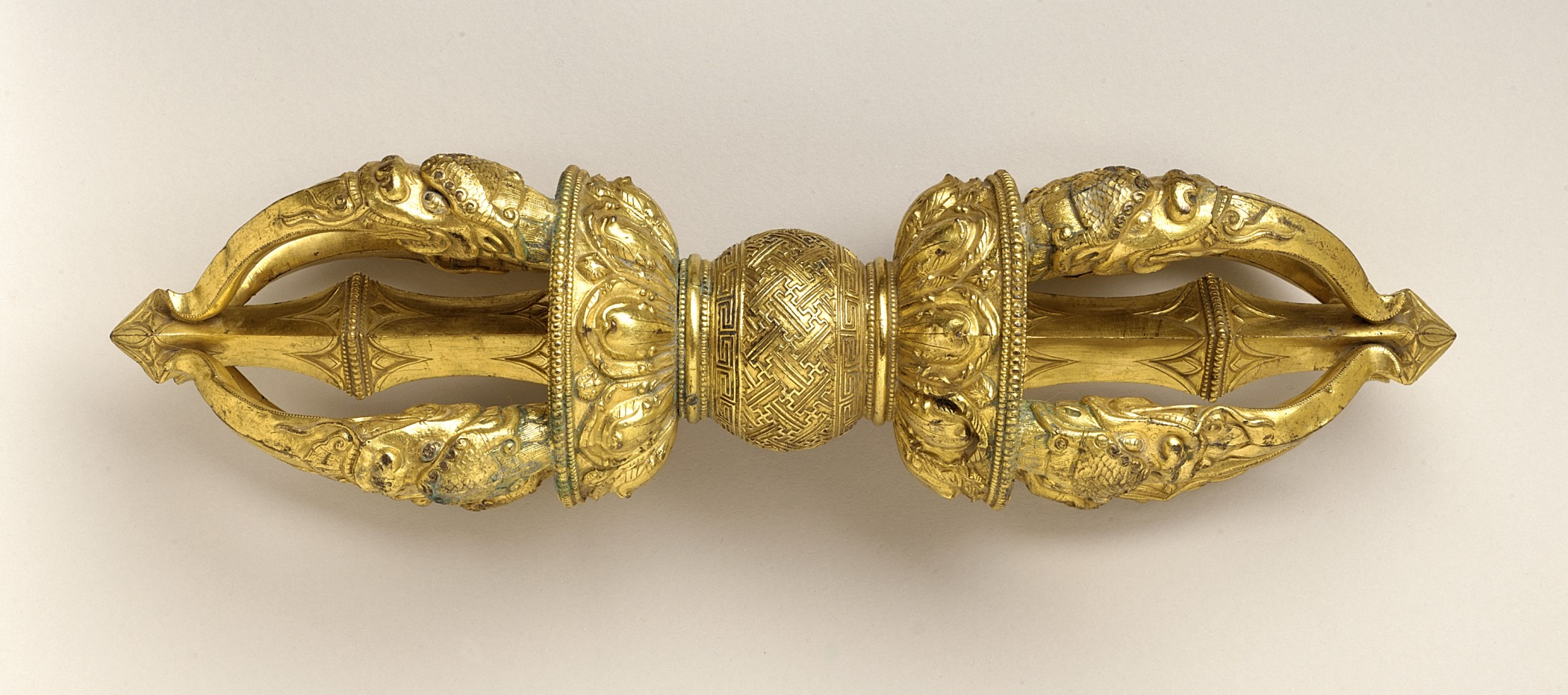
A ritual vajra, a symbol of indestructibility, which is used in the Ratnagotravibhāga as an image of the adamantine-like permanence of buddha nature.

The Ratnagotravibhāga (Investigating the Jewel Disposition), also called Uttaratantraśāstra (Treatise on the Ultimate Continuum), is a 5th century CE Indian treatise (śāstra) which synthesised major elements and themes of the tathāgatagārbha theory. It gives an overview of key themes found in many tathāgatagarbha sutras, and it cites the Tathāgatagarbha Sūtra, the Śrīmālādevī Siṃhanāda Sūtra, Mahāparinirvāṇa Sūtra, the Aṅgulimālīya Sūtra, the Anunatva-Apurnatva-Nirdesa and the Mahābherīharaka-sūtra. The Ratnagotravibhāga presents the tathāgatagarbha as "an ultimate, unconditional reality that is simultaneously the inherent, dynamic process towards its complete manifestation". Mundane and enlightened reality are seen as complementary:

Thusness [tathata] defiled is the Tathagatagarbha, and Thusness undefiled is Enlightenment.

In the Ratnagotravibhāga, the tathāgatagarbha is seen as having three specific characteristics: (1) dharmakaya, (2) suchness, and (3) disposition, as well as the general characteristic (4) non-conceptuality.

According to the Ratnagotravibhāga, all sentient beings have "the embryo of the Tathagata" in three senses:

1. the Tathāgata's dharmakāya permeates all sentient beings;
2. the Tathāgata's tathatā is omnipresent (avyatibheda);
3. the Tathāgata's species (gotra, a synonym for tathagatagarbha) occurs in them.

The Ratnagotravibhāga equates enlightenment with the nirvāṇa-realm and the dharmakāya. It gives a variety of synonyms for garbha, the most frequently used being gotra and dhatu.

This text also explains the tathāgatagarbha in terms of luminous mind, stating that "the luminous nature of the mind Is unchanging, just like space."

=== Other possible Indian treatises on buddha-nature ===
Takasaki Jikido notes various buddha nature treatises which exist only in Chinese and which are similar in some ways to the Ratnagotra. These works are unknown in other textual traditions and scholars disagree on whether they are translations, original compositions or a mixture of the two. These works are:

- Dharmadhātvaviśeṣaśāstra (Dasheng fajie wuchabie lun 大乘法界無差別論), said to have been translated by Paramartha and attributed to Saramati (the same author which the Chinese tradition states wrote the Ratnagotra).
- Buddhagotraśāstra (佛性論, Fó xìng lùn, Buddha-nature treatise, Taishō 1610), said to have been translated by Paramartha and is attributed by Chinese tradition to Vasubandhu
- Anuttarâśrayasūtra, which according to Takasaki "is clearly a composition based upon the Ratna."

=== Madhyamaka school ===
Indian Madhyamaka philosophers interpreted the theory as a description of emptiness and as a non-implicative negation. Bhaviveka's Tarkajvala states:

[The expression] "possessing the tathagata heart" is [used] because emptiness, signlessness, wishlessness, and so on, exist in the mind streams of all sentient beings. However, it is not something like a permanent and all-pervasive person that is the inner agent. For we find [passages] such as "All phenomena have the nature of emptiness, signlessness, and wishlessness. What is emptiness, signlessness, and wishlessness is the Tathagata."

According to Candrakirti's Madhyamakāvatārabhāsya the storehouse consciousness "is nothing but emptiness that is taught through the term 'alaya-consciousness.'" Go Lotsawa states that this statement is referencing the tathāgatagarbha doctrine. Candrakirti's Madhyamakāvatārabhāsya also argues, basing itself on the Lankavatara sutra, that "the statement of the emptiness of sentient beings being a buddha adorned with all major and minor marks is of expedient meaning".

Kamalasila's (c. 740–795) Madhyamakaloka associates tathāgatagarbha with luminosity and luminosity with emptiness. According to Kamalasila the idea that all sentient beings have tathāgatagarbha means that all beings can attain full awakening and also refers to how "the term tathāgata expresses that the dharmadhātu, which is characterized by personal and phenomenal identitylessness, is natural luminosity."

Paul Williams puts forward the Madhyamaka interpretation of the buddha-nature as emptiness in the following terms:

… if one is a Madhyamika then that which enables sentient beings to become buddhas must be the very factor that enables the minds of sentient beings to change into the minds of Buddhas. That which enables things to change is their simple absence of inherent existence, their emptiness. Thus the tathagatagarbha becomes emptiness itself, but specifically emptiness when applied to the mental continuum.

Uniquely among Madhyamaka texts, some texts attributed to Nagarjuna, mainly poetic works like the Dharmadhatustava, Cittavajrastava, and Bodhicittavivarana, associate the term tathāgatagarbha with the luminous nature of the mind.

=== Yogācāra school ===
According to Brunnhölzl, "all early Indian Yogācāra masters (such as Asanga, Vasubandhu, Sthiramati, and Asvabhava), if they refer to the term tathāgatagarbha at all, always explain it as nothing but suchness in the sense of twofold identitylessness".

Some later Yogacara scholars spoke of the tathāgatagarbha in more positive terms, such as Jñanasrimitra who in his Sakarasiddhi equates it with the appearances of lucidity (prakāśa-rupa). Likewise, the Vikramashila scholar Ratnākaraśānti describes buddha-nature as the natural luminous mind, which is a non-dual self-awareness. Brunnhölzl also notes that for Ratnākaraśānti, this luminosity is equivalent to the Yogacara concept of the perfected nature, which he sees as an implicative negation. Ratnākaraśānti also describes this ultimate self-nature as radiance (prakāśa, ‘shining forth’), which is the capacity to appear (pratibhāsa).

The Yogācāra concept of the alaya-vijñana (store consciousness) also came to be associated by some scholars with the tathāgatagarbha. This can be seen in sutras like the Lankavatara, the Srimaladevi and in the translations of Paramartha. The concept of the ālaya-vijñāna originally meant defiled consciousness: defiled by the workings of the five senses and the mind. It was also seen as the mūla-vijñāna, the base-consciousness or "stream of consciousness" (Mindstream) from which awareness and perception spring.

Around 300 CE, the Yogācāra school systematized the prevalent ideas on the nature of the Buddha in the Trikaya (triple body) doctrine, in which the Buddha is held to have three bodies: Nirmanakaya (transformation body which people see on earth), Sambhogakāya (a subtle body which appears to bodhisattvas) and the Dharmakāya (ultimate reality). This doctrine was also later to be synthesized with buddha-nature teachings by various sources (with buddha-nature generally referring to the Dharmakaya as it does in some sutras).

The Yogācāra school also had a doctrine of "gotra" (lineage, family) which held that there were five categories of living beings each with their own inner nature. To make this teaching compatible with the notion of buddha-nature in all beings, Yogācāra scholars in China such as Tz'u-en (慈恩, 632–682) the first patriarch in China, advocated two types of nature: the latent nature found in all beings (理佛性) and the buddha-nature in practice (行佛性). The latter nature was determined by the innate seeds in the alaya.

== East Asian Buddhism ==
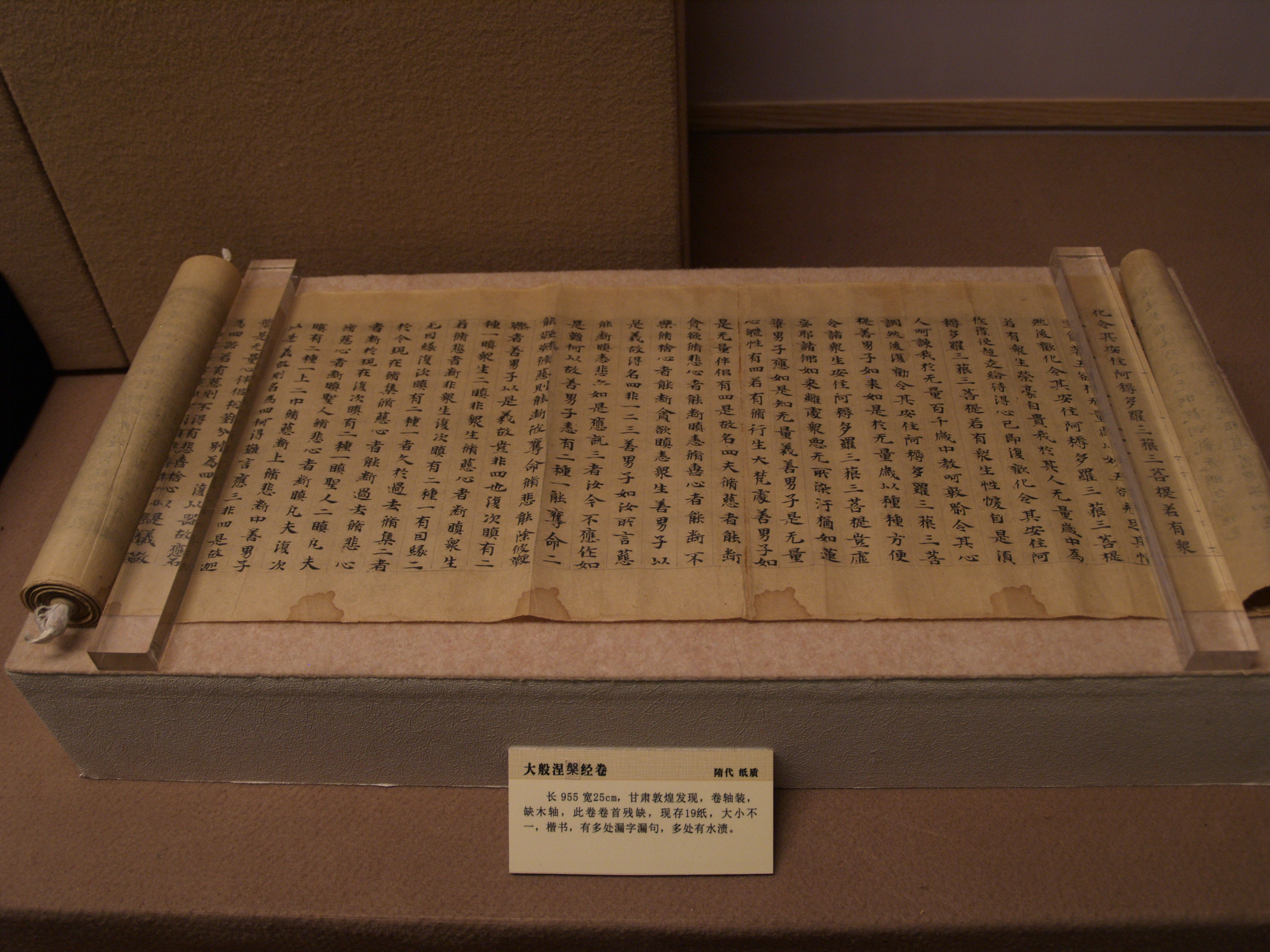
A Sui dynasty manuscript of the Nirvāṇa Sūtra

The doctrines associated with buddha-nature (Chinese: fóxìng) and tathāgatagarbha (rúláizàng) were extremely influential in the development of East Asian Buddhism. The buddha-nature idea was introduced into China with the translation of the Nirvana Sutra in the early fifth century and this text became the central source of buddha-nature doctrine in Chinese Buddhism. When Buddhism was introduced to China, it was initially understood through comparing it with native Chinese philosophies such as neo-daoism. Based on their understanding of the Mahayana Mahaparinirvana Sutra some Chinese Buddhists supposed that the teaching of the buddha-nature was, as stated by that sutra, the final Buddhist teaching, and that there is an essential truth above emptiness and the two truths. This idea was often interpreted as being similar to the ideas of the Dao, non-being (wu), and Principle (Li) in Chinese philosophy and developed into what was called "essence-function" thought (體用, pinyin: tǐ yòng) which held there were two main ontological levels to reality, the most foundational being the buddha-nature, the "essence" of all phenomena (which in turn were the "functions" of buddha-nature).

=== Awakening of Faith in the Mahāyāna ===
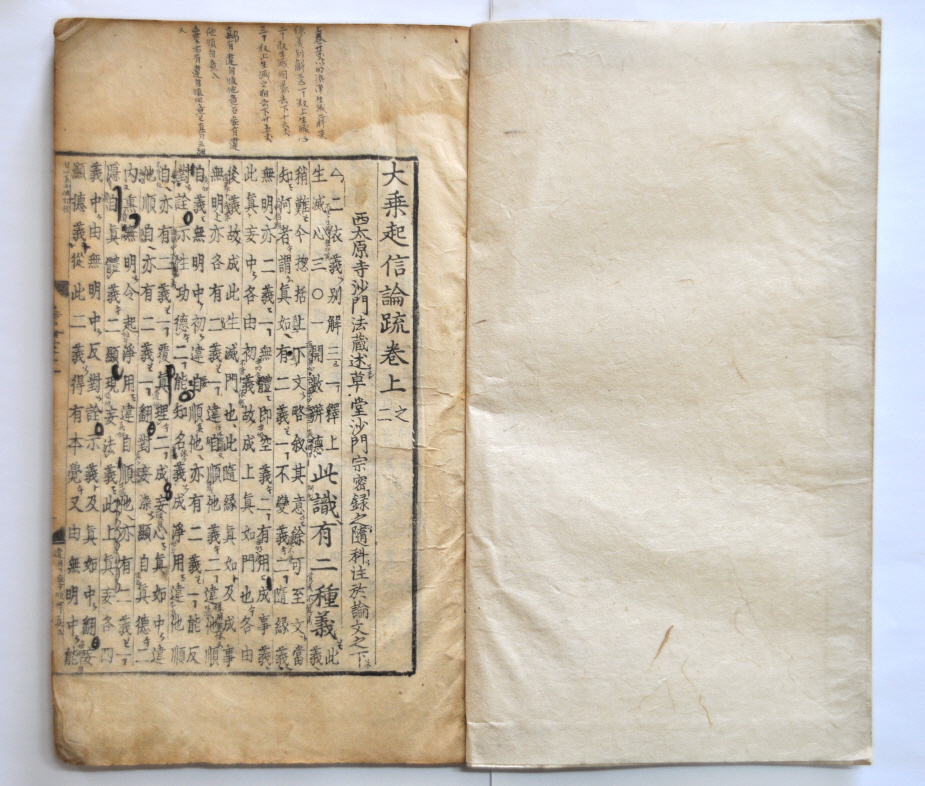
A page of a commentary on the Awakening of Faith, one of the most influential buddha-nature works in East Asian Buddhism.

The Awakening of Faith in the Mahayana (Dàshéng Qǐxìn Lùn) was very influential in the development of Chinese Buddhism. While the text is traditionally attributed to the Indian Aśvaghoṣa, no Sanskrit version of the text is extant. The earliest known versions are written in Chinese, and contemporary scholars believe that the text is a Chinese composition.

The Awakening of Faith offers an ontological synthesis of buddha-nature and Yogacara thought from the perspective of "essence-function" philosophy. It describes the "One Mind" which "includes in itself all states of being of the phenomenal and the transcendental world." The Awakening of Faith tries to harmonize the ideas of the tathāgatagarbha and the storehouse consciousness (ālāyavijñāna) into a single theory which sees self, world, mind and ultimate realty as an integrated One Mind, which is the ultimate substratum of all things (including samsara and nirvana).

In the Awakening of Faith the "one mind" has two aspects, namely "the aspect of enlightenment," (which is tathata, suchness, the true nature of things), and "the aspect of nonenlightenment" (samsara, the cycle of birth and death, defilement and ignorance). This text was in line with an essay by Emperor Wu of the Liang dynasty (reign 502–549 CE), in which he postulated a pure essence, the enlightened mind, trapped in darkness, which is ignorance. By this ignorance the pure mind is trapped in samsara. This resembles the tathāgatagarba and the idea of the defilement of the luminous mind.

In a similar fashion to the Awakening of Faith, the Korean Vajrasamādhi Sūtra (685 CE) uses the doctrine of Essence-Function to explain the tathāgatagarbha (also called "the dharma of the One Mind" and original enlightenment) as having two elements: one essential, immutable, changeless and still (the "essence"); the other an active and salvational inspirational power (function).

=== Active versus passive aspects of buddha-nature ===
According to Ching Keng, there are two different types of tathāgatagarbha theory: [1] weak tathāgatagarbha theory, associated with texts such as the Ratnagotravibhāga; and [2] strong tathāgatagarbha theory, associated with such texts as the Awakening of Faith. According to the weak theory, although suchness pervades all sentient beings, it is strictly unchanging and unconditioned. Thus, it can have no effects in sentient beings and does not play an active role in their liberation. On the other hand, strong tathāgatagarbha theory blurs the distinction between the conditioned and the unconditioned. It maintains that suchness, while unconditioned, nonetheless evolves into conditioned dharmas. In this way, according to the strong theory, the storehouse consciousness and all the illusory phenomena projected by it are modifications of suchness. Keng associates the weak theory with the Indian understanding of tathāgatagarbha and the strong theory with that of Chinese Buddhism.

According to the Huayan patriarch Fazang, suchness plays an active role in creating the realm of perception and the world of phenomena. This is unlike the Yogācāra view of Xuanzang, for whom suchness is inactive, playing only a passive role in the evolution of the phenomenal world. According to the faxiang ("dharma characteristics") view associated with Xuanzang's Yogācāra, the relationship of phenomena to suchness is that of "house and ground" in which the house (phenomena) is supported by the ground (suchness), but the two are nonetheless distinct. On the other hand, according to the faxing ("dharma nature") view of Huayan, the relationship between suchness and phenomena is one of "water and wave" in which the wind of ignorance stirs the water (suchness) to produce waves (phenomena). The Huayan patriarch and Chan master Guifeng Zongmi also explained that the "one dharmadhātu" gives rise to all phenomena through two orders of causation: [1] nature origination (xingqi), and [2] conditioned origination (yuanqi). Regarding the former, where "nature" (xing) refers to the pure mind as the ultimate source, "origination" (qi) refers to its manifestation as phenomenal appearances. This also refers to "the arising of functioning (yung) based on the essence (t'i)." As Zongmi explained, "the entire essence of the dharmadhatu as the nature arises (ch'i) to form all dharmas."

Robert Buswell observes that while the passive aspect of the tathāgatagarbha can be seen from the earliest stratum of tathāgatagarbha literature, texts such as the Vajrasamādhi Sūtra, an East Asian apocryphon, emphasize the tathāgatagarbha as an active agent which constantly exerts a beneficial influence on sentient beings. For example, the Vajrasamādhi Sūtra says, "The original enlightenment of each and every sentient being is constantly enlightening all sentient beings . . . prompting them all to regain their original enlightenment." In addition to the eight consciousnesses of Yogācāra, this text also teaches the existence of an immaculate ninth consciousness, the amalavijñāna. According to Wŏnhyo's commentary, this is equated with original enlightenment and constitutes the force which makes awakening accessible to sentient beings. Buswell writes, "The amalavijñāna as original enlightenment is therefore constantly acting on sentient beings, exerting a beneficial influence that ultimately will prompt those beings to rediscover their inherent enlightenment. This treatment of amalavijñāna as the catalyst of enlightenment corresponds to the active interpretation of the tathāgatagarbha."

According to the Awakening of Faith, suchness has the power of perfuming (vāsanā) sentient beings' minds, causing them to loathe saṃsāra and believe that they possess the principle of suchness within themselves. This is "permeation through manifestation of the essence of suchness" which Hakeda explains as "the inner urge of suchness in human beings to emerge, so to speak, from the state of unawareness to the state of awareness, or from the unconscious to the conscious. It is an internal movement of suchness within... Suchness within, i.e., original enlightenment, is constantly asserting itself in order to be actualized by breaking through the wall of ignorance." In his treatment of the relationship between faith and sudden enlightenment, Sung Bae Park also explains that in East Asian Mahāyāna, faith arises as the natural function of one's own originally enlightened Mind. In this way, the Mind of original enlightenment and faith constitute a non-dual essence-function relationship (t'i-yung). Buswell also notes the prominent role of faith in the sermons of the Chan master Linji Yixuan. According to Buswell, faith for Linji was not blind acceptance, but rather an inherent faculty emanating constantly from the enlightened nature, and thus equivalent to the "innate functioning" of the mind-essence.

Wŏnhyo's commentary on the Awakening of Faith also explains how original enlightenment exerts a beneficial influence on sentient beings such that, even while they are deluded, they nonetheless possess a degree of enlightened functioning. According to Wŏnhyo, "Because of the influence of original enlightenment, [the deluded mind] comes to have a modicum of enlightened function (kagyong/jueyong)." Wŏnhyo's commentary on the Awakening of Faith also treats the One Mind as an active force which permeates all sentient beings, leading them back to their source. See the following, from Wŏnhyo's discussion of the One Mind's "three greatnesses" of essence (t'i), attributes (hsiang), and functions (yung):

Because [One Mind] completely possesses the merits of the essence [t'i] which permeates [all] sentient beings, consequently [we] believe that because of the permeation of the attributes [hsiang] we are bound to return to the Source. Faith in the operation of boundless merit is faith in the greatness of the operation [of One Mind], because there is nothing [that One Mind] does not do.

In recent times, the Korean Sŏn master Daehaeng (1927–2012) taught that one's inherent essence or foundation, which she called Juingong, was the true doer of all things. According to her view, Juingong is empty and manifests ceaselessly without a fixed shape, while also being endowed with a bright wisdom that guides and leads all beings forward. She regarded Juingong as the power of buddha-nature in all beings which can dissolve all painful karma, in the manner of a snowflake before a vast furnace. As such, she taught that one should let go and entrust whatever arises in one's life to this foundation which is doing everything and can resolve everything. She said:

Do not overstrain yourself trying to understand this principle. Believe that "My daily life, as it is, is done by the foundation," and let it go. Live while believing and entrusting. Do not try to understand "What is entrusting it to Juingong?" by using your intellect. Just believe that "Things that go well are from there, and things that go badly are also from there. Everything is done by that place, and can be solved by only that place." This is letting go and entrusting it to Juingong.

=== In Chinese Yogacara and Madhyamaka ===
By the 6th century CE, buddha-nature had been well established in Chinese Buddhism and many theories were developed to explain it. One influential figure who wrote about buddha nature was Jingying Huiyuan (523–592 CE), a Chinese Yogacarin who argued for a kind of idealism which held that "all dharmas without exception originate and are formed from the true[-mind], and other than the true[-mind], there exists absolutely nothing which can give rise to false thoughts." Jingying Huiyuan equated this "true mind" with the storehouse consciousness and with buddha-nature and held that it was an essence, a true consciousness and a metaphysical principle that ensured that all sentient beings will reach enlightenment.

In the sixth and seventh centuries, Yogacara theory became associated with a substantialist non-dual metaphysics which saw buddha nature as an eternal ground. This idea was promoted by figures like Ratnamati. Chinese Yogacara included numerous traditions with their own interpretations of buddha-nature. The Dilun, or Daśabhūmikā school, and the Shelun school were some of the earliest schools in this Chinese Yogacara. The Dilun school became split on the issue of the relationship between the storehouse consciousness and buddha-nature. The southern faction held that the storehouse consciousness was identical with the pure mind, while the northern school held that the storehouse consciousness was exclusively a deluded and defiled mind. In addition to the standard eight consciousnesses of classical Yogācāra, some Chinese Yogācāra schools such as the Shelun maintained the existence of an immaculate ninth consciousness known as the amalavijñāna, which lay beyond the eighth (ālayavijñāna, the storehouse consciousness), and served as the basis for all the other consciousnesses.

In contrast with the Chinese Yogacara view, the Chinese Madhyamaka scholar Jizang (549–623 CE) sought to remove all ontological connotations of the term as a metaphysical reality and saw buddha-nature as being synonymous with terms like "tathata," "dharmadhatu," "ekayana," "wisdom," "ultimate reality," "middle way" and also the wisdom that contemplates dependent origination. In formulating his view, Jizang was influenced by the earlier Chinese Madhyamaka thinker Sengzhao (384–414 CE) who was a key figure in outlining an understanding of emptiness which was based on the Indian sources and not on Daoist concepts which previous Chinese Buddhists had used. Jizang used the compound "Middle Way-buddha-nature" (zhongdao foxing 中道佛性) to refer to his view. Jizang was also one of the first Chinese philosophers to famously argue that plants and insentient objects have buddha-nature, which he also termed true reality and universal principle (dao).

=== In Tiantai ===
The Tiantai school is one of the first native Chinese doctrinal schools, and the primary figure of this tradition is the scholar Zhiyi. According to Paul L. Swanson, none of Zhiyi's works discuss buddha-nature explicitly at length however. Yet it is still an important concept in his philosophy, which is seen as synonymous with the ekayana principle outlined in the Lotus Sutra. Swanson argues that for Zhiyi, buddha-nature is:

an active threefold process which involves the way reality is, the wisdom to see reality as it is, and the practice required to attain this wisdom. Buddha Nature is threefold: the three aspects of reality, wisdom, and practice are interdependent—one aspect does not make any sense without the others.

Thus, for Zhiyi, buddha-nature has three aspects which he bases on passages from the Lotus sutra and the Nirvana sutra. These three aspects are:

1. The direct cause of attaining Buddhahood, the innate potential in all sentient beings to become Buddhas, which is the aspect of 'true nature', the way things are.
2. The complete cause of attaining Buddhahood, which is the aspect of wisdom that illuminates the true nature and the goal of practice.
3. The conditional causes of attaining Buddhahood, which is the aspect of the practices and activities that lead to Buddhahood.

The later Tiantai scholar Zhanran would expand the Tiantai view of buddha-nature, which he saw as synonymous with suchness, to argue for the idea that insentient rocks and plants also have buddha-nature.

=== In Huayan ===
The other major native Chinese doctrinal school is the Huayan school. The Huayan tradition heavily relied on buddha nature sources like the Awakening of Faith and on the doctrine of principle (理, li, or the ultimate pattern) and phenomena (shi). In the Huayan tradition, the ultimate principle is associated with buddha-nature, and with the One Mind of the Awakening of Faith. This ultimate nature is seen as the ontological source and ground of all phenomena. This is a key idea in Huayan thought which is called "nature-origination" (xingqi). According to this doctrine defended by Huayan thinkers like Fazang, the entire universe is a manifestation of the one nature, and it is also fully interfused with its source. As such, the ultimate principle is non-dual with all relative phenomena. Because the ultimate source of all things is also interdependent and interconnected with them, it remains a ground which is empty of self-existence (svabhava) and thus it is not an independent essence.

=== In Chan Buddhism ===
In Chan Buddhism, buddha-nature tends to be seen as the essential nature of all beings, while also emphasizing that buddha-nature is emptiness, the absence of an independent and substantial "self". The term buddha-nature is interpreted in various ways throughout the voluminous Chan literature. In the East Mountain Teaching of early Chan, buddha-nature was equated with the nature of mind, while later sects sometimes rejected any identification of the term with the mind. This rejection of any reification of the term is reflected in the recorded sayings of Chan master Mazu Daoyi (709–788) of the influential Hongzhou school, who sometimes would teach on the "ordinary mind" or say "Mind is Buddha," but at other times would say "Neither mind nor Buddha." (Note: Compare Mazu's "Mind is Buddha" versus "No mind, no Buddha": "When Ch'an Master Fa-ch'ang of Ta-mei Mountain went to see the Patriarch for the first time, he asked, "What is Buddha?" The Patriarch replied, "Mind is Buddha." [On hearing this] Fa-ch'ang had great awakening. Later he went to live on Ta-mei mountain. When the Patriarch heard that he was residing on the mountain, he sent one of his monks to go there and ask Fa-ch'ang, "What did the Venerable obtain when he saw Ma-tsu, so that he has come to live on this mountain?" Fach'ang said, "Ma-tsu told me that mind is Buddha; so I came to live here." The monk said, "Ma-tsu's teaching has changed recently." Fa-ch'ang asked, "What is the difference?" The monk said, "Nowadays he also says, 'Neither mind nor Buddha."' Fa-ch'ang said, "That old man still hasn't stopped confusing people. You can have 'neither mind nor Buddha,' I only care for 'mind is Buddha."' The monk returned to the Patriarch and reported what has happened. "The plum is ripe." said the Patriarch.")

The influential Chan patriarch Guifeng Zongmi (780–841), who was also a patriarch of Huayan, interpreted buddha-nature as "empty tranquil awareness" (k'ung-chi chih), which he took from the Ho-tse school of Chan. Following the Srimala sutra, he interpreted the theory of emptiness as presented in the Prajñaparamita sutras as provisional and saw the awareness which is buddha-nature as the definitive teaching of Buddhism.

Chan masters from Huineng (7th-century China), Chinul (12th century Korea), Hakuin Ekaku (18th-century Japan) to Hsu Yun (20th-century China), have taught that the process of awakening begins with the light of the mind turning around to recognize its own true nature, so that the storehouse consciousness (also called the 8th consciousness in Yogacara Buddhism), which is also the tathāgatagarbha, is transformed into the "bright mirror wisdom". According to D.T. Suzuki, the Zen view of buddha-nature can be found in the Laṅkāvatāra Sūtra, which states that one must let go of all discriminating notions of any kind to attain the perfect knowledge of the tathāgatagarbha. According to the Platform Sūtra, the eight consciousnesses transform into the four wisdoms, and yet, only their names are transformed, the consciousnesses are not transformed in their essence.

A famous reference to buddha-nature in the Chan tradition is found in the influential koan called the mu-koan (from The Gateless Barrier, a 13th century koan collection) which asks "does a dog have Buddha nature?" The enigmatic response given by the master is "no" (wú, Chinese, mu in Japanese) which can be interpreted in various ways.

According to Heng-Ching Shih, the teaching of the universal buddha-nature does not intend to assert the existence of a substantial, entity-like self endowed with the excellent features of a Buddha. Rather, buddha-nature simply represents the potentiality to be realized in the future.

Hsing Yun, forty-eighth patriarch of the Linji school, equates the buddha-nature with the dharmakāya in line with pronouncements in key tathāgatagarbha sūtras. He defines these as "the inherent nature that exists in all beings....transcendental reality....the unity of the Buddha with everything that exists," and sees it as the goal of Mahayana Buddhism.

=== Japanese Buddhism ===
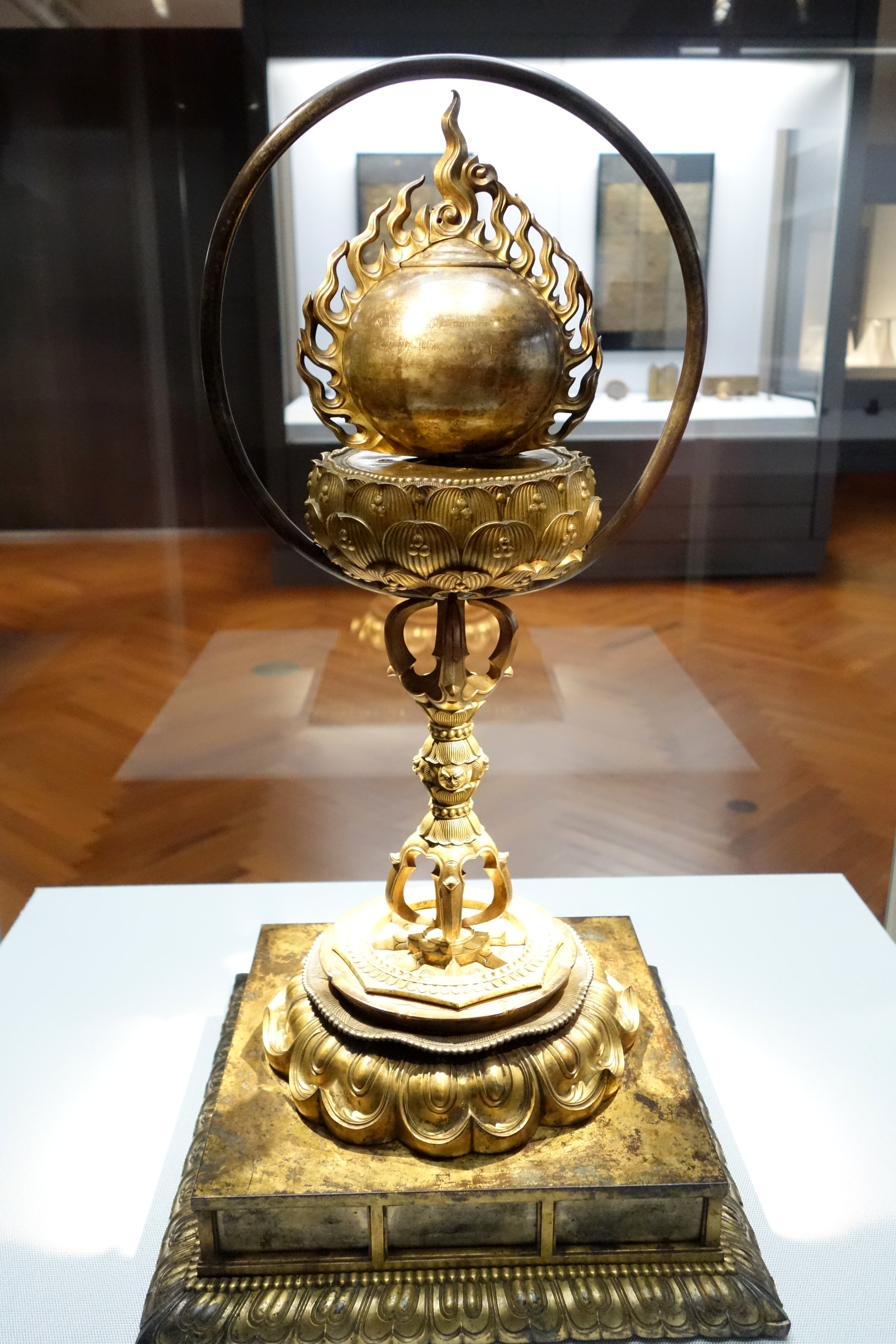
A Japanese Kamakura period reliquary topped with a cintamani (a "wish fulfilling jewel"). Buddha nature texts often use the metaphor of a hidden jewel (buddha-nature) which all beings have, but are unaware of.

The major Japanese Buddhist traditions all take the idea of buddha-nature (Japanese: busshō, 仏性) as a central teaching, from Tendai and Shingon, to the new Kamakura schools. One of the most important developments of buddha-nature thought in Japanese Buddhism was hongaku theory (本覚, innate or original enlightenment) which developed within the Tendai school from the cloistered rule era (1086–1185) through the Edo period (1688–1735) and is derived from the Awakening of Faith (which uses the term pen-chileh, “original enlightenment”). Jacqueline Stone writes that Tendai doctrine held that enlightenment was "inherent from the outset and as accessible in the present, rather than as the fruit of a long process of cultivation." It was often held that hongaku was a feature of all phenomena, including plants and inanimate objects.

Hongaku thought was also influential in the development of the new Kamakura Buddhist schools, such as Japanese Pure Land Buddhism, Zen, and Nichiren. Japanese Pure Land Buddhism relied on Tendai buddha-nature doctrine. The founder of the Jōdo Shinshū of Pure Land Buddhism, Shinran, equated buddha-nature with the central Shin concept of shinjin (true faith or the entrusting mind).

The founder of the Sōtō school of Zen Buddhism, Dōgen Zenji, held that buddha-nature was simply the true nature of reality and being. This true nature was just impermanence, becoming and 'vast emptiness'. Because he saw the whole universe as an expression of buddha-nature, he held that even grass and trees are buddha-nature. According to Dōgen:

Therefore, the very impermanency of grass and tree, thicket and forest is the Buddha nature. The very impermanency of men and things, body and mind, is the Buddha nature. Nature and lands, mountains and rivers, are impermanent because they are the Buddha nature. Supreme and complete enlightenment, because it is impermanent, is the Buddha nature.

Buddha-nature was likewise influential for the other sects of Zen, like Rinzai.

Nichiren Buddhism, founded by Nichiren (1222–1282), views the buddha-nature present in all beings as "the inner potential for attaining Buddhahood". The emphasis in Nichiren Buddhism is on attaining Buddhahood in this lifetime, described as manifesting or summoning forth buddha-nature by chanting the name of the Lotus Sutra: Namu Myōhō Renge Kyō Like the classic Tendai hongaku doctrine, Nichiren held that all life and even all insentient matter (such mandalas, images, statues) also possesses buddha nature, because they serve as objects of worship.

== Tibetan Buddhism ==
In Tibetan Buddhist scholastics, there are two main camps of interpreting buddha-nature:

- There are those who argue that tathāgatagarbha is just emptiness (described either as dharmadhatu or the nature of phenomena). This pure Madhyamaka view is described in as "a nonimplicative negation", which means that in one's philosophical analysis, one negates all forms of existence (and non-existence) completely, leaving nothing left over.
- There are those who see it as an implicative negation, which means that there is something further to be said about buddha-nature that is not just the Madhyamaka emptiness based on pure negations of all concepts. This could include positive descriptions like the union of the mind's emptiness and luminosity, a non-dual buddha-wisdom, or even the eternal pure buddhic Self which includes all buddha-qualities (as in Jonang Shentong).

An early Tibetan translator, Ngok Lotsawa (1050–1109) argues in his commentary to the Uttaratantra that buddha-nature is a non-implicative negation, which is to say that it is emptiness, as a total negation of inherent existence (svabhava) that does not imply that anything is left un-negated (in terms of its svabhava). Another early figure, Chaba Chokyi Senge (1109–1169) also argued that buddha-nature was a non-implicative negation. The Kadampa tradition generally followed Ngok Lotsawa by holding that Buddha- nature was a nonimplicative negation. The Gelug school, which sees itself as a continuation of the Kadampas, also hold this view, while also holding, as Chaba did, that buddha-nature teachings are of expedient meaning.

This interpretation is sometimes called the rangtong interpretation of Prasaṅgika Madhyamaka. This view interprets the buddha-nature teaching as an expedient way to talk about the emptiness of inherent existence and should not be taken literally. Other schools, especially the Jonang, and some within the Kagyu tradition have tended to accept the shentong ("other-empty") philosophy, which discerns an ultimate reality which "is empty of adventitious defilements which are intrinsically other than it, but is not empty of its own inherent existence". Shentong influenced interpretations tend to rely heavily on the buddha-nature sutras to balance the negative dialectics of Madhyamaka.

These interpretations of the tathagatagarbha-teachings have been a matter of intensive debates in Tibetan Buddhism down to this day.

=== Nyingma ===
Morten Ostensen writes that the buddha-nature teaching (also known as "sugatagarbha", Wylie: bde gshegs snying po, in Tibetan tantric sources), first entered Tibetan Buddhism through the translation of the Nyingma school's Guhyagarbha Tantra in the eighth century. During the early translation period, other works which synthesized and reconciled buddha-nature thought with Yogacara and Madhyamaka philosophy were also translated by Tibetan scholars like Yeshe De (mid 8th – early 9th century). One of these works is Kamalashila"s Madhyamakāloka.

Yeshe De describes the sugatagarbha as twofold. It is the impure mind of sentient beings, the ālayavijñāna, and it is also the pure "natural spiritual disposition" (rigs) that is present within all beings which is also called the dharmakāya, and which he also calls the root (rtsa) and the ground (gzhi).

The teaching of buddha-nature is also a key source for Tibetan Dzogchen texts, which presents the sugatagarbha as equivalent to the ultimate ground or basis of all reality. This teaching can be found in early Dzogchen sources like Nubchen Sangye Yeshe's (9th century) Lamp for the Eye of Contemplation equates buddha-nature with this ultimate basis, which it also calls by various names like "the spontaneous essence", "the innermost treasury of all vehicles", "the great universal grandfather [spyi myes], is to be experienced directly by self-awareness [rang rig pas]", "sphere of the great circle [thig le chen po'i klong] of the self-awareness."

The Nyingma school view of buddha-nature is generally marked by the tendency to align the idea with Dzogchen views and with Prasangika Madhyamaka. This trend begins with the work of Rongzom (1042–1136) and continues into the work of Longchenpa (1308–1364) and Mipham (1846–1912).

Mipham Rinpoche, the most authoritative figure in modern Nyingma, adopted a view of buddha-nature as the unity of appearance and emptiness, relating it to the descriptions of the ground in Dzogchen as outlined by Longchenpa. This ground is said to be primordially pure (ka dag) and spontaneously present (Ihun grub). In Dzogchen, buddha nature, which is equated with the basis (gzhi) of all phenomena, is often explained as the unity of "primordial purity" (Wylie: ka dag) and "natural perfection" or "spontaneous presence" (lhun grub). (Note: The three aspects of the basis in Dzogchen, the empty essence, the spontaneously present nature, and the compassionate resonance, are considered indivisible and are iconographically represented by the Gankyil.) The Nyingma commentary of Ju Mipham upon the Ratnagotravibhaga from a Dzogchen viewpoint has been rendered into English by Duckworth (2008).

According to Mipham, buddha-nature is neither [1] truly established, [2] a mere emptiness, nor [3] an impermanent and conditioned entity. In this way, he distinguished his unique position on buddha-nature from those of the Jonang, Gelug, and Sakya; which correspond respectively to the first, second, and third positions. Moreover, as Mipham's commentator Bötrül points out, for Mipham, buddha-nature is neither established from the point of view of ultimate valid cognition, nor is it posited merely from the point of view of the mistaken perception of ordinary beings. Mipham instead held that buddha-nature is established by a conventional valid cognition of pure vision.

The modern Nyingma scholars Khenchen Palden Sherab (1938–2010) and Khenpo Tsewang Dongyal (born 1950), emphasise that the essential nature of the mind (the buddha-nature) is not a blankness, but is characterized by wonderful qualities and a non-conceptual perfection that is already present and complete, it's just obscured and we fail to recognize it.

=== Sakya ===
Sakya Pandita (1182–1251), the central figure of the Sakya school, sees the buddha-nature as the dharmadhatu free from all reference points, and states that the teaching that buddha-nature exists in all beings is of expedient meaning (not ultimate) and that its basis is emptiness, citing Candrakirti's Madhyamakāvatārabhāsya. The Sakya scholar Rongtön (1367–1449) meanwhile, argued that buddha-nature is suchness, with stains, or emptiness of the mind with stains.

Sakya scholar Buton Rinchen Drub (1290–1364) likewise held that the buddha-nature teachings were not an ultimate or final teaching (like emptiness), seeing them as teachings of expedient meaning that merely points to emptiness. His view was that the basis for these teachings is the alaya-vijñana and also that buddha-nature is the dharmakaya of a buddha but "never exists in the great mass of sentient beings".

According to Brunnhölzl, in the works of the influential Sakya scholar Gorampa Sonam Senge (1429–1489), buddha-nature is

nondual unity of minds lucidity and emptiness or awareness and emptiness free from all reference points. It is not mere emptiness because sheer emptiness cannot be the basis of both samsára and nirvána. However, it is not mere lucidity either because this lucidity is a conditioned entity and the tathágata heart is unconditioned.

Sakya Chokden (1428–1507) meanwhile argues that the ultimate buddha-nature is an implicative negation, which means that its philosophical negation leaves something positive that is not negated by analysis. This is "mind's natural luminosity free from all extremes of reference points, which is the sphere of personally experienced wisdom."

=== Jonang ===
The Jonang school, whose foremost historical figure was the Tibetan scholar-monk Dolpopa Sherab Gyaltsen (1292–1361), sees the buddha-nature as the very ground of the Buddha himself, as the "permanent indwelling of the Buddha in the basal state". According to Brunnhölzl, Dolpopa, basing himself on certain tathāgatagarbha sutras, argued that the buddha-nature is "ultimately really established, everlasting, eternal, permanent, immutable (therzug), and being beyond dependent origination." This is the foundation of what is called the Shentong view.

The Buddhist tantric scripture entitled Chanting the Names of Mañjuśrī (Mañjuśrī-nāma-saṅgīti), repeatedly exalts, as portrayed by Dolpopa, not the non-Self but the Self, and applies the following terms to this ultimate reality: "the Buddha-Self, the beginningless Self, the solid Self, the diamond Self." These terms are applied in a manner which reflects the cataphatic approach to Buddhism, typical of much of Dolpopa's writings.

Cyrus Stearns writes that Dolpopa's attitude to the third turning of the wheel (i.e. the buddha-nature teachings) is that they "are the final definitive statements on the nature of ultimate reality, the primordial ground or substratum beyond the chain of dependent origination, and which is only empty of other, relative phenomena."

=== Kagyu ===
According to Brunnhölzl, "virtually all Kagyu masters hold the teaching on buddha nature to be of definitive meaning and deny that the tathagata heart is just sheer emptiness or a nonimplicative negation." This means that most Kagyu scholars do not think that the strictly negative Madhyamaka explanation of buddha-nature is suffient on its own (without drawing on the buddha-nature sutras) to explain buddha-nature. Some Kagyu views can be similar to Jonang shentong and sometimes use shentong language, but they are generally less absolutist than Jonang views (the exception is Jamgon Kongtrul Lodro Taye, who largely follows Taranatha and Dolpopa but at times blends their positions with the Third Karmapa's view).

In Kagyu, the view of the Third Karmapa Rangjung Dorje is generally seen as the most authoritative. His is the view that buddha-nature is "mind's luminous ultimate nature or nondual wisdom, which is the basis of everything in samsara and nirvana." Thrangu Rinpoche sees the Buddha-nature as the indivisible oneness of wisdom and emptiness:

The union of wisdom and emptiness is the essence of Buddha-hood or what is called Buddha-nature (Skt. Tathagata-garbha) because it contains the very seed, the potential of Buddhahood. It resides in each and every being and because of this essential nature, this heart nature, there is the possibility of reaching Buddhahood.

=== Gelug ===
Kedrub Jé Geleg Balsang (1385–1438), one of the main disciples of Tsongkhapa, defined the tathāgatagarbha thus:

It is the emptiness of mind's being empty of being really established that is called "the naturally pure true nature of the mind." The naturally pure true nature of the mind in its phase of not being free from adventitious stains is called "sugata heart" or "naturally abiding disposition."

Brunnhölzl states that the view of Gyaltsab Darma Rinchen (1364–1432) is that buddha-nature (the tathagata heart) is "the state of a being in whom mind's emptiness is obscured, while buddhas by definition do not possess this tathagata heart."

The 14th Dalai Lama sees the buddha-nature as the "original clear light of mind", but points out that it ultimately does not exist independently, because, like all other phenomena, it is of the nature of emptiness:

Once one pronounces the words "emptiness" and "absolute", one has the impression of speaking of the same thing, in fact of the absolute. If emptiness must be explained through the use of just one of these two terms, there will be confusion. I must say this; otherwise you might think that the innate original clear light as absolute truth really exists.

=== Rimé movement ===
The Rimé movement is an ecumenical movement in Tibet which started as an attempt to reconcile the various Tibetan schools in the 19th century. In contrast to the Gelugpa, which adheres to the rang stong, "self-empty", or Prasaṅgika point of view, (Note: Which states that all existences are empty of a "self-nature") the Rimé movement supports shen tong (gzhan tong), "other-empty", an essential nature which is "pure radiant non-dual consciousness".

According to Rime scholar Jamgon Kongtrul rangtong and shentong are not ultimately different as both can reach the ultimate state in practice. However, they do differ in how they describe ultimate reality (Dharmata), since shentong describes the buddha-mind as ultimately real, while rangtong rejects this (fearing it will be confused as an atman). Kongtrul "finds the Rangtong way of presentation the best to dissolve concepts and the Shentong way the best to describe the experience."

== Modern scholarship ==
Modern scholarship points to the various possible interpretations of buddha-nature as either an essential self, as Sunyata, or as the inherent possibility of awakening.

=== Essential self ===
Shenpen Hookham, Oxford Buddhist scholar and Tibetan lama of the Shentong tradition writes of the buddha-nature or "true self" as something real and permanent, and already present within the being as uncompounded enlightenment. She calls it "the Buddha within", and writes that the Buddha, Nirvana and Buddha-wisdom can be referred to as the "True Self" (as it is done in some buddha-nature sutras). According to Hookham, in the shentong interpretation, buddha-nature is what truly exists, while not-self is what it is not.

Buddhist scholar and chronicler, Merv Fowler, writes that "the main message of the tathagatagarbha literature" is that buddha-nature really is present as "a hidden essence" within each being. According to Fowler, this view is "the idea that enlightenment, or nirvana, is not something which has to be achieved, it is something which is already there... In a way, it means that everyone is really a Buddha now."

=== Emptiness ===
According to Heng-Ching Shih, buddha-nature does not represent a substantial self (ātman). Rather, it is a positive expression of emptiness (śūnyatā), which emphasizes the potentiality to realize Buddhahood through Buddhist practices. In this view, the intention of the teaching of buddha-nature is soteriological rather than theoretical.

The influential 20th century Chinese scholar Yin Shun (印順, 1906 – 2005) drew on Chinese Madhyamaka to argue against any Yogacara influenced view that buddha-nature was an underlying permanent ground of reality and instead supported the view that buddha-nature teachings are just an expedient means. Yin Shun, drawing on his study of Indian Madhyamaka promoted the emptiness of all things as the ultimate Buddhist truth, and argued that the buddha-nature teaching was a provisional teaching taught in order to ease the fear of some Buddhists regarding emptiness as well as to attract those people who have an affinity to the idea of a Self or Brahman. Later after taking up the Buddhist path, they would be introduced to the truth of emptiness.

=== Critical Buddhist interpretation ===
Several contemporary Japanese Buddhist scholars, headed under the label Critical Buddhism (hihan bukkyō, 批判仏教), have been critical of buddha-nature thought. According to Matsumoto Shirō and Hakamaya Noriaki of Komazawa University, essentialist conceptions of buddha-nature are at odds with the fundamental Buddhist doctrine of dependent origination and non-self (anātman). The Buddha nature doctrines which they label as dhātuvāda ("substantialism", sometimes rendered "locus theory" or "topicalism" and "generative monism") is not Buddhist at all. As defined by Matsumoto, this "locus" theory or dhātuvāda which he rejects as un-buddhist is: "It is the theory that the single (eka, sama) existent "locus" (dhatu) or basis is the cause that produces the manifold phenomena or "super-loci" (dharmah)." Matsumoto further argues that: "Tathagatagarbha thought was a Buddhist version of Hindu monism, formed by the influence of Hinduism gradually introduced into Buddhism, especially after the rise of Mahayana Buddhism." Other Japanese scholars responded to this view leading to a lively debate in Japan. Takasaki Jikido, a well known authority on tathagathagarbha thought, accepted that Buddha nature theories are similar to Upanishadic theories and that dhātuvāda is an accurate expression of the structure of these doctrines, but argues that the Buddha nature texts are aware of this and that Buddha nature is not necessarily un-Buddhist or anti-Buddhist. Likewise, Hirakawa Akira, sees buddha-nature as the potential to attain Buddhahood which is not static but ever changing and argues that "dhātu" does not necessarily mean substratum (he points to some Agamas which identify dhatu with pratitya-samutpada).

Hakamaya and Matsumoto also criticised this teaching on ethical grounds. They argued that the idea that all things are already englightened had been used to justify social discrimination in Japanese Buddhism. Bodiford places their criticism in the context of the Sōtō school's response to the Buraku Liberation League, which had protested discriminatory posthumous names and temple death records.

Western scholars have reacted in different ways to this idea. Sallie B. King objects to their view, seeing the buddha-nature as a metaphor for the potential in all beings to attain Buddhahood, rather than as an ontological reality. Robert H. Sharf notes that the worries of the Critical Buddhists is nothing new, for "the early tathāgatagarbha scriptures betray a similar anxiety, as they tacitly acknowledge that the doctrine is close to, if not identical with, the heretical ātmavāda teachings of the non- Buddhists." He also notes how the Nirvāṇa-sūtra "tacitly concedes the non-Buddhist roots of the tathāgatagarbha idea." Sharf also has pointed out how certain Southern Chan masters were concerned with other interpretations of Buddha nature, showing how the tendency to critique certain views of Buddha nature is not new in East Asian Buddhism.

Peter N. Gregory has also argued that at least some East Asian interpretations of Buddha nature are equivalent to what Critical Buddhists call dhātuvāda, especially the work of Tsung-mi, who "emphasizes the underlying ontological ground on which all phenomenal appearances (hsiang) are based, which he variously refers to as the nature (hsing), the one mind (i-hsin)...". According to Dan Lusthaus, certain Chinese Buddhist ideologies which became dominant in the 8th century promoted the idea of an "underlying metaphysical substratum" or "underlying, invariant, universal metaphysical 'source'" and thus do seem to be a kind of dhātuvāda. According to Lusthaus "in early T'ang China (7th–8th century) there was a deliberate attempt to divorce Chinese Buddhism from developments in India." Lusthaus notes that the Huayen thinker Fa-tsang was influential in this theological trend who promoted the idea that true Buddhism was about comprehending the "One Mind that alone is the ground of reality" (wei- hsin).

Paul Williams too has criticised this view, saying that Critical Buddhism is too narrow in its definition of what constitutes Buddhism. According to Williams, "We should abandon any simplistic identification of Buddhism with a straightforward not-Self definition".

=== Multiple meanings ===
Sutton agrees with Williams' critique on the narrowness of any single interpretation. In discussing the inadequacy of modern scholarship on buddha-nature, Sutton states, "One is impressed by the fact that these authors, as a rule, tend to opt for a single meaning disregarding all other possible meanings which are embraced in turn by other texts". He goes on to point out that the term tathāgatagarbha has up to six possible connotations. Of these, he says the three most important are:

1. an underlying ontological reality or essential nature (tathāgata-tathatā-'vyatireka) which is functionally equivalent to a self (ātman) in an Upanishadic sense,
2. the dharmakāya which penetrates all beings (sarva-sattveṣu dharma-kāya-parispharaṇa), which is functionally equivalent to brahman in an Upanishadic sense
3. the womb or matrix of Buddhahood existing in all beings (tathāgata-gotra-saṃbhava), which provides beings with the possibility of awakening.

Of these three, Sutton claims that only the third connotation has any soteriological significance, while the other two posit buddha-nature as an ontological reality and essential nature behind all phenomena.

== See also ==
- Dhammakaya tradition
- Hongaku
- Immanence
- Kulayarāja Tantra
- One Mind
- Panentheism
- Rigpa
- Turiya
- Won Buddhism

== Sources ==
- Bielefeldt, Carl (2015), "A Discussion of Seated Zen", in Lopez, Jr., Donald S. (ed.), Buddhism in Practice: Abridged Edition, Princeton University Press
- Brown, Brian Edward (1994), The Buddha Nature. A Study of the Tathagatagarbha and Alayavijnana, Delhi: Motilal Banarsidass Publishers
- Brunnhölzl, Karl (2014), When the Clouds Part, The Uttaratantra and Its Meditative Tradition as a Bridge between Sutra and Tantra, Boston & London: Snow Lion
- Cheng Chien Bhikshu (1992), "Introduction", Sun-Face Buddha. The Teachings of Ma-tsu and the Hung-chou School of Ch'an, Asian Humanities Press
- Dolpopa (2006), Mountain Doctrine: Tibet's Fundamental Treatise on Other-Emptiness and the Buddha-Matrix, translated by Hopkins, Jeffrey, Ithaca: Snow Lion, ISBN 9781559392389, LCCN 2006006065, OCLC 64585696, OL 15616639M
- Duckworth, Douglas Samuel (2008), Mipam on Buddha-Nature: The Ground of the Nyingma Tradition, State University of New York Press, ISBN 9780791477984
- Dumoulin, Heinrich (2005a), Zen Buddhism: A History. Volume 1: India and China, World Wisdom Books, ISBN 978-0-941532-89-1
- Dumoulin, Heinrich (2005b), Zen Buddhism: A History. Volume 2: Japan, World Wisdom Books, ISBN 978-0-941532-90-7
- Gethin, Rupert (1998), Foundations of Buddhism, Oxford University Press
- Gregory, Peter N. (1991), Sudden Enlightenment Followed by Gradual Cultivation: Tsung-mi's Analysis of Mind. In: Peter N. Gregory (editor)(1991), Sudden and Gradual. Approaches to Enlightenment in Chinese Thought., Delhi: Motilal Banarsidass Publishers
- Hakeda, Yoshito S., trans. (1967), Awakening of Faith Attributed to Aśvaghoṣa, New York: Columbia University Press, archived from the original on September 11, 2013
- Harvey, Peter (1995), An introduction to Buddhism. Teachings, history and practices, Cambridge University Press
- Hookham, Shenpen (tr.) (1998), The Shrimaladevi Sutra, Oxford: Longchen Foundation
- Hopkins, Jeffrey (1999), Introduction by Jeffrey Hopkins. In: His Holiness the Dalai Lama: Kalachakra Tantra. Rite of Initiation, Wisdom Publications
- Jikido, Takasaki (2000), "The Tathagatagarbha Theory Reconsidered. Reflections on Some Recent Issues in Japanese Buddhist Studies", Japanese Journal of Religious Studies, 27 (1–2), archived from the original on July 27, 2014
- Kapleau, Philip (1989), The Three Pillars of Zen, Anchor Books, ISBN 0385260938
- Keng, Ching (2023), Toward a New Image of Paramārtha Yogācāra and Tathāgatagarbha Buddhism Revisited, Bloomsbury Academic
- Kim, Seong-Uk (2007), Understanding Tsung-Mi's view on Buddha nature
- King, Sallie B. (1991), Buddha Nature, SUNY Press, ISBN 978-0-7914-0428-7
- Lai, Whalen (2003), Buddhism in China: A Historical Survey. In Antonio S. Cua (ed.): Encyclopedia of Chinese Philosophy (PDF), New York: Routledge, archived from the original (PDF) on November 12, 2014
- Liu, Ming-Wood (1982), "The Doctrine of the Buddha-Nature in the Mahāyāna Mahāparinirvāṇa Sūtra", Journal of the International Association of Buddhist Studies, 5 (2): 63–94, archived from the original on October 16, 2013
- Lopez, Donald S. (2001), The Story of Buddhism: a concise guide to its history & teaching, HarperCollins Publishers, Inc., ISBN 0-06-069976-0
- Lusthaus, Dan (1998), "Buddhist philosophy, Chinese", in Craig, E (ed.), Routledge Encyclopedia of Philosophy, London: Routledge, archived from the original on July 16, 2014
- McRae, John (2003), Seeing Through Zen, The University Press Group Ltd
- Pettit, John Whitney (1999), Mipham's Beacon of Certainty: Illuminating the View of Dzochen, the Great Perfection, Studies in Indian and Tibetan Buddhism, Boston: Wisdom Publications, ISBN 978-0-86171-157-4, OL 41700M, Available at the Internet Archive
- Powers, J. A. (2000), Concise Encyclopaedia of Buddhism
- Rawson, Philip (1991), Sacred Tibet, London: Thames and Hudson, ISBN 0-500-81032-X
- Reeves, Gene (2008), The Lotus Sutra: A Contemporary Translation of a Buddhist Classic, Somerville, MA: Wisdom Publications, ISBN 978-0-86171-571-8
- Sasaki, Shizuka (1999), "Review Article: The Mahaparinirvana Sutra and the Origins of Mahayana Buddhism" (PDF), Japanese Journal of Religious Studies, 26 (1–2), archived from the original (PDF) on 2011-08-11
- Schaik, Sam (2004), Approaching the Great Perfection: Simultaneous and Gradual Methods of Dzogchen Practice in the Longchen Nyingtig (PDF), Wisdom Publications Inc., archived from the original (PDF) on 2014-07-14
- Sharf, Robert (2014), "Mindfullness and Mindlessness in Early Chan" (PDF), Philosophy East and West, 64 (4): 933–964, doi:10.1353/pew.2014.0074, S2CID 144208166, archived from the original (PDF) on 2017-02-23
- Shirō, Matsumoto (1997), "The Doctrine of Tathagata-garbha Is Not Buddhist", in Hubbard, Jamie; Swanson, Paul Loren (eds.), Pruning the Bodhi Tree: The Storm Over Critical Buddhism, University of Hawaii Press, doi:10.1515/9780824842697-011
- Snelling, John (1987), The Buddhist handbook. A Complete Guide to Buddhist Teaching and Practice, London: Century Paperbacks
- Sutton, Florin Giripescu (1991), Existence and Enlightenment in the Laṅkāvatāra-sūtra, SUNY Series in Buddhist Studies, Albany: State University of New York Press, ISBN 0-7914-0172-3, LCCN 89004347, OCLC 19323281, OL 2186327M
- Suzuki, D.T. (1978). The Lankavatara Sutra, Prajna Press, Boulder.
- Trainor, Kevin (2004), Buddhism: The Illustrated Guide, Oxford University Press
- Wayman, Alex and Hideko (1990), The Lion's roar of Queen Srimala, Delhi: Motilal Banarsidass Publishers
- Williams, Paul (1994), Mahayana Buddhism. The Doctrinal Foundations, Routledge
- Williams, Paul (2008), Mahayana Buddhism: The Doctrinal Foundations (2nd ed.), Routledge, OL 4151664W
- Williams, Paul (2000), Buddhist Thought, Routledge
- Williams, Paul (2002), Buddhist Thought, Taylor & Francis, Kindle Edition
- Wŏnhyo (2007), Cultivating Original Enlightenment, translated by Buswell, Robert E. Jr., University of Hawai'i Press
- Yamamoto, Kosho (1975), Mahayanism: A Critical Exposition of the Mahayana Mahaparinirvana Sutra, Karinbunko
- Zimmermann, Michael (1999), "The Tathagatagarbhasutra: Its Basic Structure and Relation to the Lotus Sutra", Annual Report of the International Research Institute for Advanced Buddhology at Soka University for the Academic Year 1998 (PDF), Tokyo: The International Research Institute for Advanced Buddhology, Soka University, pp. 143–168, archived from the original (PDF) on October 8, 2011
- Zimmermann, Michael (2002), "A Buddha Within: The Tathāgatagarbhasūtra" (PDF), Biblotheca Philologica et Philosophica Buddhica, VI, Tokyo: The International Research Institute for Advanced Buddhology, Soka University, archived from the original (PDF) on November 11, 2013
