= Young Township =

Young Township may refer to the following places in the United States:

- Young Township, Boone County, Arkansas
- Young Township, Dickey County, North Dakota, Dickey County, North Dakota
- Young Township, Indiana County, Pennsylvania
- Young Township, Jefferson County, Pennsylvania

See also

- Young (disambiguation)
- Young America Township (disambiguation)
