= Janga =

Janga may refer to:

== People ==
- Janga Augustus Kowo (born 1974), Liberian politician
- Chendupatla Janga Reddy (born 1935), Indian politician
- Rangelo Janga (born 1992), Curaçaoan footballer
- Rilove Janga (born 1987), Bonairean footballer

== Places ==
- Janga, a district in Paulista, Brazil
- Janga (mountain), a summit in the Greater Caucasus Mountain Range
- Janga, Kerman, a village in Kerman Province, Iran
- Janga, Tanzania, a ward in Pwani Region
- Türkmenbaşy şäherçesi, a town in Turkmenistan known as Janga until 1993

== See also ==
- Jangam (disambiguation)
- Jenga, a game
- Junga (disambiguation)
- Jang (disambiguation)
