= Jung (disambiguation) =

Carl Gustav Jung (1875–1961) was the founder of analytical psychology.

Jung may also refer to:

- Jung (surname)
- Jung (Korean given name)
- JUNG, the Java Universal Network/Graph Framework
- Jung (1996 film), an Indian Hindi-language film
- Jung (2000 film), an Indian Hindi-language film
- Jung, Victoria, Australia
- Rehan Nazar Jung, fictional ISI agent and father of Zoya Nazar in the Indian YRF Spy Universe, portrayed by Aamir Bashir

== See also ==
- Arnold Jung Lokomotivfabrik, German locomotive manufacturer
- Jeong (surname)
- Jung-Kellogg Library, at Missouri Baptist University
- Salar Jung Museum, in India
- Xirong (Hsi-jung), ancient barbarian peoples
- Jang (disambiguation)
- Junga (disambiguation)
- Young (disambiguation)
- Yung (disambiguation)
- Djong (ship)
