= Wonhyo =

Korean buddhist philosopher (617–686)

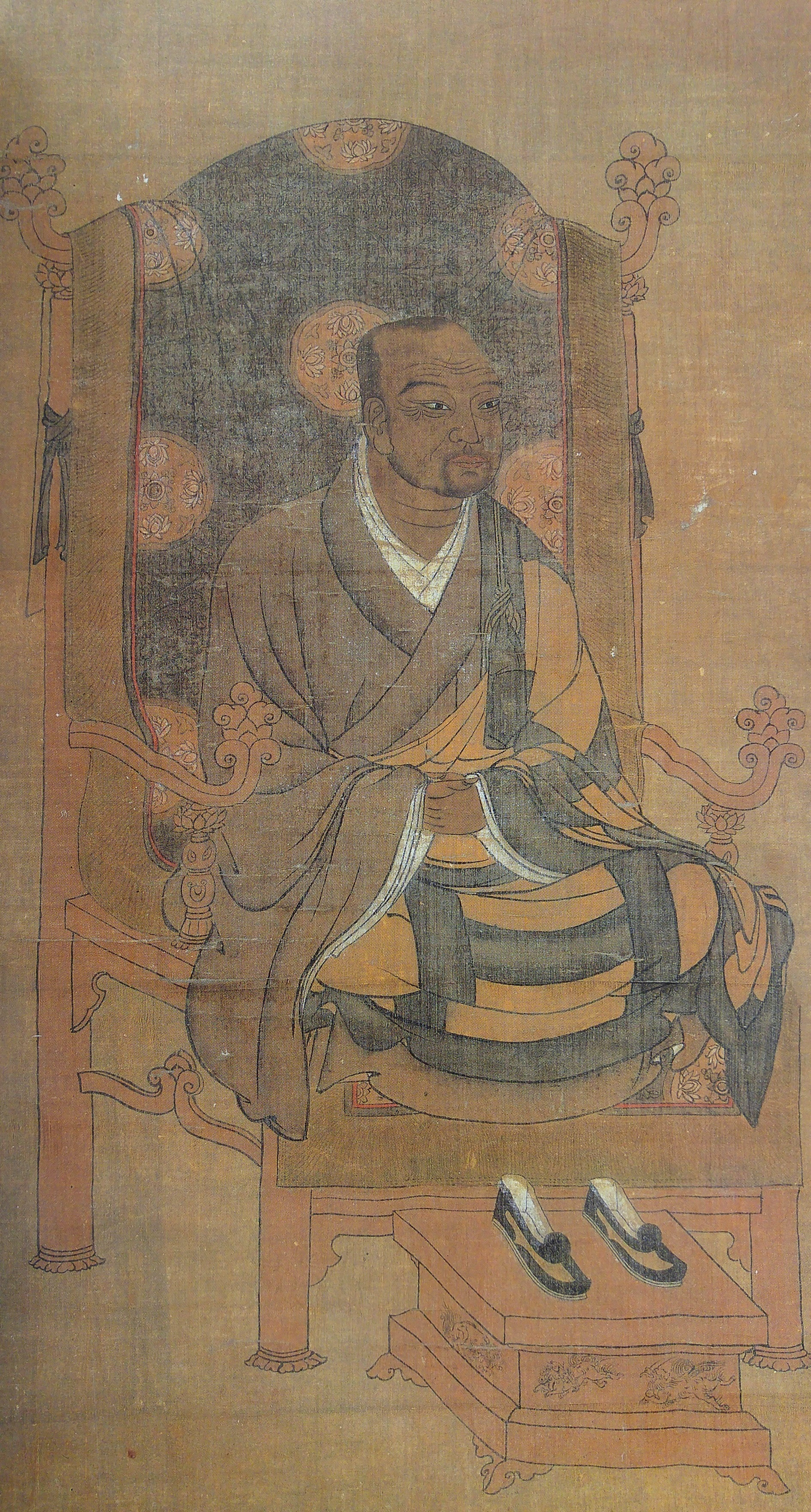

Religious life
- Religion: Buddhism

Korean name
- Hangul: 설사
- Hanja: 薛思
- RR: Seol Sa
- MR: Sŏl Sa

Childhood name
- Hangul: 서당, 신당
- Hanja: 誓幢, 新幢
- RR: Seodang, Sindang
- MR: Sŏdang, Sindang

Dharma name
- Hangul: 원효
- Hanja: 元曉
- RR: Wonhyo
- MR: Wŏnhyo

Wŏnhyo (Korean: 원효; Chinese: 元曉; 617 – 686, meaning: "Dawnbreak") was one of the most important philosophers and commentators in East Asian Buddhism and the most prolific scholar in Korean Buddhism.

As one of the most eminent scholar-monks in East Asian history, his extensive literary output runs to over 80 works in 240 fascicles. His most influential commentaries are those on buddha-nature texts like the *Vajrasamādhisūtra, the Awakening of Faith, and the Mahāparinirvāṇasūtra. These works became classics widely respected throughout Korea, China and Japan.

Wonhyo's work was foundational for all of Korean Buddhism and also influenced Buddhism in other East Asian nations. Chinese masters who were heavily influenced by Wonhyo include Huayan masters like Fazang, Li Tongxuan, and Chengguan. He was

The Japanese monks Gyōnen, Zenshu and Joto of the Kegon school were also influenced by him.

== Biography ==
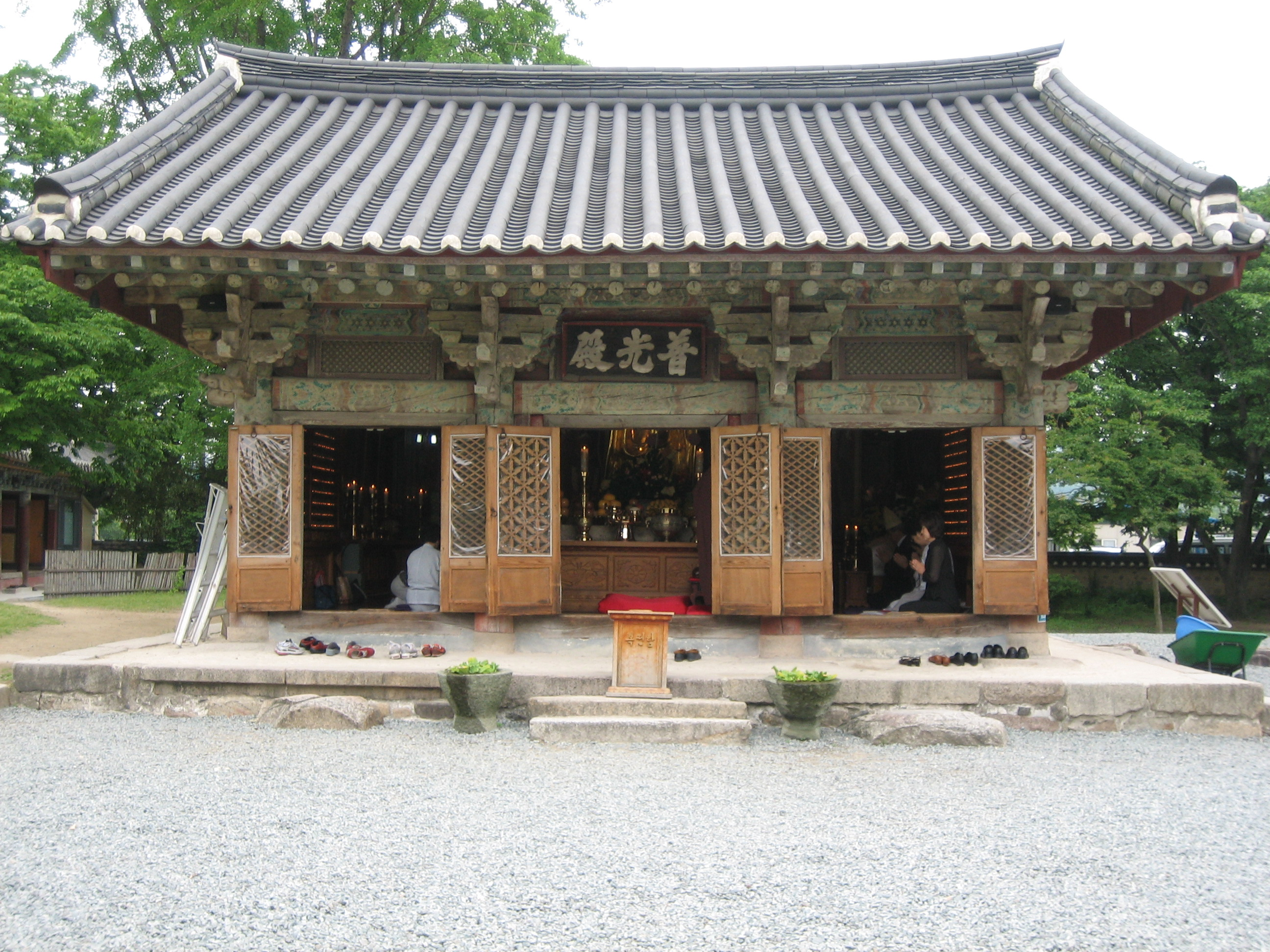
Bogwangjeon hall at Bunhwangsa, Gyeongju which is a dedicated shrine to Wonhyo.

Wonhyo was born in Amnyang (押梁), (modern Gyeongsan, South Korea). Wonhyo spent the earlier part of his career as a monk studying under various Korean Buddhist teachers and living in Hwangnyongsa Temple.

One of the most famous episodes of Wonhyo's life, found in various hagiographical accounts, is the story of his aborted attempt to travel to Tang China to study the Yogācāra teachings of the school of Xuanzang (602–664). The hagiographies of Wohnyo explain that what kept him from leaving Korea was an enlightenment experience.

The story says that in 661 Wonhyo and a close friend called Uisang (625–702) were traveling to China, when, somewhere in the region of Baekje, the pair were caught in a heavy downpour and forced to take shelter in what they believed to be an earthen sanctuary. During the night Wonhyo was overcome with thirst, and reaching out grasped what he perceived to be a gourd, and drinking from it was refreshed with a draught of cool, refreshing water. Upon waking the next morning, however, the companions discovered much to their amazement that their shelter was in fact an ancient tomb littered with human skulls, and the vessel from which Wonhyo had drunk was a human skull full of brackish water. Startled by the experience of believing that a gruesome liquid was a refreshing treat, Wonhyo was astonished at the power of the human mind to transform reality. As he reflected on this, he had a deep insight into how the world is a creation of mind and directly experienced the Yogacara principle of "mind-only" (cittamatra). Due to this insight, he did not feel it necessary to travel to China since all phenomena are ultimately not outside our own mind.

The sources also state that at that time he proclaimed: "Because of the arising of thought, various phenomena arise; since thought ceases, a cave and a grave are not two. Since there are no dharmas outside of the mind, why should I seek them somewhere? I will not go to the Tang." This statement refers to a passage in the Awakening of Faith.

Wonhyo left the priesthood after an affair with a princess named Yoseok. He then turned to spreading Buddhism among the common people as a layman, calling himself a "Layman of Minor Lineage." He was known not only for his extensive writings and commentaries, but also for his unconventional behaviors. Wonhyo became famous for visiting towns and villages and performing songs and dances to teach Buddhism. He is also said to have visited bars and brothels, played the lute and slept in the homes of common people. While the orthodox Buddhist tradition discouraged such behaviors, his songs and dances were seen as upaya, or skillful means, meant to help save all sentient beings. At other times he lived alone in the mountains or along rivers, wrote various works and gave lectures on Buddhism and taught the people to chant the Buddha's name.

Because of this aspect of his character, Wonhyo ended up becoming a popular folk hero in Korea. Wohnyo later married and had a son, Seol Chong, who is considered to be one of the great Confucian scholars of Silla.

Wonhyo died while staying at Hyeolsa in 686 at the age of 70. His remains were interred by his son at Bunhwangsa.

=== Influence ===
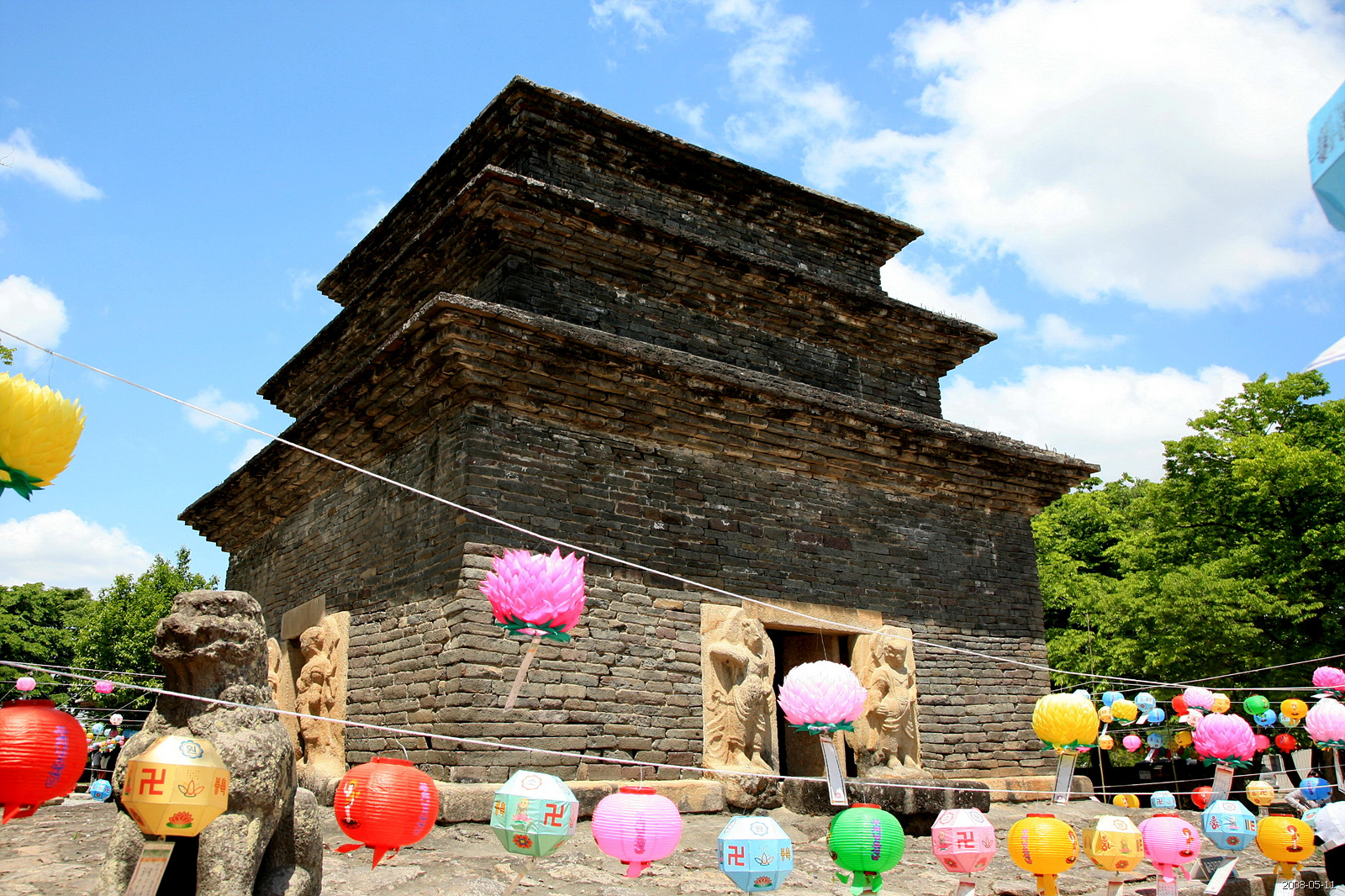
Bunhwangsa Pagoda around Buddha's Birthday.

Wŏnhyo was one of the three great Buddhist scholars of the Silla Period, alongside Kyŏnghŭng and Taehyŏn. Wŏnhyo's work influenced all of East Asian Buddhism. His commentaries on various texts were widely respected by Buddhist scholars in Korea, China and Japan. As noted by Hee-Sung Keel:

Wŏnhyo, commonly regarded as the greatest thinker in Korean Buddhism, was a prolific writer who produced no less than eighty-six works, of which twenty-three are extant either completely or partially. By his time, most of the important sūtras and treatises had flowed into Korea from China, and they were causing a great deal of confusion for Silla Buddhists, as they had for the Chinese. It was Wŏnhyo's genius to interpret all of the texts known to him in a way that would reveal their underlying unity of truth without sacrificing the distinctive message of each text. He found his hermeneutical key in the famous Mahāyāna text, the Awakening of Faith (Dasheng Qixin Lun).

Wohnyo's collaboration with Uisang directly led to the establishment of the influential Hwaeom (Korean Huayan) school as a major stream of thought in Korea.

Wohnyo is also thought to have founded Korea's lone riverside temple, Silleuksa, in the late 600s. While Wonhyo was in Bunhwangsa (in modern Guhwang-dong, Gyeongju), he wrote a number of books. For such strong association with Wonhyo, a research center and a shrine named Bogwangjeon hall dedicated to Wonhyo's legacy are located in Bunhwangsa.

== Philosophy ==
Wonhyo's career last from the end of Korea's Three Kingdoms era to the dawn of the Unified Silla kingdom (668–935). Wonhyo extensive work was vital for the reception of Mahayana Buddhism in Korea and as such he is a central figure in the development of Korean Buddhism. Wonhyo was especially influenced by Buddha-nature literature, East Asian Yogācāra, Huayan thought and the philosophy of Essence-Function (Chinese: 體用). His work is widely cited by later scholarly works from China, Korea and Japan.

In his extensive scholarly works, composed mostly as commentaries and a few treatises, he developed a unified Mahayana Buddhist philosophy drawing on all the different Chinese Buddhist traditions (including Sutra Studies, Pure Land, Huayan, Sanlun, Yogacara, Vinaya, Logic).

Wonhyo never associated himself with any specific Buddhist tradition and drew on a wide variety of Mahayana sources. Wonhyo's main focus was on Yogacara and Buddha-nature texts like the *Vajrasamādhisūtra, the Awakening of Faith, and the Mahāparinivāṇasūtra. His most influential writings include commentaries on these three texts, all of which were widely respected throughout East Asia.

=== Harmonization of disputes ===
A key project of Wonhyo was to harmonize the various Buddhist teachings and traditions all of which he saw as non-contradictory. As such, the 'harmonization of disputes' (hwajaeng; 和諍) is central for Wonhyo's philosophical outlook. Wohnyo's works often seek to harmonize the various seemingly contradictory Buddhist teachings found in all of the Buddhist texts by showing how they are based on a single deeper principle.

Wonhyoʼs harmonization methodology is found in almost all his works and often expresses itself in a deep investigation of the root of seemingly conflicting Buddhist doctrines and positions. Wonhyo's generally seeks to show that these variant doctrines often arise from things like the background, biases and motivations of particular authors of doctrinal positions. This approach to doctrinal harmonization is quite different than that of most Chinese commentators who instead rely on hierarchical doctrinal classification schemas (Chinese: panjiao, Korean: pangyo 判教) which placed only some teachings at the top of a doctrinal hierarchy. Instead of creating a hierarchy, Wonhyoʼs method seeks to show how the various Buddhist teachings are mutually interconnected in a harmonious whole. As such, Wonhyo criticized thinkers who hierarchically classificed the Dharma like Zhiyi. Wohnyo writes:

You should know that the Buddha's meaning is deep and profound without limit. So if you want [like Chih-i] to divide the scriptural meaning into four teachings, or limit the Buddha's intent with five periods, then this is like using a snail shell to scoop out the ocean, or trying to see the heavens through a narrow tube.

Wonhyo's "Hwajaeng theory" (harmonization of disputes) was summarized in his work Ten Approaches to the Reconciliation of Doctrinal Disputes (Simmun hwajaeng non 十門和諍論, 십문화쟁론). Wonhyo often traces the origin of intra-Buddhist doctrinal conflict to a misunderstanding of linguistic conventions like difference and sameness, and affirmation and negation. Ultimately, Wohnyo's analysis of conflicting interpretations of Buddhist doctrine and doctrinal disputes is thus centered on language and on the relationship between names and meanings (which are neither identical nor remain static/fixed). According to Wohnyo, disputes among Buddhist schools often arise due to grasping at literal meaning of words. For him, all Buddhist teachings point to a single truth. As such, Wohnyo writes: "If you take a sentence literally, it could be disagreed with. If you focus on its meaning, you could understand it."

In his Reconciliation of Doctrinal Disputes, Wonhyo proceeds to draw on numerous Buddhist philosophical systems and on the Mahayana sutras like the Lotus Sutra, Nirvana Sutra and Prajñāpāramitā to resolve doctrinal conflicts and demonstrate the compatibility of all of Mahayana Buddhist teachings. For Wohnyo, all Mahayana doctrines are metaphors which point to the same ultimate truth.

Another element of his harmonization method was to draw on Huayan metaphysics of interpenetration to demonstrate how all Buddhist teachings are ultimately in a state of non-obstruction. Thus one can say that Wohnyo saw all Buddhist doctrines as a harmonious interpenetrating reality, and as such he often called his philosophy "interpenetrated Buddhism" (t'ong pulgyo, 通佛教).

=== One-mind and essence-function thought ===
Wonhyo's philosophy is centered on the "One Mind theory" (Ch: yixinshixiang, 一心思想; 일심사상). Wŏnhyo's worldview sees the one mind as the ultimate reality which manifests in two aspects:

- “true-thusness”, which is intrinsically pure and unchanging Thusness (Tathātā, 眞如), the ultimate reality, the true nature of the mind, which is without concepts or discrimination, without arising or ceasing.
- “arising-and-ceasing”, which is impure, impermanent, subject to cause and effect and manifests as all forms of samsara and delusion. This is the mind of everyday reality, the mind of suffering (dukkha) and the mind of the six realms.

As such, the One Mind is the non-dual source of all phenomena, the source of both samsara and nirvana, and it contains both purity and ignorance and defilement.

The one mind (一心) theory is drawn from the influential treatise The Mahayana Awakening of Faith (大乘起信論; pinyin: Dàshéng Qǐxìn Lùn) and is discussed in Wonhyo's numerous commentaries. This doctrine is a synthesis of the Mahayana doctrines of the ālayavijñāna (storehouse consciousness) and buddha-nature. The importance of the Awakening of Faith's theories for Wonhyo is proved by the fact that he wrote nine commentaries on this text (only two are extant). The Awakening of Faith's One Mind teaching is one of the central principles which Wonhyo uses to harmonize the various Buddhist teachings.

Another important and related doctrine which Wonhyo relies and expands upon is the Chinese theory of essence-function (體用, Chinese pinyin: tǐ yòng, Korean: che-yong) which is also found in the Awakening of Faith. Essence here refers to pure Suchness, the ultimate reality, i.e. the One Mind; while function refers to all relative phenomena (dharmas). These two aspects are seen by Wonhyo as non-dual, as part of a harmonious whole.

=== Original enlightenment and Buddhist practice ===
Wonhyo also wrote on and developed the related theory of original enlightenment (Chinese: 本覺; pinyin: běnjué, Korean: bongak), which sees enlightenment as immanent in the mind, though it has to be discovered through purifying the mind and practicing the six paramitas. Indeed, for Wohnyo, the ultimate principle (Dharma), the essence or One Mind, is nothing but the principle of enlightenment itself which penetrates the minds of all sentient beings.

According to Wohnyo, liberation or enlightenment means to truly know that all phenomena are the One Mind which is already immanent within the mind of sentient beings. It is thus to understand that we already are enlightenment. As such, enlightenment is also called "returning to the original source". Thus, for Wohnyo, nothing new is attainment in enlightenment, one merely recognizes what is already there.

How does one reach or return to the original enlightenment? For Wohnyo, this happens through the process of "actualizing enlightenment" through which a Buddhist practitioner can move away from the state of non-enlightenment towards the enlightened source (though in reality, these two states are non-dual, not completely separate, but are like waves and the ocean). To actualize enlightenment and let go of ignorance and duality, religious practice is required. As one practices, original enlightenment reveals itself as ignorance and the defilements are gradually eliminated. Indeed, it is through the power of original enlightenment itself that the mind is purified in the process of actualizing enlightenment.

Wonhyo's held that it was possible to apply these deep principles in one's personal everyday life. As such, he met with commoners and elites alike and taught people according to their needs. For the commoners he generally taught a flexible teaching which included Buddhist metaphysics and the simple Pure Land practice of reciting the name of Amitabha with a sincere mind intent on bodhicitta.

== Works ==
Wonhyo was a very prolific author with a broad mastery of the Buddhist canon. He is said to have composed 80 texts in over 200 fascicles. Only twenty two are extant. As noted by Charles Muller "except for the works of the extraordinarily prolific translators such as Kumārajīva (344–413) and Hsüan-tsang (596–664), this is probably the largest literary output by a single scholar in East Asian Buddhist history."

His life's work includes writings on all the key Mahayana Buddhist topics of the day, including Prajñāpāramitā, Madhyamaka, Nirvana Sutra, Buddha-nature, Lotus Sutra, Vinaya, Pure Land, Yogācāra, State Protection, Huayan, and Buddhist Logic. Most of Wonhyo's writings are commentaries on classic Mahayana Buddhist works. His commentaries are often holistic ones, which, according to Robert Buswell, "seek to demonstrate, first, how each section, part, and division of the scripture resonates with the rest of the sections, parts, and divisions of the text; and second, how the text that is the focus of his commentary reticulates within the entire fabric of the Buddhist scriptural teachings...he attempts nothing less than to demonstrate that the entirety of Mahayana Buddhism is revealed in the single sūtra that is the focus of his exegesis."

Some of his key texts include:

- Doctrinal Essentials of the Great Perfection of Wisdom Sūtra (Daehyedo gyeong jong-yo 大慧度經宗要)
- Doctrinal Essentials of the Lotus Sutra (Beophwa jong-yo 法華宗要)
- Expository Notes to the Awakening of Mahāyāna Faith
- Praise of Amitabhaʼs Realization of His Nature
- System of the Two Hindrances
- Commentary to the Awakening of Mahāyāna Faith
- Doctrinal Essentials of the Sutra on the Ascension of Maitreya
- Commentary on the Discrimination between the Middle and the Extremes
- Doctrinal Essentials of the Great Perfection of Wisdom Sūtra
- Critique of Inference
- Doctrinal Essentials of the Sutra of Immeasurable Life (Muryangsugyeong jong-yo 無量壽經宗要)
- Doctrinal Essentials of the Nirvana Sutra (Yeolban jong-yo 涅槃宗要)
- Exposition of the Vajrasamādhi-sūtra.
- Commentary on the Flower Ornament Sutra (Hwaeom- gyeong so byeong seo 華嚴經疏并序)
- Doctrinal Essentials of the Flower Ornament Sutra
- Commentary on the Amitâbha Sūtra (Amitagyeong so, 阿彌陀經疏)
- Personal Notes on the Fundamentals of Bodhisattva Precepts in the Brahmāʼs Net Sutra
- Essentials of Observing and Transgressing the Code of Bodhisattva Precepts

Wonhyo's twenty-three extant works are currently in the process of being translated into English as a joint project between Dongguk University and Stony Brook University. The University of Hawaii Press is publishing them in five volumes. There are currently two volumes of this project published:

- Wonhyo's Philosophy of Mind, Edited by A. Charles Muller and Cuong T. Nguyen (2012)
- Cultivating Original Enlightenment: Wonhyo's Exposition of the Vajrasamadhi-Sutra, Translated with an introduction by Robert E. Buswell Jr. (2007)

== Legacy ==
The International Taekwon-Do Federation teul Won-Hyo is named in Wonhyo's honor. This pattern consists of 28 movements.

The World Taekwondo Federation has a Hyeong or pattern named Ilyeo for 9th Dan black belt which means the thought of the Buddhist priest of Silla Dynasty, Wonhyo.

Wonhyo Bridge across the Han River in Seoul is named after him.

=== Wonhyo Pilgrimage Project ===
In 2011, retired Canadian journalist Tony MacGregor walked across the Korean Peninsula in an attempt to understand the awakening experience of Wonhyo. Legend says that Wonhyo walked across the peninsula in the 7th century and found enlightenment in a cave on the western side of the peninsula. MacGregor's journey, which involved staying at mountain monasteries and talking to monks, was the first in over 1,000 years to honor Wonhyo's accomplishment. A documentary film of the walk was completed and a project to establish a permanent pilgrimage trail is currently being developed.
