= Yung =

Yung may refer to:

- Yung (surname), a Chinese surname
- Yung Joc (born Jasiel Robinson in 1983), an American rapper
- Yung Wun (born James Carlton Anderson in 1982), an American rapper
- Yung Berg (born Christian Ward in 1985), an American rapper
- Yung L.A. (born Leland Austin), an American rapper
- Yung (born 1988), band member of Cali Swag District
- Yung Lean (born Jonatan Leandoer Håstad), a Swedish rapper
- Yung Gravy (born Matthew Raymond Hauri in 1996), an American rapper

== See also ==
- Yong (disambiguation)
- Young (disambiguation)
- Jung (disambiguation)
