= Jangam (disambiguation) =

Jangam refers to a Shaiva order of wandering religious monks. Jangam may also refer to:

- Jangam station, northern terminus of the Seoul Subway Line 7
- Bharat Jangam (born 1947) Nepali novelist and freelance journalist

== See also ==
- Janga (disambiguation)
- Jang (disambiguation)
