= Yong (Chinese forename) =

Yong (Chinese: 勇) is a common Chinese name. From Chinese 勇 (yǒng) means "brave" or 永 (yǒng) meaning "perpetual, eternal".

== Notable people from China with the single-syllable given name Yong ==
=== Historical figures ===
- Murong Yong was the last emperor of the Xianbei state Western Yan.
- Li Yong (prince) (died 838), Tang Dynasty prince.
- Li Yong (chancellor) (died 820), Tang Dynasty chancellor.

=== Politics and society ===
- Zhang Yong (politician) a former director of the China Food and Drug Administration.
- Zhang Yong (restaurateur) a Chinese billionaire restaurateur, founder of Haidilao.
- Li Yong (politician) (born 1951), Chinese politician.
- Li Yong (television host) (1968–2018), Chinese television host.
- Eric Xu or Xu Yong (徐勇, born 1964), co-founder of Baidu

=== TV personalities ===
- Li Yong (television host) (1968–2018), Chinese television host

=== Sports ===
- Zhang Yong (snooker player) Chinese snooker player.

=== Scholars ===
- Xu Yong (historian) (徐勇, born 1949)

=== Military ===
- Xu Yong (general) (许勇; born 1959)
