= Youngs =

Youngs can refer to:

People:

- Ben Youngs (born 1989), English rugby union player
- Elaine Youngs (born 1970), American beach volleyball player
- Jenny Owen Youngs (born 1981), American singer-songwriter
- Jim Youngs (born 1956), American actor who appeared in such films as The Wanderers and Footloose
- John Youngs (minister) (c. 1598–1672), Puritan minister who founded Southold, New York
- John E. Youngs (1883–1970), American politician
- John William Theodore Youngs (1910–1970), American mathematician
- Nick Youngs (born 1959), former English rugby union footballer
- Richard Youngs (born 1966), British musician
- Ross Youngs (1897–1927), American Major League Baseball outfielder
- Samuel Youngs (1760–1839), American schoolteacher who served as inspiration for the character Ichabod Crane
- Thomas Youngs, multiple people

Places:

- Youngs, California, a former town in El Dorado County
- Youngs Bay, Oregon
- Youngs River, tributary of the Columbia River in northwest Oregon
- Youngs Siding, Western Australia, in the City of Albany, Australia

Companies

- Young's, British pub chain
- Young's Seafood, British fish company

== See also ==
- Young's modulus
- Young's rule
- Young's syndrome
