= Ti (philosophy) =

Ti (simplified Chinese: 体; traditional Chinese: 體; pinyin: tǐ; Wade–Giles: t'i) is the Chinese word for substance or body. The philosopher Zhang Zai described the ti as "that which is never absent, that is, through all transformations."

In Neo-Confucianism, this concept is often associated with yong, which means "use" or "function." Such function or how the yong of a thing is its activity or its response when stimulated underscores the link. Like the concepts of nei-wai (inner-outer) and ben-mo (root-branch), ti-yong is central to Chinese metaphysics. The link was adopted in order to manifest the actual meaning of the two truths and the relationship between them.
