= Tiyong =

Concept in Chinese and Buddhist Philosophy

Chinese name
- Traditional Chinese: 體用
- Simplified Chinese: 体用
- Hanyu Pinyin: Tǐyòng

Korean name
- Hangul: 체용
- Hanja: 體用
- Revised Romanization: Cheyong
- McCune–Reischauer: Ch'eyong

Japanese name
- Kyūjitai: 體用
- Shinjitai: 体用
- Romanization: Taiyū

Tiyong or essence-function is a key concept in Chinese philosophy and East Asian Buddhism. It is a compound of two terms: "essence" (Chinese: 體; pinyin: tǐ), the absolute reality, cause, or source of all things, and "function" (yòng, 用), the manifestations of ti, which make up the impermanent and relative concrete reality. Ti and yong do not represent two separate things, but aspects of the same non-dual process.

The meanings of the term essence-function can also expand to include the following polarities: internal/external, root/branch, hidden/manifest, stillness/movement, fundamental/superficial. The basic idea can be found in ancient Chinese texts like the I Ching and Mencius. The term was widely adopted by Chinese Buddhists and became a major theme in Chinese Buddhism. In the East Asian Buddhist context, the term was further expanded and linked to classic Buddhist ideas and polarities like: nirvaṇa and saṃsāra, Buddhahood and sentient being, original enlightenment and initial enlightenment, ultimate truth and relative truth, principle and phenomena (理事), and the One Mind and its functions (in the Awakening of Faith in the Mahayana). Essence-function thought remains an important doctrinal theme in East Asian Buddhism.

== Etymology ==
- Essence, 體 (ti), Korean: che (체), Japanese: tai. This character can mean: body; shape, form; entity, unit; style, fashion, system; substance, essence; theory (as opposed to practice). (Note: Sheik, Adam (2008). 體 or Tai. CantoDict v1.3.16. Source: (accessed: December 20, 2008))
- Function, or Application 用 (yong), Korean: 용 (yong), Japanese: yū. This can mean: use, employ, apply, operate; exert; effect; finance; need; eat, drink. (Note: Sheik, Adam (2008). 用 or Jung. CantoDict v1.3.16. Source: (accessed: December 20, 2008))

== Meaning ==
| Absolute | Relative |
|---|---|
| Straight | Bend |
| One | Manifold |
| Identical | Different |
| Universal | Particular |
| Noumenal | Phenomenal |
| Li | Shih |
| Absolute | Appearance |
| Dark | Light |
| Ri | Ji |
| Chang | P'ien |
| Real | Apparent |
| Ideal | Actual |

Essence is Absolute Reality, the fundamental "cause" or origin, while Function is manifest or relative reality, the discernible effects or manifestations of Essence. According to Buddhologist A. Charles Muller:

T'i originally means body or substance, and refers to the more internal, essential, hidden, important aspects of a thing. Yung refers to the more external, superficial, obvious, and functional aspects of something. But these must be clearly understood to be aspects--ways of seeing a single thing, and not two separate existences.

Thus, the term Essence-Function describes the interplay between the two: although Absolute Reality is the ultimate reality, the relative reality nevertheless also exists, as is evident from concrete reality. In East Asian Buddhism, the idea became closely connected to the Indian idea of the two truths (relative and ultimate). The relationship between these two principles is expressed in such Chan / Zen schemata as the Five Ranks and the Oxherding Pictures. Various terms are used for "absolute" and "relative".

The tree forms a metaphor for Essence-Function, with the roots being Essence and the branches being Function. As such, Chinese scholars also made use of equivalent terminology, such as pen-mo ("roots and branches").

In Chinese philosophy, a major application of tiyong is to understand the human mind or spirit (sheng) as "essence," and individual words, thoughts and actions as the function. In Confucian texts, the concept is applied to the fundamental quality of ren ("humanity," "benevolence") which expresses itself in various "functions", like as propriety (li) and filial piety (xiao). The concept can also be applied to Chinese cosmology, where the first principle or ultimate ground of being (Tao, Li, Taiji, Heaven, etc.) is the essence, and the myriad phenomena in the world, the "ten thousand things" (like yin and yang, the Five Phases etc.), are the function.

According to Sung-bae Park the concept of essence-function is used by East Asian Buddhists "to show a non-dualistic and non-discriminate nature in their enlightenment experience," but does not exclude notions of subjectivity and objectivity. According to Sung-bae Park, the terms "essence" and "function" can also be rendered as "body" and "the body's functions," which is a more personal and less abstract expression of nonduality.

== Overview ==
=== China ===
According to Charles Muller, essence-function thought "has its origins deep in the recesses of early Chou thought in such seminal texts as the Book of Odes, Analects, I ching and Tao te ching, became formally defined and used with regularity in the exegetical writings of Confucian/Neo-Taoist scholars of the Latter Han and afterward."

Tiyong thought further developed in the Wei (220–265) – Jin (266–420) period of Chinese history, when "Unification of the Three Teachings" ideology was dominant, striving for a theoretical reconciliation of Confucianism, Daoism, and Buddhism. The Tiyong concept was first known as pen-mo ("primary-last" or "primary-subordinate"), and developed into tiyong. In the initial development of the theory, "thinkers considered one of the three philosophies as 'the primary' or 'ti' and the others as 'the last' or 'yong,' insisting that their own philosophy was superior to the others." However, although the theory was used to arrange the three teachings hierarchically, it also confirmed their inner unity.

The notions appear already in the Zhongyong (Doctrine of the Mean) attributed to Zi Si (481–402 BCE), the grandson of Confucius. The first philosopher to systematically use the tiyong schema was Wang Bi (226–249) in his commentary to Daodejing, chapter 22, when he discussed the metaphysical relation between non-being (wu) and being (you). Subsequently, the notion has been borrowed from the Neo-Daoist philosophy to other schools of Chinese philosophy, including Hua-yen and other schools of Buddhism, and the Neo-Confucianism of Cheng Yi and Zhu Xi, and served as a basic tool of interpretation. With these schools, it has travelled to Korea, Japan, and Vietnam, and has been developed there.

The concept developed further with the introduction of Buddhism in China, adapting Buddhist philosophy to a Chinese frame of reference. One of the core Madhyamaka Buddhist doctrines is the Two Truths Doctrine, which says that there is a relative truth and an ultimate truth. In Madhyamaka, the two truths are two epistemological truths: two different ways to look at reality. Phenomenal reality is relatively real or true: one can make factual statements about concrete or manifest reality, but those statements have a relative trueness, since everything that exists changes, and is bound to dissolve again. Ultimately, everything is empty, sunyata, of an underlying unchanging essence. Sunyata itself is also "empty," 'the emptiness of emptiness', which means that sunyata itself does not constitute a higher or ultimate "essence" or "reality. (Note: See also Susan Kahn, The Two Truths of Buddhism and The Emptiness of Emptiness) The Prajnaparamita-sutras and Madhyamaka emphasized the non-duality of form and emptiness: form is emptiness, emptiness is form, as the Heart Sutra says.

When Buddhism was introduced to China, the two truths doctrine was a point of confusion. Chinese thinking took this to refer to two ontological truths: reality exists of two levels, a relative level and an absolute level. The doctrines of Buddha-nature and Sunyata were understood as akin to Dao and the Taoist non-being. It took the Chinese world several centuries to realize that sunyata has another meaning.

Based on their understanding of the Mahayana Mahaparinirvana Sutra, the Chinese supposed that the teaching of the Buddha-nature was, as stated by that sutra, the final Buddhist teaching, and that there is an essential truth above sunyata and the two truths. The idea that ultimate reality is present within the daily world of relative reality melded well with Chinese culture, which emphasized the mundane world and society. But this does not tell how the absolute is present in the relative world:

To deny the duality of samsara and nirvana, as the Perfection of Wisdom does, or to demonstrate logically the error of dichotomizing conceptualization, as Nagarjuna does, is not to address the question of the relationship between samsara and nirvana -or, in more philosophical terms, between phenomenal and ultimate reality [...] What, then, is the relationship between these two realms?

The Awakening of Mahayana Faith, a key text in Chinese Buddhism, also employs Essence-Function and combines it with Yogacara, Buddha-nature and Madhyamaka philosophy, to produce a unique worldview. Many modern scholars have now concluded that this text was composed in China since it shows the influence of essence-function thought.

The view of essence-function was soon adopted by Chan Buddhists, and makes an appearance in the Platform Sutra. East Asian Mahāyāna philosophers who were influenced by the essence-function discourse include such luminaries as Fazang, Zongmi, and the Chan masters of the Five houses of Tang dynasty Chan.

Tiyong thought was employed by Confucian reformers of the Self-Strengthening Movement at the end of the Qing dynasty's (1644 to 1912) rule in China, in the phrase "Chinese learning for essence, Western learning for application". (Note: simplified Chinese: 中学为体，西学为用; traditional Chinese: 中學為體，西學為用; pinyin: zhōngxué wéi tǐ, xīxué wéi yòng) The belief was that China should maintain its own Confucian style of learning to keep the "essence" of society, while at the same time using Western learning for "practical application" in developing its infrastructure and economy.

=== Korean Buddhism ===
Essence-Function is an essential element in the philosophy of Wonhyo (617–686 CE). Wonhyo developed tiyong theory into its most influential form in his commentary on the Ta ch'eng ch'i hsin lun (Treatise on the Awakening of Mahayana Faith). This scripture proclaims the non-duality of the phenomenal or mundane world and the tathagata-garbha. Wonhyo saw the Treatise's treatment of tiyong as a way of harmonizing the thought of Madhyamika and Yogacara. For Wonhyo, t'i corresponds to Madhyamika's ultimate truth and yung to its conventional truth, and these, in turn, are the two gates of Yogacara's one-mind.

Chinul (1158–1210) and Kihwa (1376–1433) also employed and developed this idea of Essence-Function in their writings in particular ways. Wonch'uk (613–696) employed the conceptual and analytical tool, Essence-Function, as an exegetical, hermeneutical, and syncretic device.

=== Linguistics ===
The concept is also employed in Korean and Japanese linguistics. Words that do not change their form, mostly nouns, which are not inflected in Korean and Japanese, are referred to as 'essence' words (Japanese: 體言; Korean: 體言), while verbs and most adjectives, which are highly inflected in those languages, are referred to as 'function' words (Japanese: 用言; Korean: 用言).

== See also ==
Buddhism

- Gankyil
- Korean Buddhism
- Korean philosophy
- Sentient beings (Buddhism)
- Store consciousness
- Five Ranks

Christianity

- Essence–energies distinction

== Sources ==
=== Printed sources ===
- Dumoulin, Heinrich (2005a), Zen Buddhism: A History. Volume 1: India and China, World Wisdom Books, ISBN 978-0-941532-89-1
- Garfield, Jay (2002), Empty Words: Buddhist Philosophy and Cross-cultural Interpretation, Oxford University Press
- Grosnick, William, H. (1989), "The Categories of T'i, Hsiang, and Yung: Evidence that Paramārtha Composed the Awakening of Faith", Journal of the International Association of Buddhist Studies, 12 (1): 65–92, archived from the original on 2014-01-12
- Kasulis, Thomas P. (2003), Ch'an Spirituality. In: Buddhist Spirituality. Later China, Korea, Japan and the Modern World; edited by Takeuchi Yoshinori, Delhi: Motilal Banarsidass
- Kim, Jong-in (2004), Philosophical contexts for Wŏnhyo's interpretation of Buddhism, Jimoondang International
- Lai, Whalen (2003), Buddhism in China: A Historical Survey. In Antonio S. Cua (ed.): Encyclopedia of Chinese Philosophy (PDF), New York: Routledge, archived from the original (PDF) on November 12, 2014
- Liang-Chieh (1986), The Record of Tung-shan, Translated by William F. Powell, Kuroda Institute
- Muller, A. Charles (1995), "The Key Operative Concepts in Korean Buddhist Syncretic Philosophy: Interpenetration (通達) and Essence-Function (體用) in Wŏnhyo, Chinul and Kihwa", Bulletin of Toyo Gakuen University (3): 33–48, archived from the original on 2009-12-29
- Muller, A. Charles (1999), "Essence-Function and Interpenetration: Early Chinese Origins and Manifestations", Bulletin of Toyo Gakuen University, 7
- Muller, A. Charles (2005), Plumbing Essence and Function: The Culmination of the Great Buddhist-Confucian Debate, archived from the original on 2008-12-21
- Park, Sung-bae (1983), Buddhist Faith and Sudden Enlightenment, SUNY Press, ISBN 0-87395-673-7
- Park, Sung-bae (2009), One Korean's approach to Buddhism: the mom/momjit paradigm, SUNY Press, ISBN 978-0-7914-7697-0
- Siderits, Mark (2003), "On the Soteriological Significance of Emptiness", Contemporary Buddhism, 4 (1): 9–23, doi:10.1080/1463994032000140158, S2CID 144783831
- Spence, Jonathan D. (1999), The Search for Modern China, Norton, ISBN 0-393-30780-8
- Tarocco, Franceska (2008), "Lost in Translation? The Treatise on the Mahāyāna Awakening of Faith (Dasheng qixin lun) and its modern readings", Bulletin of the School of Oriental and African Studies, 71 (2): 324–325, doi:10.1017/S0041977X08000566, hdl:10278/3684313
