= Young America Township =

Young America Township may refer to:

- Young America Township, Edgar County, Illinois
- Young America Township, Carver County, Minnesota

== See also ==
- Young America (disambiguation)
