= Yunga =

Yunga may refer to:

- Yunga region of Peru, Bolivia, and northern Argentina
- Yunga District, a district of Peru
- two provinces of Bolivia: Nor Yungas Province and Sud Yungas Province
- Mochica language, also called Yunga
- Noongar language, also called Yunga
- Noongar (Yunga), an ethnic group

== See also ==
- Yungas Cocalera Revolution, a political group in Bolivia
- Yungas Road, a cycle route in Bolivia
