= Vajrasamadhi-sutra =

The Vajrasamadhi-sutra is the reconstructed Sanskrit title of a Buddhist sutra ascribed to Shakyamuni Buddha but produced in Korea under the name Kumgang sammae kyong (Chinese: 金剛三昧經; pinyin: Jīngāng sānmèi jīng; Japanese: Kongō sanmaikyō), or the Adamantine Absorption Sutra. Although it was originally believed to have been a Chinese translation from a Sanskrit text, scholars have recently found that it was produced in Korea in about 685 CE and that it may be connected with the emergence of Seon in Korea.

== History ==
According to Buswell, the Vajrasamadhi-sutra is thought to be an apocryphal scripture written by a Korean monk around 685 CE. Hagiograpic accounts claim a supernatural origin for the text: when a Silla king sent an envoy to China in order to find medicine for his sick queen, the party was taken to bottom of the sea by a dragon king who entrusted the text to them, saying the text should be arranged by the unknown monk Taean and commented on by Wonhyo. In reality the text was likely connected with the emergence of Seon in Korea, and if this is the case it would be only the second known Korean text in this tradition. Wonhyo wrote a commentary on the text shortly after its production called the Kumgang sammaegyong non in which he speculates that it may have been the inspiration for the Awakening of Faith in the Mahayana, which was in fact written over a hundred years earlier. The text includes quotations of Bodhidharma, who lived in the 6th century CE, and references to the East Mountain Teachings of Daoxin and Hongren, both of whom lived in the 7th century. The aim of the text appears to be the synthesis of newly introduced Chan Buddhism with already established Huayan Buddhism.

== Contents ==
The Adamantine Absorption Sutra presents itself as a fusion of all pre-existing Mahayana ideas with the Vinaya precepts that work together to give a complete system of Buddhist meditation. The aim of the text appears to be the synthesis of Chan Buddhism, which had just been introduced to Korea, with already established Huayan Buddhism. The text includes quotations of Bodhidharma and references to the East Mountain Teachings of Daoxin and Hongren. The author may have been attempting to fuse these disparate Chan traditions. The text also includes elements of the philosophy from the Awakening of Faith in the Mahayana, specifically the notion of one mind that has an aspect of true thusness on the one hand and arising/ceasing on the other.

== See also ==
- Korean Buddhism
- Zen
- Tathāgatagarbha Sutras
