= Jangah, Razavi Khorasan =

Jangah جنگاه
- Village
- Location within Iran
- Coordinates: 35°18′12″N 60°35′06″E
- Country: Iran
- Province: Razavi Khorasan
- County: Torbat-e Jam
- Bakhsh: Central
- Rural District: Mian Jam

Population (2006)
  - Total: 861
- Time zone: UTC+3:30 (IRST)
  - Summer (DST): UTC+4:30 (IRDT)

Jangah (Persian: جنگاه, also Romanized as Jangāh and Jang Gāh) is a village in Mian Jam Rural District, in the Central District of Torbat-e Jam County, Razavi Khorasan Province, Iran. At the 2006 census, its population was 861, in 170 families.
