= Jung-ah =

- Hangul: 정아
- RR: Jeonga
- MR: Chŏnga

Jung-ah, also spelled Jeong-ah, is a Korean given name.

- Sung Jung-a (born 1965), South Korean basketball player
- Koo Jeong-a (born 1967), South Korean visual artist
- Seok Jung-ah (born 1971), South Korean volleyball player
- Shin Jeong-ah (born 1972), South Korean art professor
- Yum Jung-ah (born 1972), South Korean actress
- Park Jung-ah (born 1981), South Korean singer, former member of girl group Jewelry
- Kim Jung-ah (born 1983), South Korean idol singer, member of After School
- Sunwoo Jung-a (born 1985), South Korean singer
- Park Jeong-ah (volleyball) (born 1993), South Korean volleyball player

== See also ==
- List of Korean given names
