= Young, West Virginia =

- Unincorporated community
- Location within West Virginia Location within the United States
- Coordinates: 38°38′20″N 81°40′36″W
- Country: United States
- State: West Virginia
- County: Jackson
- Elevation: 696 ft (212 m)
- Time zone: UTC-5 (Eastern (EST))
  - Summer (DST): UTC-4 (EDT)
- ZIP codes: 25248
- Area code: 304
- GNIS ID: 1556042

Young is an unincorporated community in Jackson County, West Virginia, United States.
