= Yong, Ghana =

Community in Northern Region of Ghana

Coordinates: 9°20′N 0°49′W

Yong is a farming community and suburb of Tamale in the Tamale Metropolitan District in the Northern Region of Ghana.

== See also ==
- Suburbs of Tamale (Ghana) metropolis
