= Young Island (disambiguation) =

Young Island may refer to:

- Young Island, Southern Ocean
- Young Island (Grenadines)
- Young Island (Nunavut)
