= Seonamsa =

Buddhist temple in Suncheon, South Korea

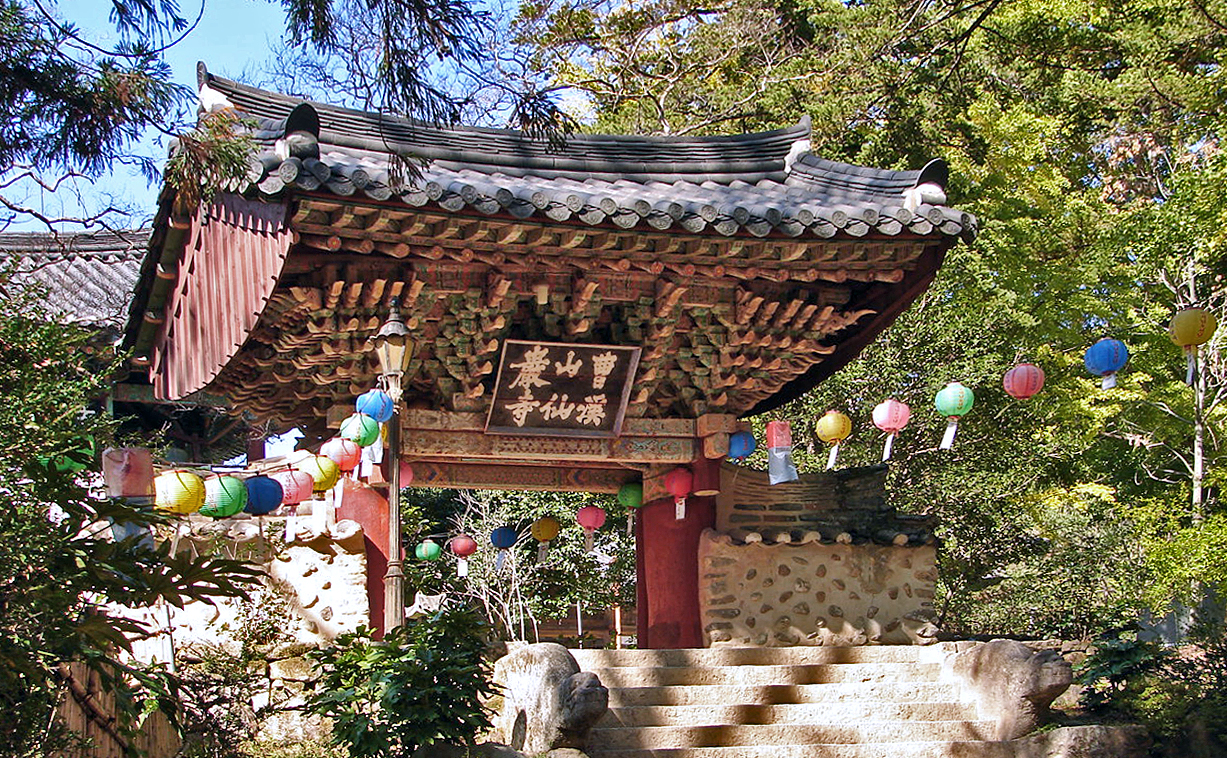

Location
- Location: Suncheon, South Korea
- Interactive map of Seonamsa
- Coordinates: 34°59′45.8″N 127°19′49.7″E

Architecture
- UNESCO World Heritage Site
- Criteria: Cultural: iii
- Designated: 2018
- Parent listing: Sansa, Buddhist Mountain Monasteries in Korea
- Reference no.: 1562-6
- Historic Sites of South Korea
- Official name: Seonamsa Temple, Suncheon
- Designated: 2009-12-21
- Reference no.: 507

Korean name
- Hangul: 선암사
- Hanja: 仙巖寺
- RR: Seonamsa
- MR: Sŏnamsa

Seonamsa (Korean: 선암사; Hanja: 仙巖寺) is a Korean Buddhist temple on the eastern slope at the west end of Jogyesan Provincial Park, within the northern Seungjumyeon District of the city of Suncheon, South Jeolla Province, South Korea. It belongs to the Taego Order although the Jogye Order claims possession over it.

The name Seonam ("Xian's Precipice", 仙 巖) is derived from the legend that a xian, an immortal, once played the game of Go here.

About 1 kilometre (0.62 mi) from the entrance towards the main temple grounds, two rainbow-shaped bridges appear; the second-larger one being Seungseon Bridge. Just beyond Seungseon Bridge is Gangseon Pavilion. Past the pavilion, the small oval-shape pond called Samindang comes into site. Inside the pond is a small islet with an evergreen, creating an attractive setting.

Going further on the Ilju Gate appears, beyond which the various temple buildings emerge. The large timbers of the main temple buildings blend with the surrounding Jogye mountains and with the nature surrounding them.

A hiking trail to the left of Seonam Temple leads to Maaeburi, a 17 metres (56 ft)-high sculpture engraved on a rock. Seonamsa is beautiful throughout the year, especially in the spring when all the flowers are in bloom, as well as in the fall with all the autumn colors.

With 19 National Cultural Properties in its halls and museum, there are few Korean Buddhist temples with more treasures than Seonamsa.

== History ==
Legend states that in 529, the missionary monk Ado (阿道) built a hermitage at this site on the eastern slope of Jogyesan and named it Biroam (Chinese: 毘盧庵; pinyin: Pílúān; Korean: 비로암).

350 years later in 861, Doseon constructed a grand temple here and named it Seonamsa. As the head temple of the samamsa trio ("three 'rock' temples") with Unamsa (雲岩) and Yongamsa (龍岩), Seonamsa played a fundamental role in the development of Seon Buddhism, and many masters have practiced, taught and attained awakening here.

During the Japanese invasions of Korea (1592–98), many of Seonamsa's buildings were destroyed, along with much of the country. Restoration came after the war, and a new plan to restore the temple to the original 11th century configuration has been underway since 1992.

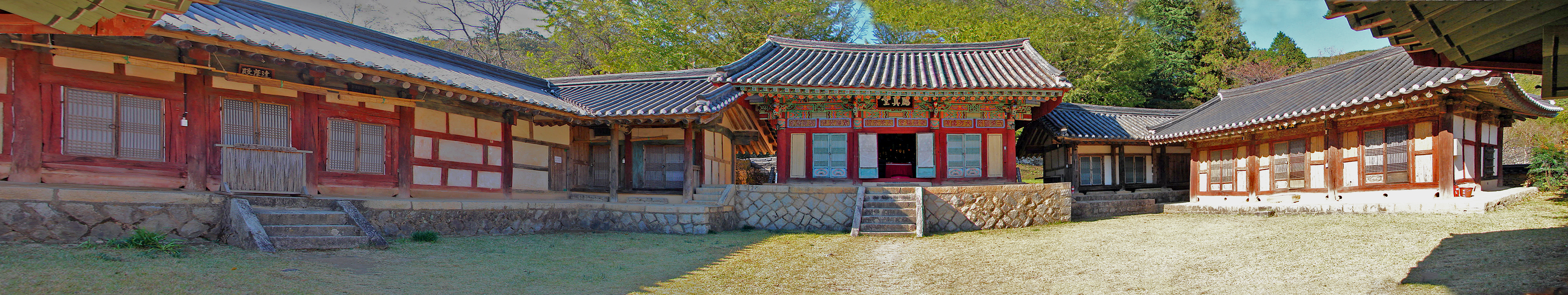
Seonamsa's Eungjindang (應真堂): a shrine, center, on the grounds of the temple complex

== Treasures ==
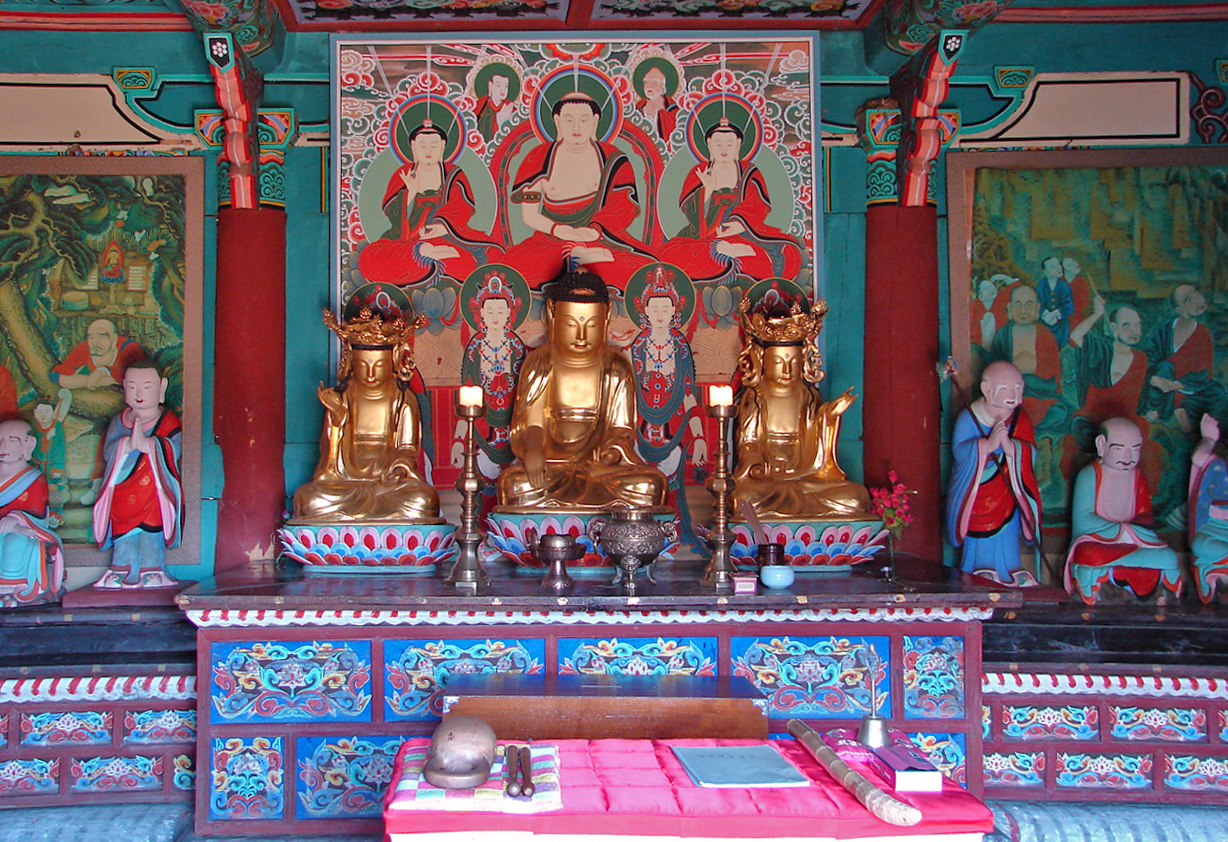
Main Hall

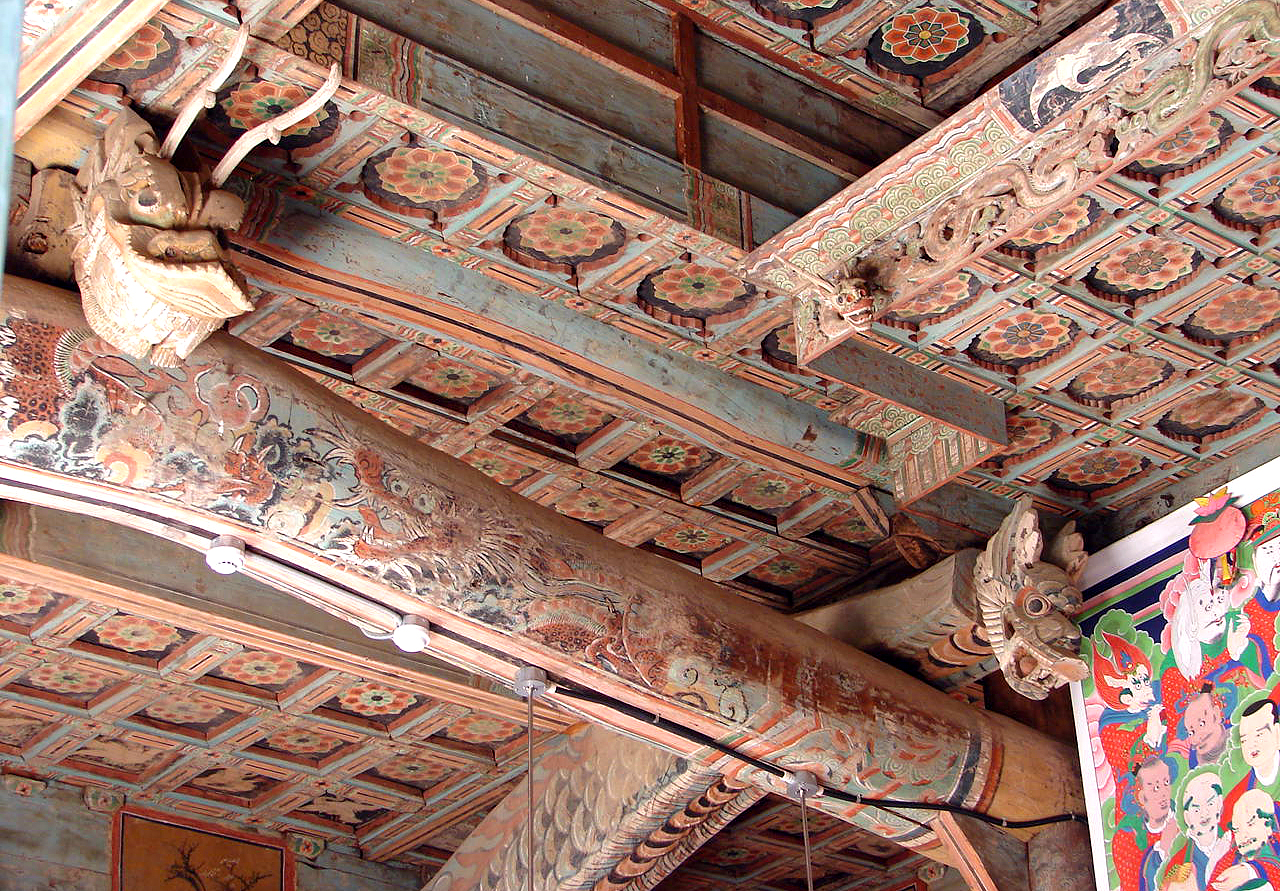
(Main Hall) ceiling

=== Seungseongyo ===
Seungseongyo (승선교 / 昇仙橋), Seungseon Bridge, is a granite stone bridge constructed in semi-circular arch configuration 14 meters/46 feet long and 3.5-meters (11.5 feet) wide. Seungseon means ‘the ascending immortals’.

Monk Hoan built this Joseon Era bridge over a period of six years beginning in 1713. Seungseongyo is considered to be amongst the most beautiful of the old stone bridges in Korea.

The protruding sculpture of a dragon's head below the midsection of the bridge, facing upstream, is intended to ward off evil spirits. The bridge's arch casts a magical reflection in the stream below with the image of the Gangseonru (pavilion) peeping out beneath, a short distance away. Because this charming bridge blends in so well with the valley below, it is often used as a location for shooting movies and TV shows.

Seungseongyo is Treasure #400.

=== Iljumun ===
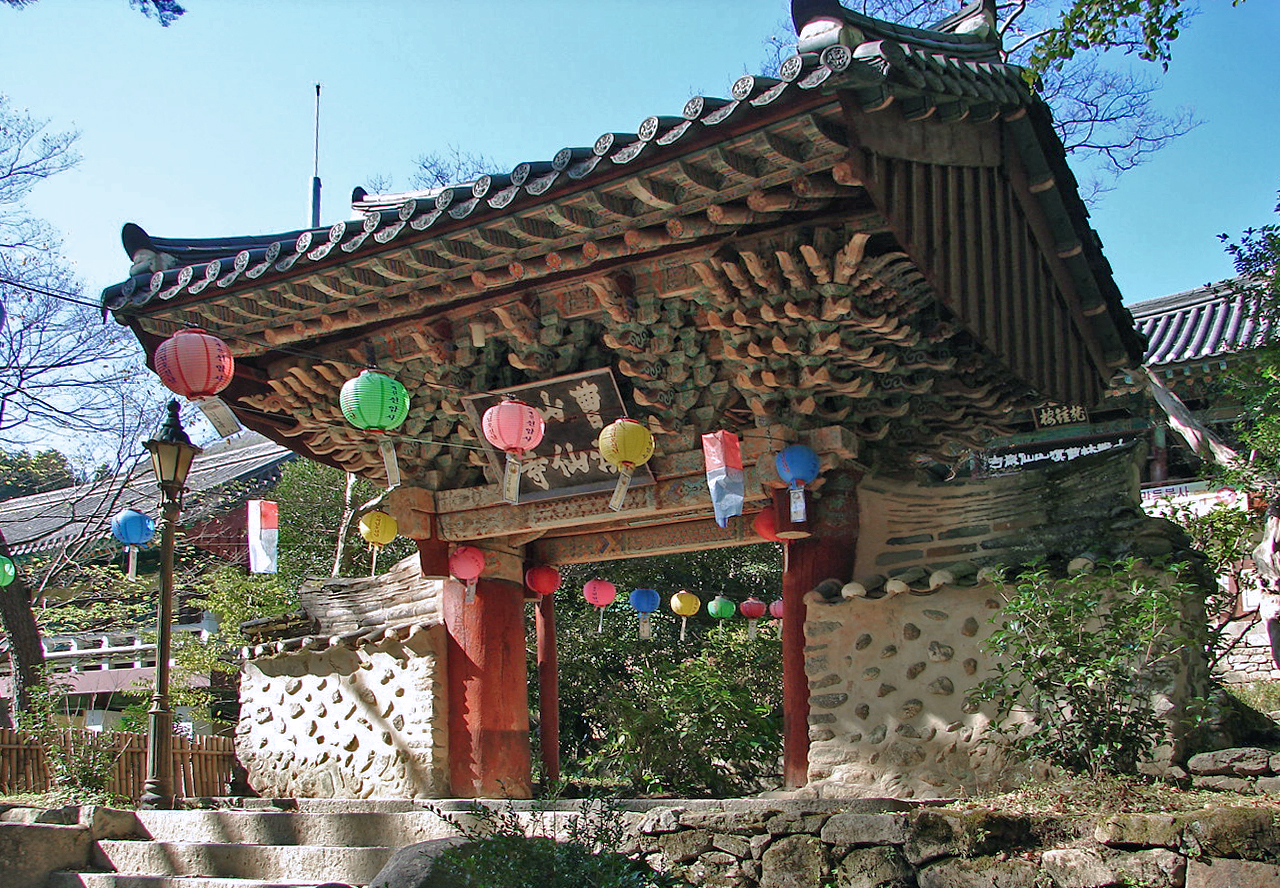
Seonamsa Iljumun

Iljumun is the first gate at the entrance to many Korean Buddhist temples. Called the "One-Pillar Gate", because when viewed from the side the gate appears to be supported by a single pillar. This symbolizes the one true path of enlightenment which supports the world. It is the boundary between the Buddhist temple and a human's worldly life. The gate symbolizes ritual purification and one must leave all of their worldly desires before entering the temple.

Seonamsa's Iljumun dates back to the Joseon dynasty. According to the records from the "Message for the framework-raising ceremony of Jogye Gate" the original Seonamsa Iljumun was destroyed by fire and restored in 1540. It was also recorded that the gate was again destroyed during the Qing invasion of Joseon battle and rebuilt in 1719.

Seonamsa's Iljumun blends with the neighboring forest.

Seonamsa Iljumun is Cultural Treasure #96.

=== Palsangjeon ===
Palsangjeon (Hall of Eight Pictures) is a worship hall found on a Korean Buddhist temple complex that contains the "Palsang", the series of painted murals depicting the eight stages in the life of the historic Buddha, Sakyamuni.

Seonamsa's Palsangjeon has five sections facing the front and three sections on the side. The hall is built in a style which has the brackets only on columns and a gabled roof. Records indicate the hall was built before the 18th century and has been restored twice, once in 1704 and again in 1707.

Seonamsa Palsangjeon is Tangible Cultural Property #60.

=== Wontongjeon ===
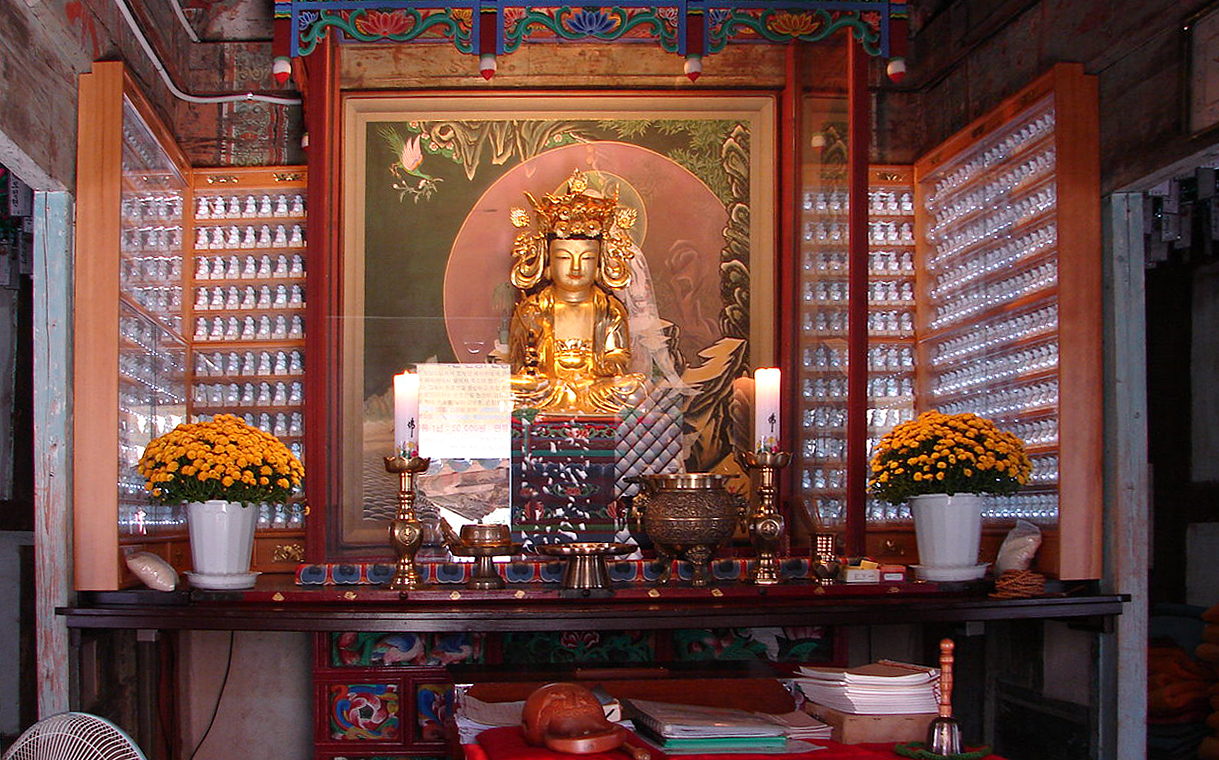
Inside Seonamsa Wontongjeon

Wontongjeon (Wontong Hall; 圎通殿) is where the Buddhist Goddess of Mercy is enshrined. The name "Wontong" signifies "juwon-yungtong" ("The truth is omnipresent and passes through everything").

Seonamsa's Wontongjeon was built in 1660. This structure is quite different from the Wontongjeon found at other Korean Buddhist temples because it has three sections. The one section in the front, and the two sections on the sides, form the shape of a "T". Two renovations occurred, one in 1698 and again in 1824.

Inside Wontongjeon there is a tablet that reads "Daebokjeon" (Hall of Great Luck), written personally by King Jeongjo (1752-1800). The King had asked the High Priest Nuram of Seonamsa to offer a prayer for a male heir, for 100 days. The prayer was answered with the birth of the King's son, Sunjo (1790-1834). As a token of his gratitude, the King awarded the temple this tablet in his own handwriting.

Seonamsa Wontongjeon Tangible Cultural Property #169.

=== Three-Storied Stone Pagodas ===
The Mahavira Hall (Main Hall) is the centerpiece of the temple, enshrining Gautama Buddha. On the east and west sides of the courtyard in front of the Mahavira Hall stand a pair of three-storied stone pagodas of nearly the same size and design. These stone pagodas were erected in the same year.

Seonamsa's pagodas are typical of the stone pagodas of the Silla era, from the 9th century, that enshrine śarīra (pearl or crystal-like bead-shaped objects that are purportedly found among the cremated ashes of spiritual masters). The main body of the pagodas and roof stones are cut from a single piece of stone. The double stylobate has three pillars carved in relief. Each side of the main body is carved with two simple pillars in relief. The roof stones are flat and broad on four layered supports with lifted corners.

The pair of Three-Storied Stone Pagodas at Seonamsa have been designated as National Treasure #395.

=== Lavatory ===
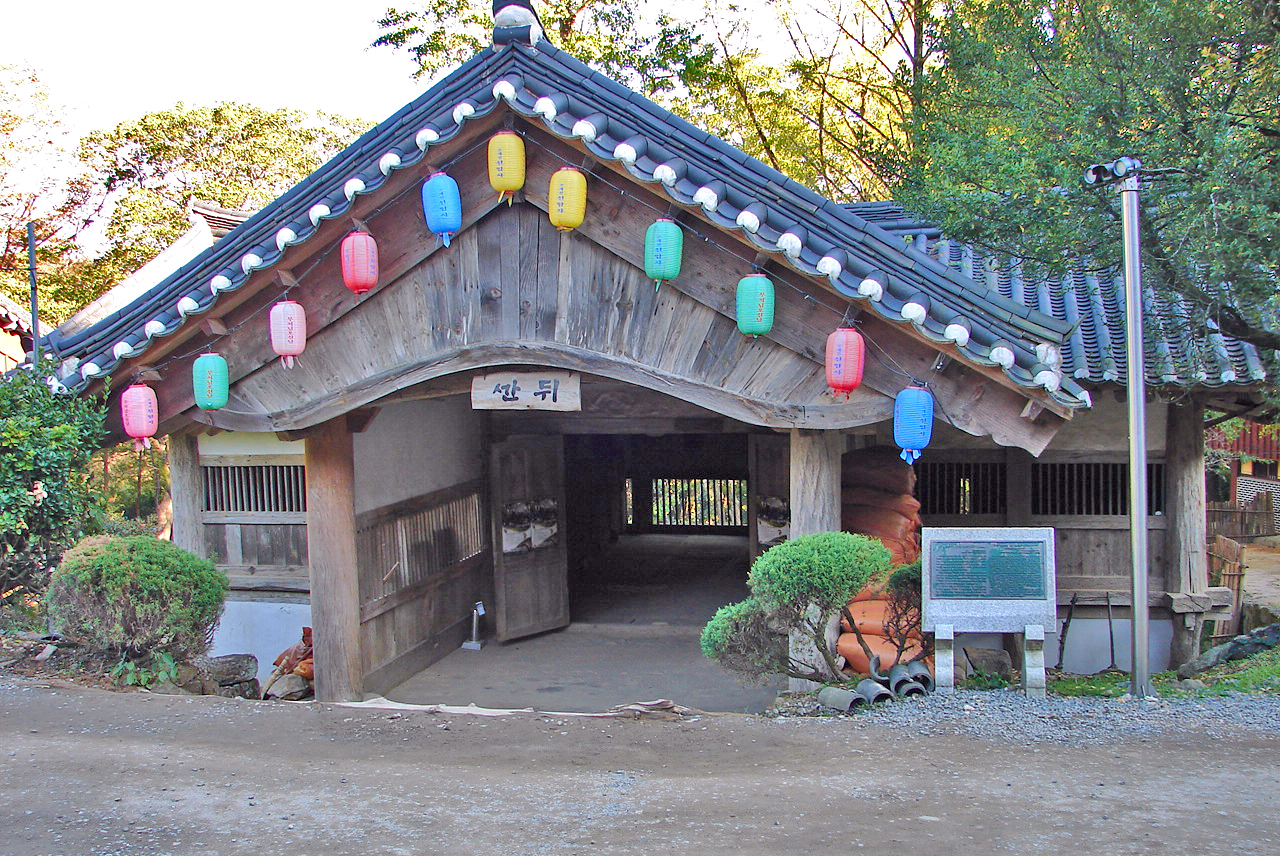
Seonamsa Lavatory

The Lavatory at Seonamsa is a rectangular wood building with an open entrance on the north side, built on elevated ground. One side is for male use and the other side is for female use. This wooden structure has ventilation lattices set high in the walls. Although it is a typical outdoor toilet, it is well kept and devoid of the usual odor. At the entrance of the lavatory, there is a stone basin for hand washing.

There is no documentation indicating the origin of Seonamsa's Lavatory, but it is thought to have existed since before the Japanese invasions of Korea (1592–98).

The Lavatory at Seonamsa has been designated as a Cultural Property Material #214, the first time a toilet has been recognized as a cultural asset.

=== Gakhwangjeon ===
Gakhwangjeon (hall; 각황전 / 覺皇殿), also known as Jangyukjeon, has a plaque in front identifying the "gakhwang" as Sakyamuni, who is "twice as tall as people who have (an) average height".

It's not known when the hall was first built but it was renovated in 861 by Monk Daegak. Gakhwangjeon was destroyed during the Imjinwaeran war and was rebuilt in 1660. Renovations occurred in 1760 and again in 1801.

Gakhwangjeon is a small hall with an area in the front and another on the side. The foundation is made of stone and large corner stones support the building's columns. The roof is hip-and-gable having double eaves with three brackets set between the columns.

Seonamsa Gakhwangjeon is Cultural Property Material #177.

=== Monument to the Restoration of Seonamsa ===
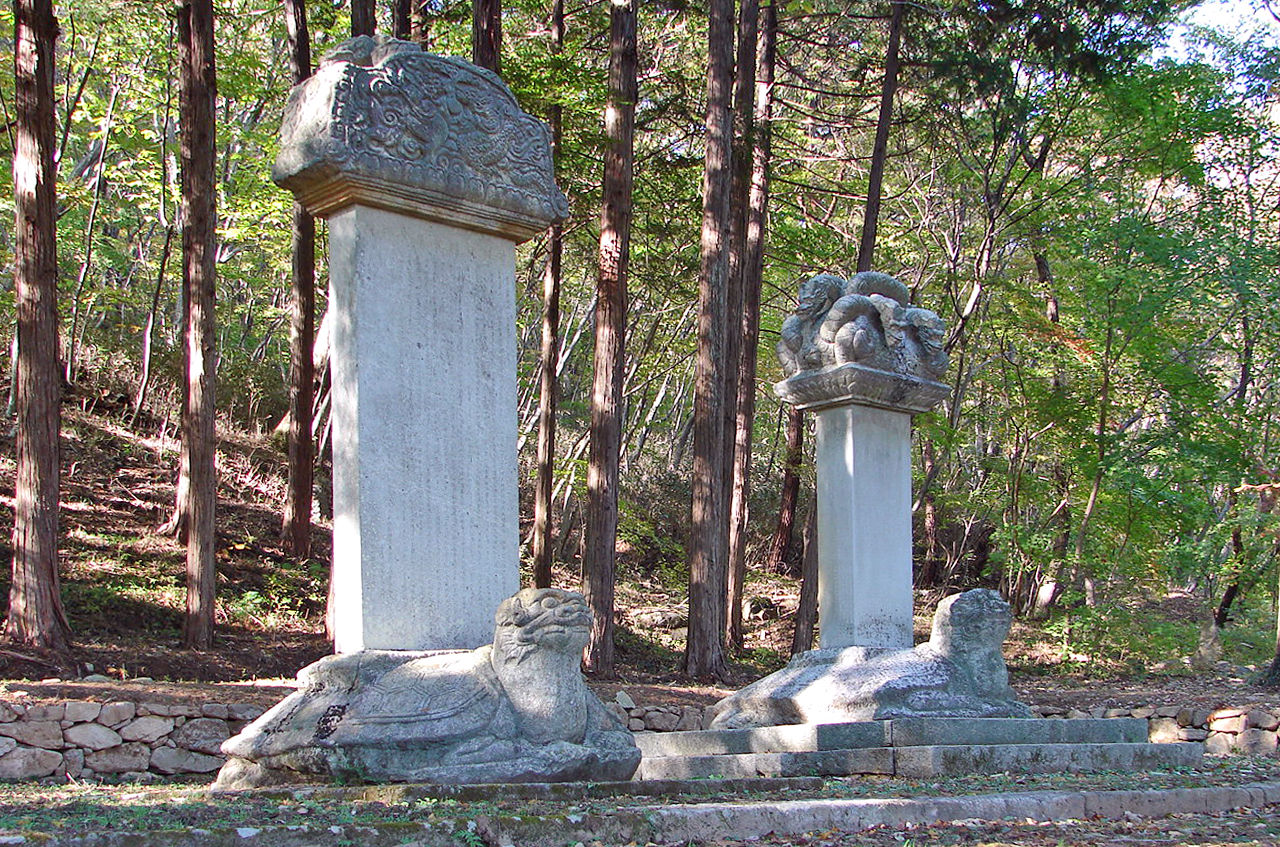
Seonamsa Monument to the Restoration of Seonamsa

Most of Seonamsa was destroyed during the Japanese invasions of Korea (1592–98). This monument was erected in 1707 to commemorate the restoration of Seonamsa that was led by the monk Yakhyu.

The monument has a turtle shaped base with the body and head of the base having the embellishments of a dragon. This monument is typical of those of the Joseon Era and is considered to be one of the best examples of that style. The monument measures 5 metres (16 ft), 1.25 metres (4 ft 1 in) wide and 0.3 metres (1 ft 0 in) deep.

The inscription on monument the reads; "Seonam Temple, destroyed by fire during the second Japanese Invasion, was renovated by Monk Yakhyu and others".

The Monument to the Restoration of Seonamsa is Tangible Cultural Property #92.

=== Seonam maes ===
The Seonam maes (매 / 梅 ‘mume trees at Seonamsa’), which could number about 50 trees, live along the tile-roofed fenced road leading to Unsouam (hermitage), Wontongjeon (hall) and Gakwhangjeon (hall).

In the absence of any records, the exact ages of the trees is unknown. However, according to oral traditions of the temple, the trees were planted, together with the Wasong (the Reclined Pine tree) in front of the Cheonbuljeon (hall), around 600 years ago.

These Seonam White Mume trees, in the back of Wontongjeon (hall) and long the tile-rooted fence road leading to Kakwhangjeon (hall), are known to be the most valuable of the Mume trees.

Seonam White Mume trees were designated as Korean National Natural Monuments #488.

=== Samindang ===
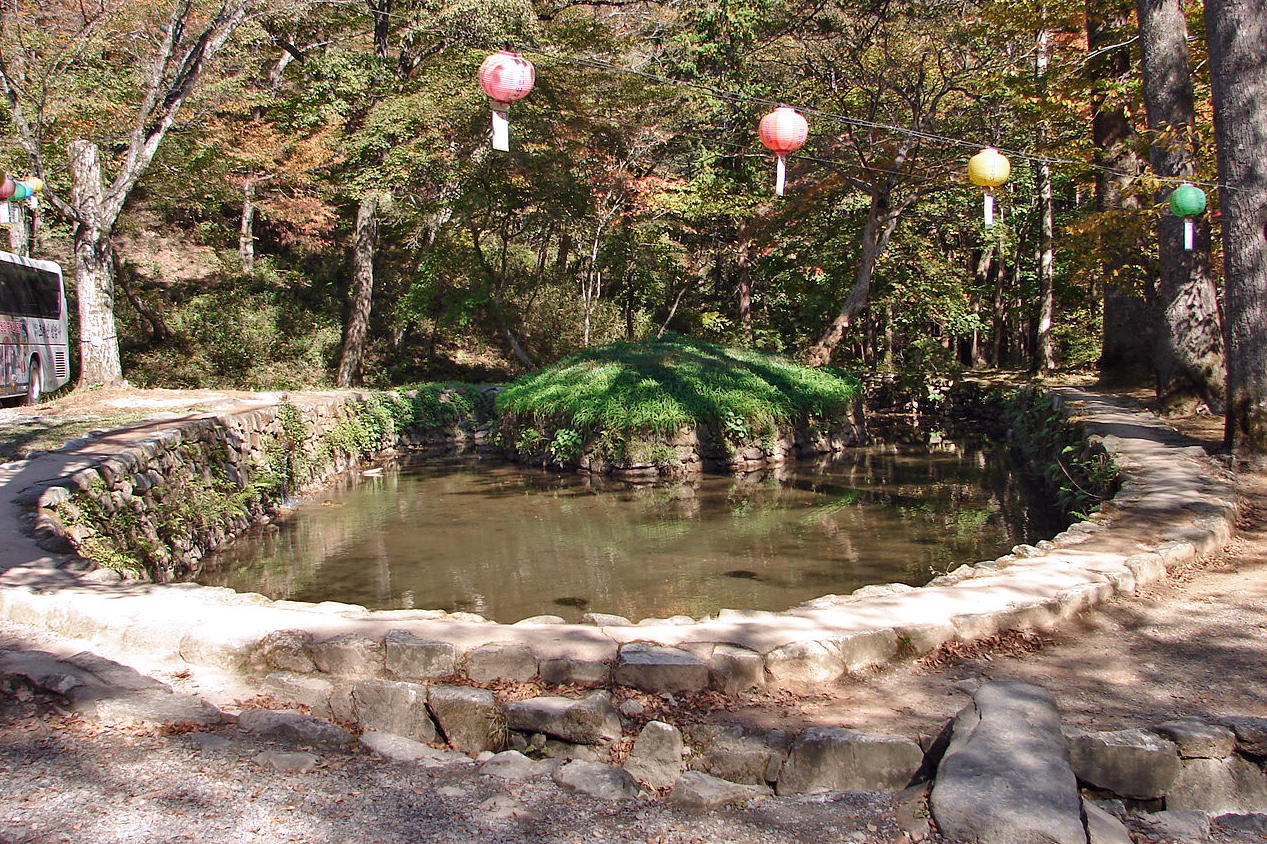
Seonamsa Samindang, a little pond

Just past the Gangseon Pavilion and before reaching Ilju Gate is a small oval pond called Samindang (삼인당 / 三印塘), "the pond of the three marks". In the middle of the pond, there is a small islet covered with vegetation. According to Seonamsa's historical records, Samindang was created by the monk Doseon in 862.

A plaque at the pond reads, "the three marks represent Buddhist ideals: 'Everything changes and there is no being. When people realize it, they enter nirvana'".

Seonamsa Samindang, a unique temple structure, is Monument #46.

== Special Features ==
=== Wild Tea Field ===
Seonamsa has a wild tea field which covers an area of over 18 square kilometers/7 square miles. There are tea plants as much as 300 to 400 years old in the wild tea field. Fertilizers or chemicals have never been used. The tea field has been maintained in its natural state throughout the years.

The monks hand pick the modest harvest beginning in April. Due to the tea leaves rich sweet fragrance, the tea commands a high price. Legend says that long ago mothers who sent their daughters off to be married gave them a packet of these tea seeds as a perfume.

=== Stone Basins ===
Seonamsa's stone basins supply water to the temple using four basins, a square one and three circular ones. The stone basins are connected sequentially by tubes of bamboo.

The four basins have a different function based on the order of water flow. The first basin is for water to be offered up to the Buddha, the second one supplies water to clean food for the Buddha, the third is for the use by humans, and the fourth basin is for all other purposes.

The stone basins have become famous because they appear in the 2003 film Dongseung (A Little Monk).

== Gallery ==
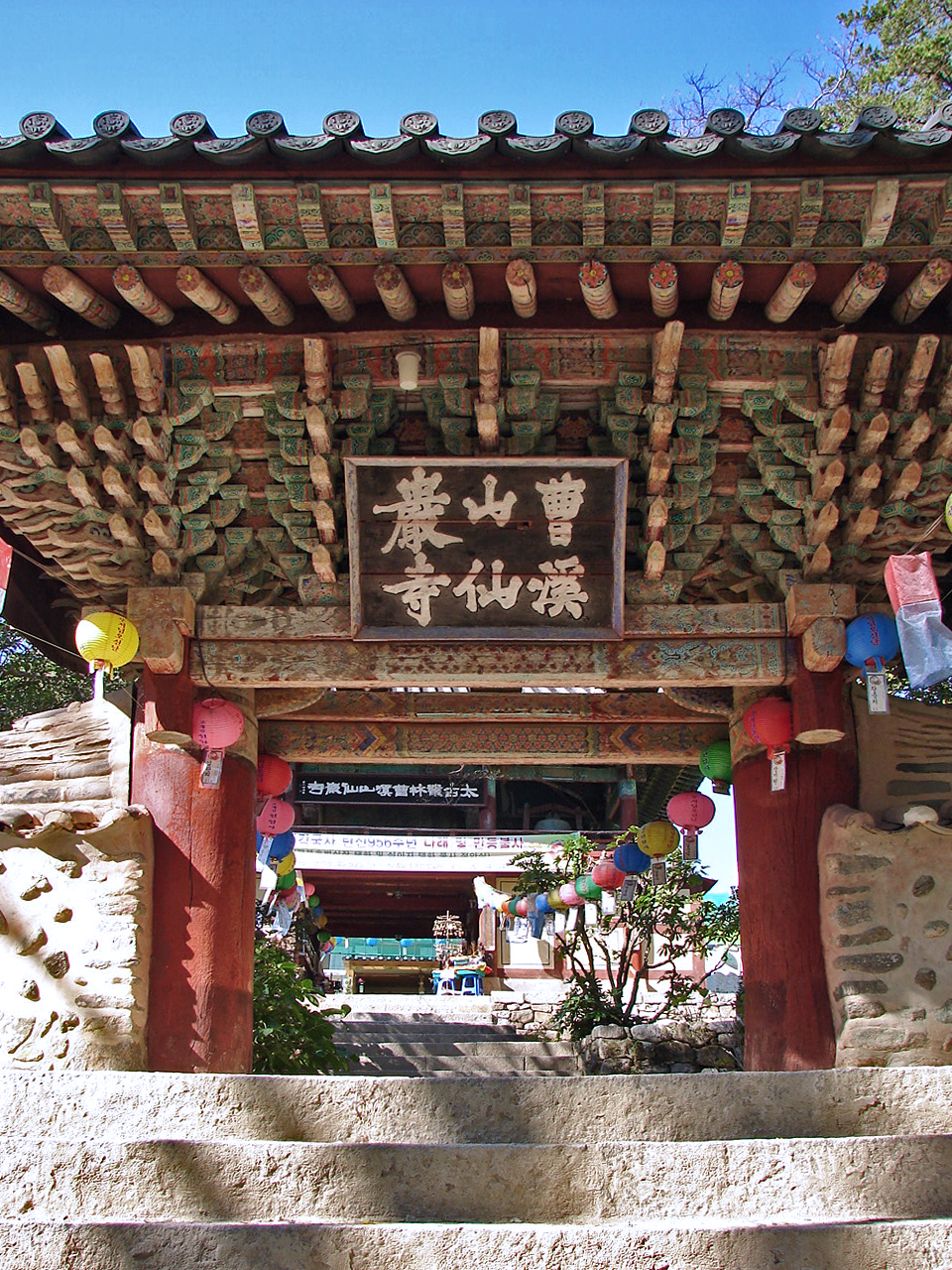

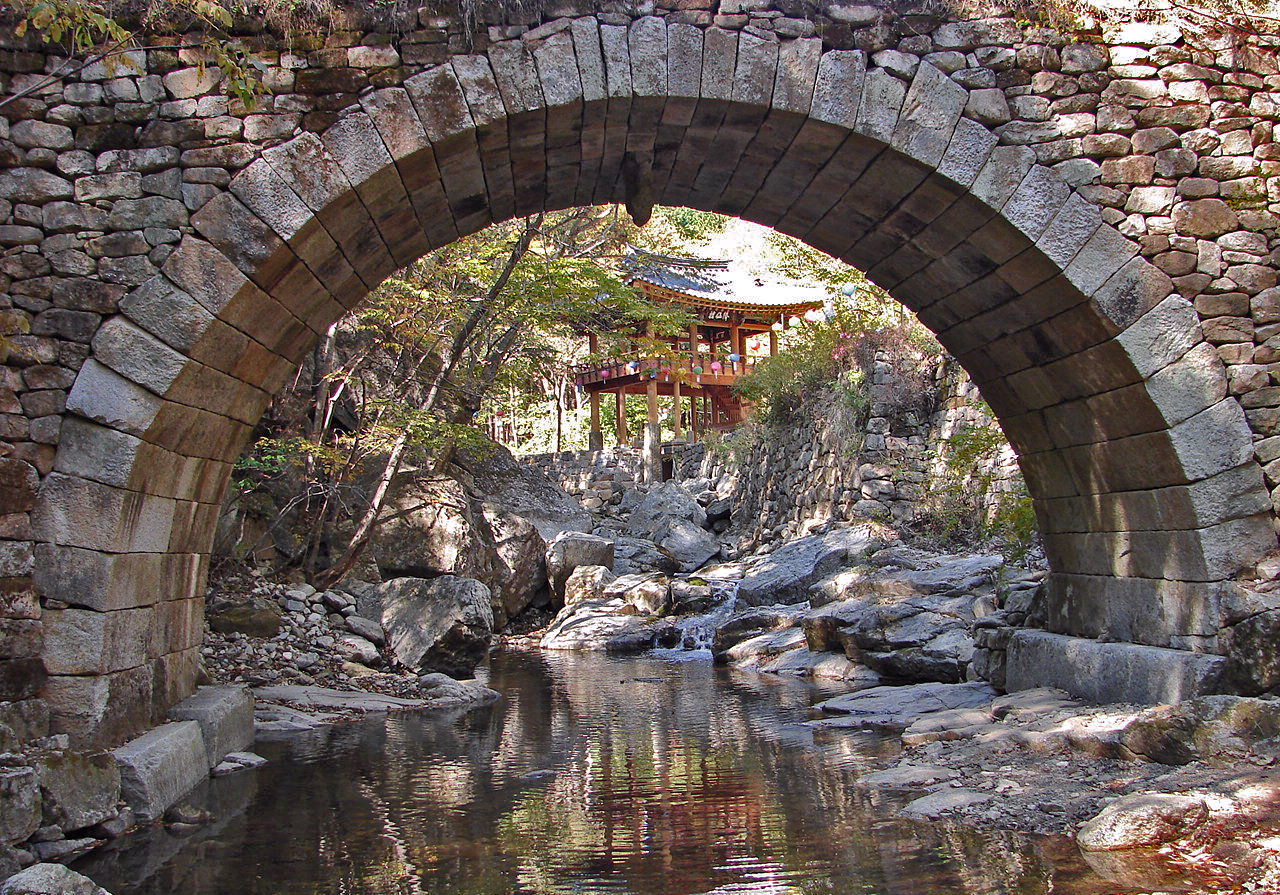

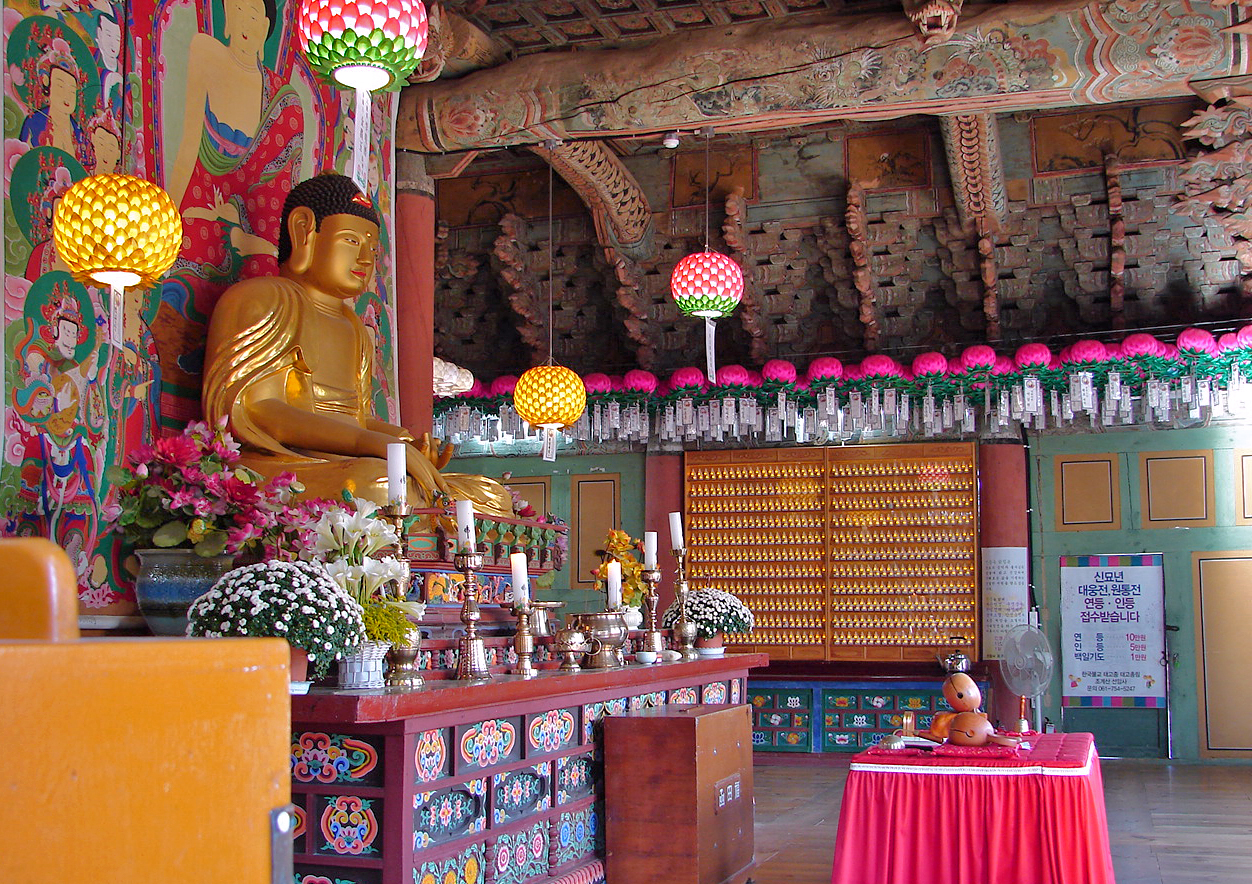
Main Hall

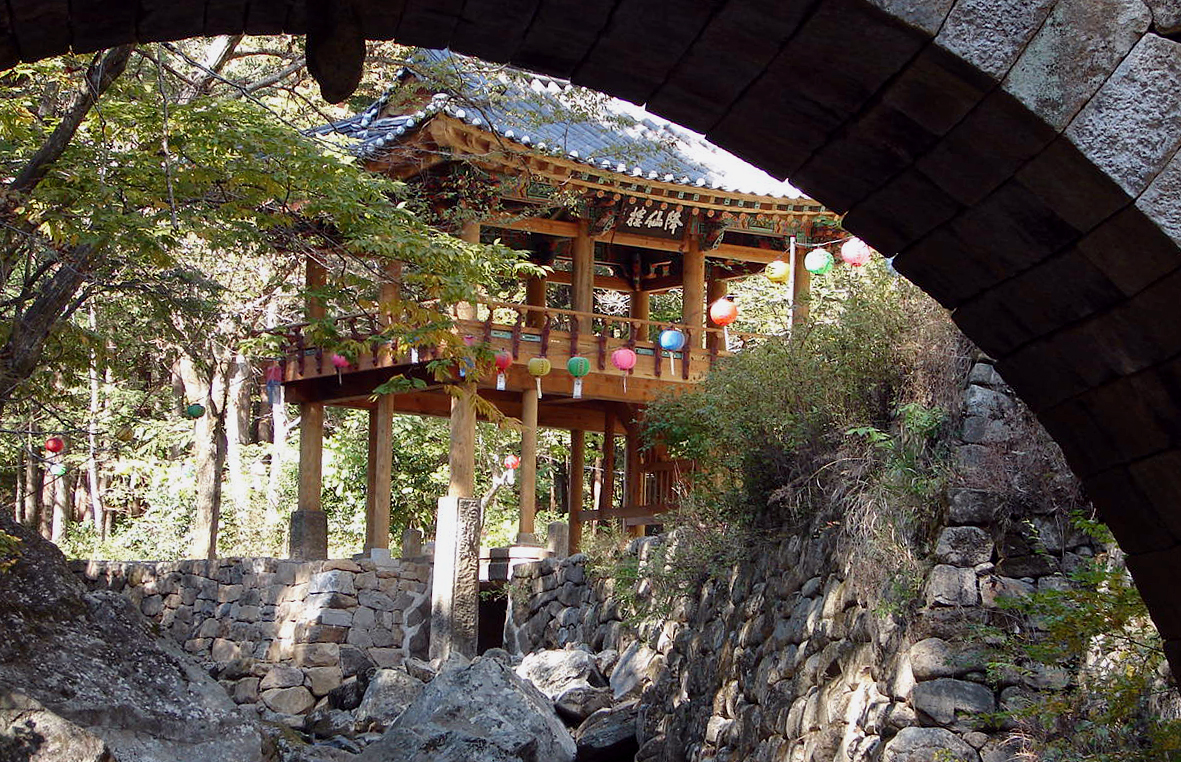
Seonamsa Seungseongyo (bridge) with Gangseonru (pavilion) below

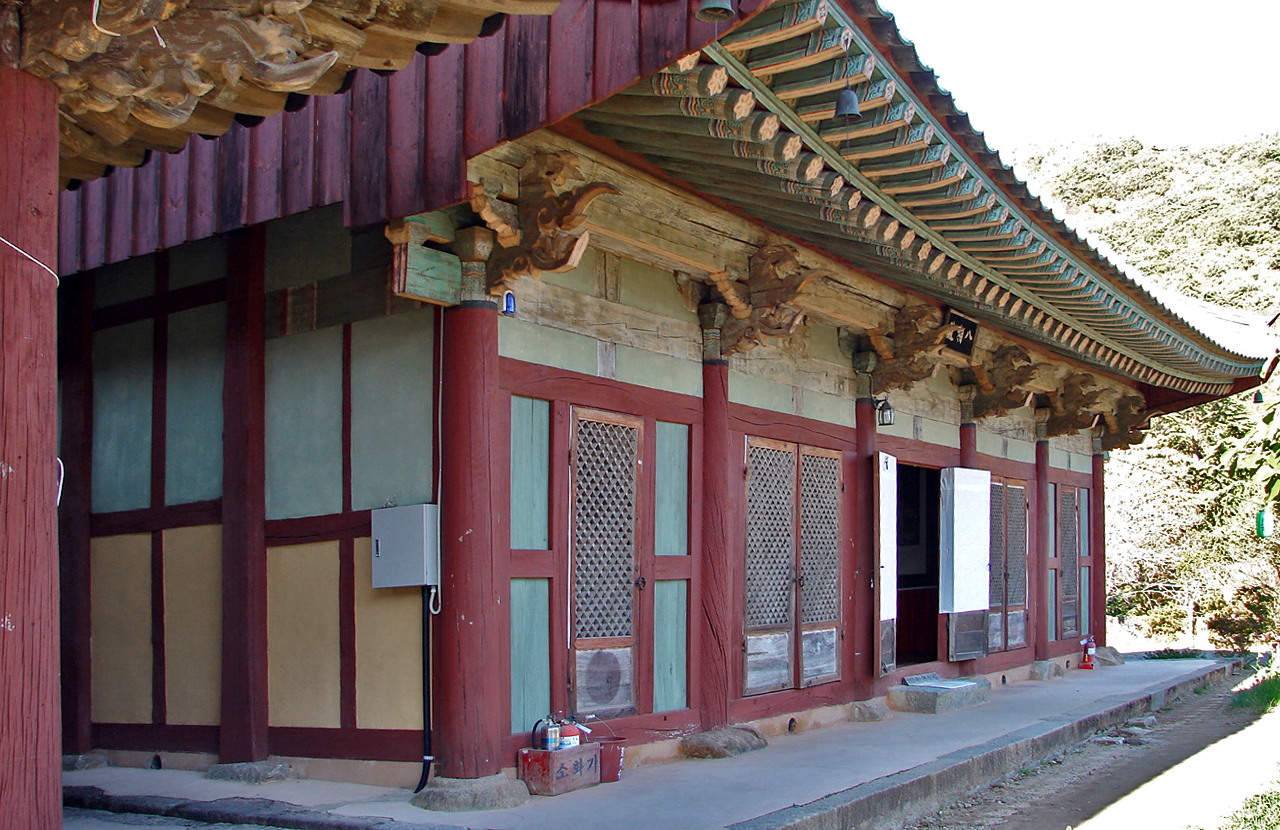
Seonamsa Palsangjeon - Hall of Eight Pictures

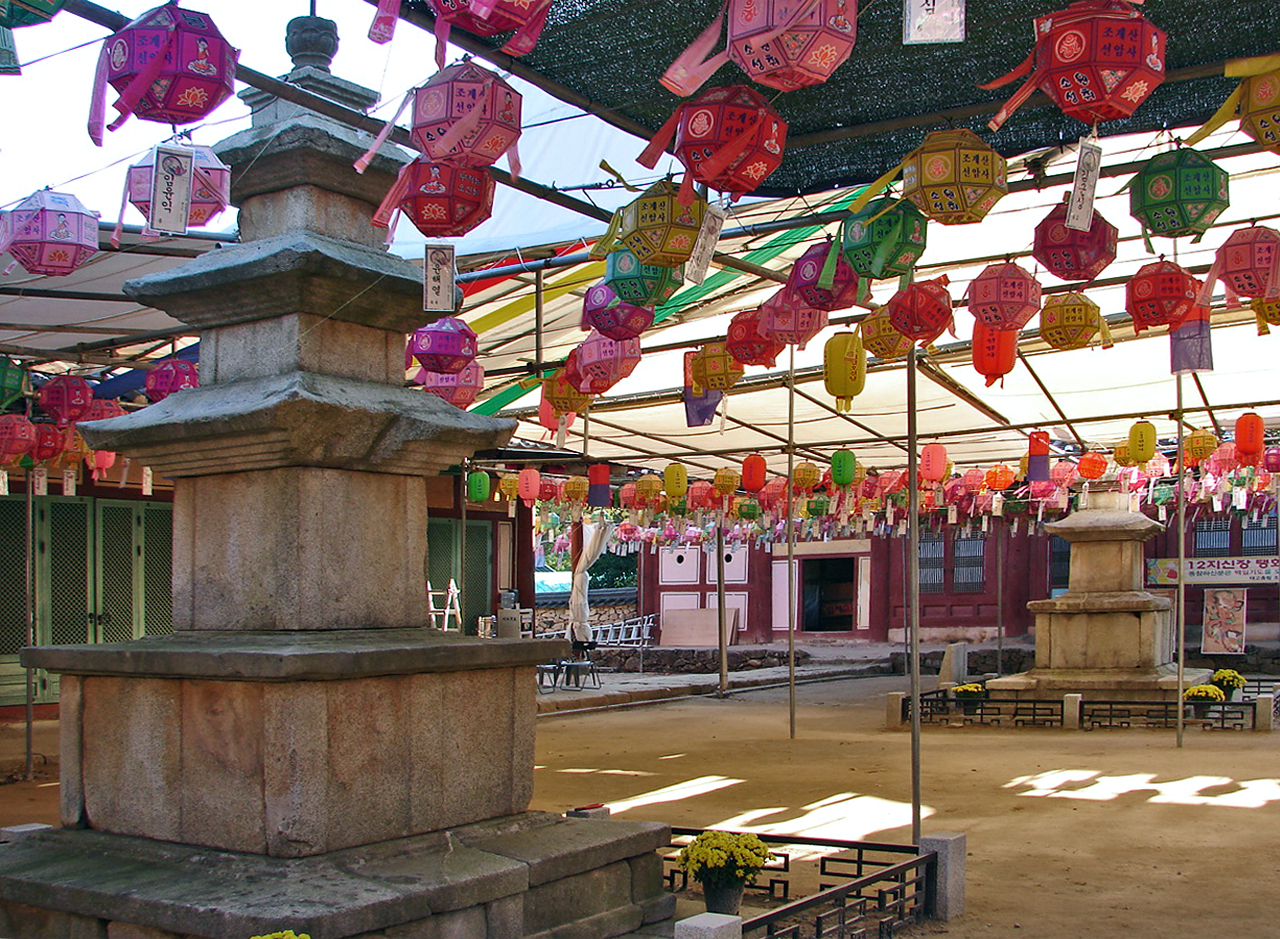
The pair Seonamsa's 3 Story Stone Pagodas

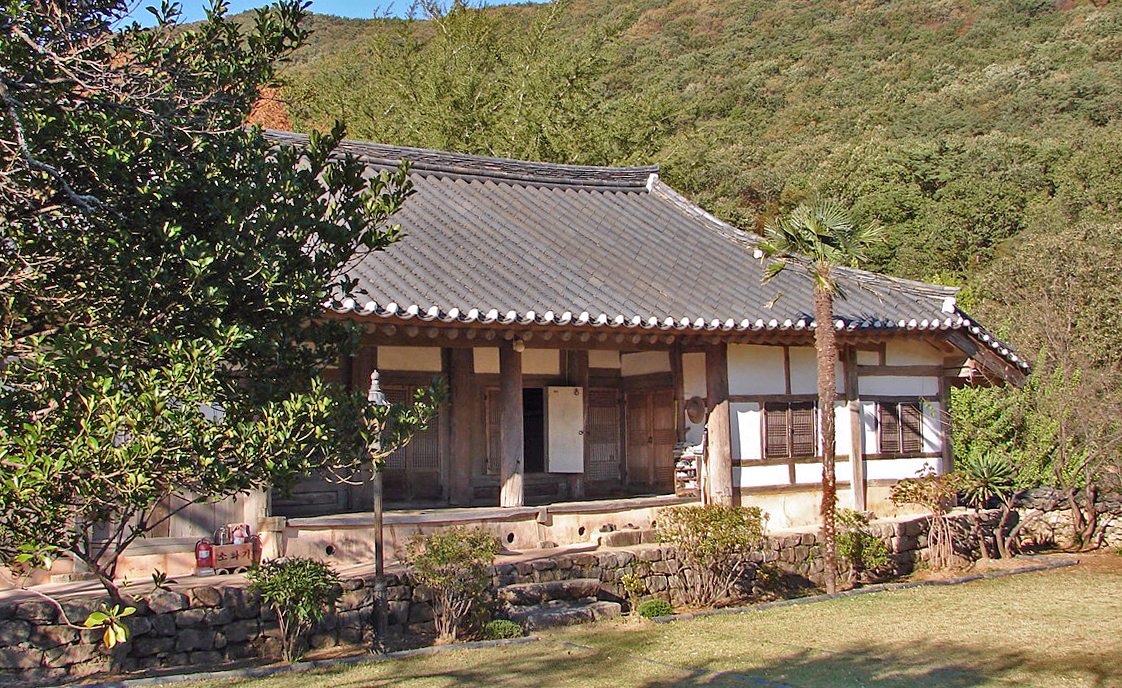
Seonamsa Gakhwangjeon (Hall)

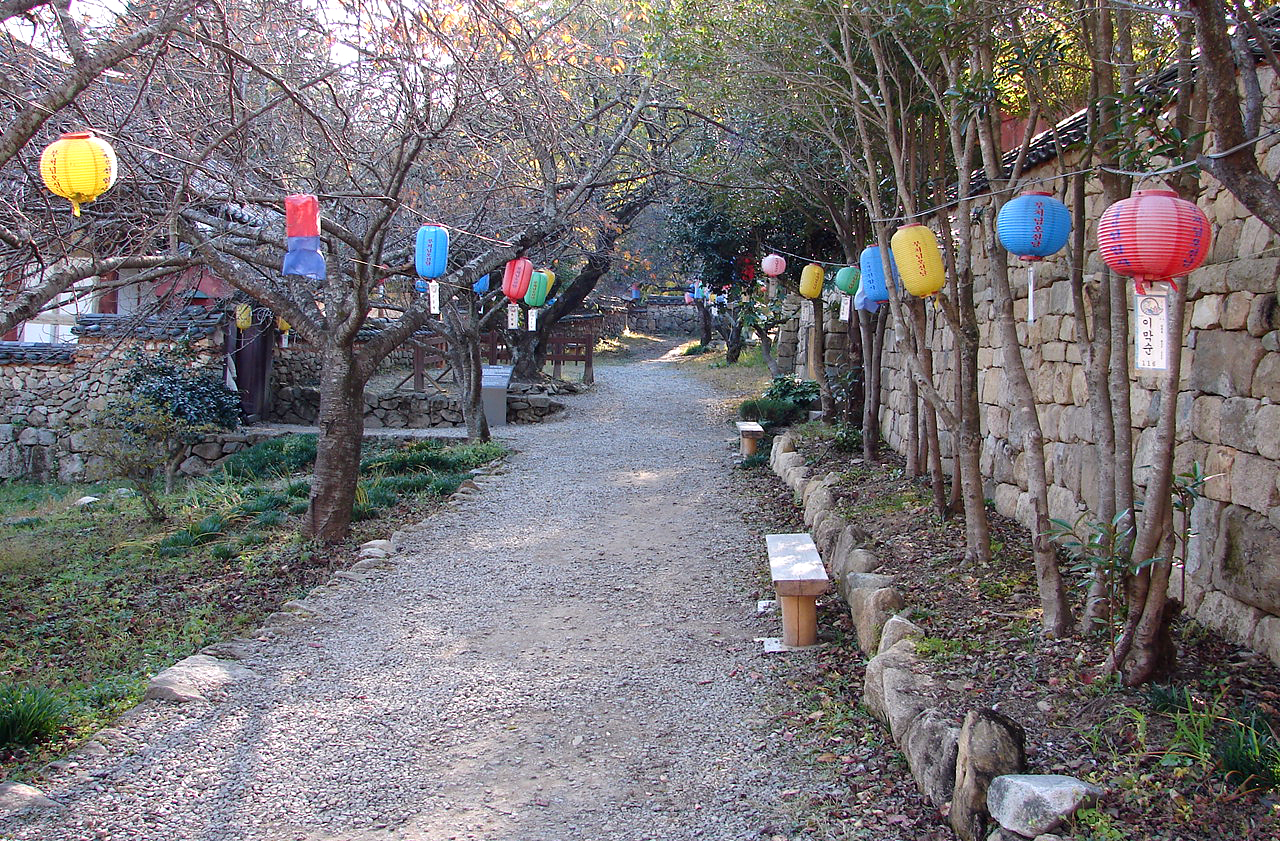
Seonamsa Mume Trees along tiled-roofed fence

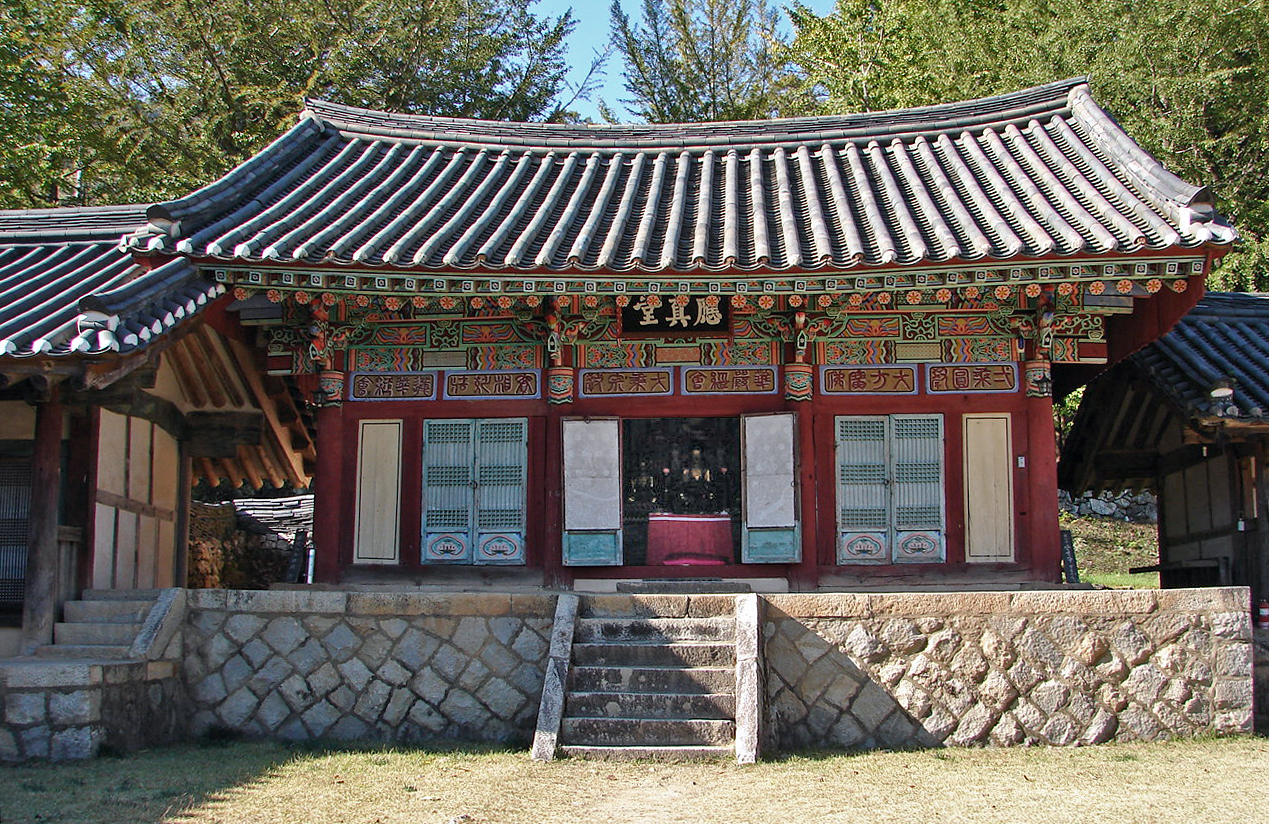
Seonamsa Eungjindang (Shrine)

External videos
- Seonamsa Video Slideshow
- Seonam Temple, Suncheon
