= Hyunoong =

Korean Zen master (born 1946)

Hyunoong Sunim
- Title: Sunim

Personal life
- Born: October 2, 1946 (age 79) South Korea

Religious life
- Religion: Buddhism
- School: Seon also Taoist
- Lineage: Korean Ganhwa Seon

Senior posting
- Based in: Sixth Patriarch Zen Center; Sixth Patriarch Temple
- Predecessor: Kusan Sunim

Hyunoong Sunim is a Korean Zen master as well as a Taoist Master born in South Korea. He is a disciple of Ku San Sunim and entered Songgwangsa Buddhist Monastery in 1966. From 1966 to 1969 he studied in the Sutra Hall of Songgwangsa, studying Buddhist sutras and philosophy. In 1970 he began his studies of Zen philosophy and Zen meditation. After ten years of training in Zen Meditation halls, he felt that the traditional zen hall training was not helping his practice. He then lived for three years as a wandering beggar, begging for his food and places to sleep. This gave him the opportunity to let go of everything he was holding on to. It was during this period that he finally realized what correct zen practice really is, and felt that he was ready to study under a great master. He then went to Master Jeon Gang Sunim in YongHwaSa Temple in Incheon, South Korea and began studying under him.

At this point he began living in small remote mountain hermitages doing intensive zen practice. During this time he heard about a Taoist hermit who was teaching a Qigong breathing practice called "Kuk Sun-do". He began training under Taoist Master Chung San in 1972 and in 1982 was sanctioned as a Taoist Master. Master Sunim spent six years in rigorous practice alone in hermitages in remote mountain areas where he followed a raw food diet, eating what the mountains made available.

However, from the time he lived and practice in Zen meditation halls Master Sunim experienced health difficulties which no medical doctor or Chinese herbalist was able to alleviate. His lay supporters would bring him expensive ginseng to help give him more energy and strength, but this just worsened his condition and over time he became continually weaker. Finally he met an acupuncturist/herbalist who told him that he had a "Lesser Yang constitution" and gave him an herbal formula to take. Master Sunim described the results of this formula as suddenly turning his health around 180 degrees. He was astounded at how much better he felt and began to inquire about the system of medicine the herbalist was using. He was told this was traditional Korean Sasang Constitutional Medicine. Master Sunim immediately decided he was going to study this medical system. He felt that it was important that he learn to take care of his own health, since so many doctors had been unable to help him. During his years of practicing in hermitages he also studied Sasang Constitutional Medicine (SCM) under two renowned acupuncturist/herbalists. One of them was so impressed with Sunim's diligence and special skills in quickly understanding the principles of SCM that when he retired from his practice he gave all his journals and notes to Sunim for his own reference.

In 1985 he was invited by Hae Heng, a French monk who had studied in Songgwangsa, to become the spiritual director of the Buddhayana Vihara Zen Center in Geneva Switzerland. Master Sunim held this position from 1985 to 1986 His experience in Switzerland made him realize that, given his limited English and French skills, he needed a way to better understand his students and the personal problems about which they would seek his advice. Upon returning to South Korea in early 1986 he began to study the system of Five Element natal charts under a famous practitioner in the city of Gwangju, Cholla Namdo. These natal charts gave him some insight into the personality of the individual, and deepened his understanding of Five Element principles which he had studied in SCM.

In the early summer of 1986 Master Sunim, accompanied by Jaguang Sunim, a Canadian Buddhist nun who also trained in Songgwangsa, as his translator, traveled to Vancouver, BC Canada where he established a Zen and Sun-do center. Here he continued his own Zen practice, as well as continuing his studies of SCM herbology and Five Element natal charts. One day, while contemplating a natal chart, it suddenly occurred to him that the Five Elements visible in an individual's natal chart could provide a map indicating their body constitution in the SCM system. The most difficult part, the weakest link, of the Korean SCM system was the actual determination of a person's body constitution. Traditionally they had used various markers such as the physical shape of the body, pulse, blood type, personality, emotions etc. to try to determine the body constitution, but these had always proved to be somewhat inaccurate. Sunim decided to test his theory that the Five Element natal charts could point to the individual's body constitution with much more accuracy. In SCM herbology there is a broad set of many different formulas for each constitution. As long as the practitioner has correctly determined the constitution of the patient, then the herbal formulas for that constitution will all fundamentally agree with them and cause no irreversible harm. The healing energies of the herbs all fall into one of the Five Elements, so if the herbal formula was a combination of Five Elements that was compatible with the Five Element makeup of the patient's internal organs/energies, then in theory they would experience a beneficial response to the herbal formula. Through this system of testing, matching the Five Element natal chart with the Five Element energies of the herbal formulas, Master Sunim discovered that the natal charts did indeed provide an extremely accurate picture of the internal energy condition of the patient, and therefore showing the patient's body constitution. He continued to investigate and use these two systems over the next 20 years.

One early spring day, while sitting in the Zen hall, suddenly all his doubts were resolved and he wrote the following song of enlightenment:

               " Even existing dharmas must be discarded,
                 So how can we cling to Dharmas which don't exist!
                 Ah ha! Futilely the Ancients busily pursued
                 enlightenment, then departed.
                 The countenance, existing of its own accord
                 I wonder who named it buddha or sentient being?
                 Even one true Dharma cannot survive.
                 Outside the window, the cherry tree
                 is singing this news. "[citation needed]

He is currently head abbot of temples on two continents, the Sixth Patriarch Zen Center in Berkeley, CA and the Sixth Patriarch Temple in Seoul, South Korea. He has taught in various Zen centers throughout the United States and Switzerland.
