= Songgwangsa =

Buddhist temple at Jogyesan, South Korea

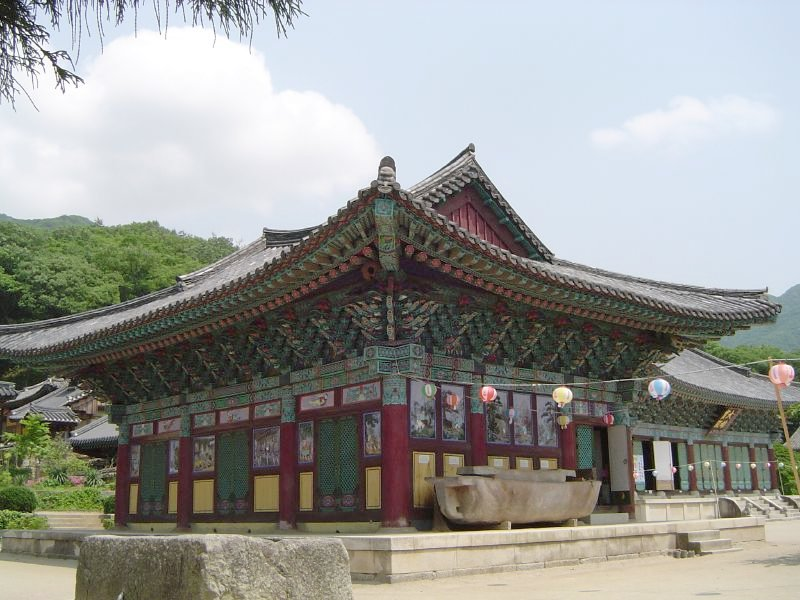
- Songgwangsa

- Location within South Korea

Religion
- Affiliation: Buddhism
- Sect: Jogye Order

Location
- Country: South Korea
- Coordinates: 35°00′08″N 127°16′34″E

Architecture
- Completed: 867
- Historic Sites of South Korea
- Official name: Songgwangsa Temple, Suncheon
- Designated: 2009-12-21
- Reference no.: 506

Korean name
- Hangul: 송광사
- Hanja: 松廣寺
- RR: Songgwangsa
- MR: Songgwangsa

Songgwangsa (Korean: 송광사; Hanja: 松廣寺; translation: Spreading Pine Temple; alternates: Songgwang-sa, or Songgwang Sa, or Songkwangsa; also known as: Piney Expanse Monastery; originally: Gilsangsa), one of the three jewels of Seon Buddhism, is located in South Jeolla Province on Mount Jogye on the Korean Peninsula. Situated approximately 18 miles (29 km) away from the sea, it is within the Jogyesan Provincial Park.

Founded in 867, it fell into disuse and was reestablished in 1190 by Seon master Jinul. Jinul's meditation teachings evolved from this monastery and contributed significantly to the Seon practice that prevails to this day in Korea. Songgwangsa is considered the "jewel" (Samgharatna) of the Korean monastic community. Though smaller in size, it is considered as the greatest among the trio of Three Jewels Temples representing “the Buddha, the dharma, and the sangha". The other two of the trio, Tongdosa and Haeinsa, are located in South Gyeongsang Province.

This monastery, though under the jurisdiction of the Jogye Order in Seoul, functions as an autonomous body. It controls a network of 49 small branch temples whose abbots are chosen from among the monks of the main monastery and who also enjoy a fair degree of independence as long as they function as independent economic units without depending on the main monastery. It currently serves as the head temple for the 21st district of the Jogye Order among the 25 head monasteries of the order. Songgwangsa, one of the oldest Seon temples in Korea, is still very active today as a practice center.

Over the centuries, it has been rebuilt many times and is now fully restored. As it has been the residence of many monks, the monastery has an assortment of stele and pagodas which contain the ashes of many monks. One of the oldest living quarters in Korea is located at Songgwangsa, as well as an International Seon Center that is popular with foreigners who seek the experience of living in a Seon temple. Koryo Sa, the first foreign branch of Songgwangsa, was established in Koreatown, Los Angeles, California, US in 1980 by Kusan Sunim.

== Geography ==
Songgwangsa is located on the west side of Jogyesan in Songgwang-myeon, Suncheon, South Jeolla Province, South Korea. Seonamsa, a quieter hermitage dating to 529, lies on the eastern side of Janggunbong Mountain at 884 metres (2,900 ft), also within the Jogyesan Provincial Park. Songgwangsa, located between Chongju and Maisan, is accessible via Chonju city bus or taxi.

The road that accesses Songgwangsa is flanked with giant pine trees and crosses a valley with a round pavilion bridge called Cheongnyanggak, designed as a place to rest. A stream runs at the entrance to the temple and two bridges cross this stream. One of the bridges has a unique architectural arch. Also seen near the bridge are two independent small houses detached from the main the temple. There are differing versions as to why they were built. One version is that it was meant as a storehouse to keep the mortal remains for a specified period at the request of the dead. The other version is that it was used as a dressing room by the royal family after bathing to adorn their wedding dress prior to marriage. These versions and practices have been reported on in Robert Buswell's The Zen Monastic Experience (1992).

== Etymology ==
Songgwang means "a temple in which 18 great monks will spread the teaching of Buddha", "Song" referring to the 18 great men and "Gwang" to the spreading of Buddhism.

== History ==
Little is known about the early history of Gilsangsa, a temple built during Silla on the site that is now Songgwangsa. It was built by Seon master Hyerin who also built a hermitage and lived there. It was about one hundred kan (貫) in size (about 400 square feet (37 m^{2})), and included 30 to 40 monks. As there is no information about Hyerin, Buswell (1991) states that scholars may have devised Hyerin as a legendary figure who predated the arrival of Jinul.

Gilsangsa was abandoned for over fifty years but was reconstructed over a nine-year period in the 1190s to become an important centre of Korean Buddhism and as a centre for scholarly learning of the Jeonghyegyeolsa movement. Historical records indicate that Zen Master Chinul (Son or Hwa'om Master) established Songgwangsa in 1190 on Jogyesan. There are several legends related to the origin of the temple. However, Chinul, the national master Bojo, is said to have flown a black kite made of wood in Mt. Mohu, and where it landed he named it Chirakdae, meaning "the place where a black kite landed". The mountain was later renamed as Mount Songgwang.

The monastery has had a turbulent history, affected by the Second Japanese invasion (1597–1598) and the Korean War. One of the former abbots, Sokchin, wrote an anthology in 1932 based on extant references of the history of Songgwangsa. Master Kusan (1901–1983), an important disciple of Hyobong, was ordained and resided at the temple for some time in the 1940s. It has produced 16 national preceptors.

Seokjo, during the reign of Injong of Goryeo, was said to have had grand plans to expand the temple but died before his plans could take effect. The temple was rebuilt in the 17th century when Buddhism was regaining popularity. Renovations carried out after 1988 were very elaborate and extensive with original foundations as the base structure. The refurbishing involved 14 buildings including the main hall. The uniqueness of the monastery built after 1988 is unlike that of other great monasteries.

== Architecture ==
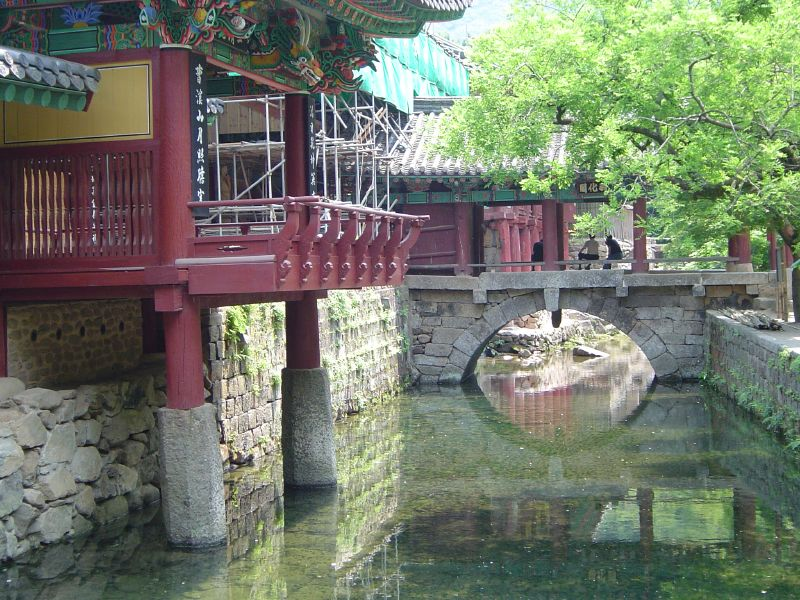
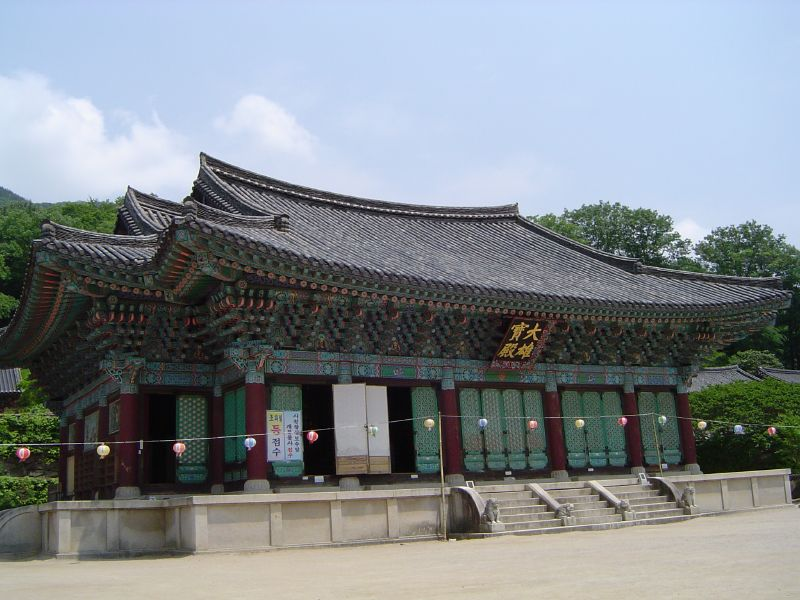
Left: The entrance to Songgwangsa Monastery. Right: The main building of Songgwangsa Monastery.

The layout plan of the monastery closely resembles the "ocean-seal chart also called the dharma-wheel chart", said to be a diagram indicative of the Korean doctrine of Hwa'om.

The elevation of the main temple building (Daeungbojeon), gives a double roofed appearance. The main temple or hall (Taeung-chon, "Basilica of the Great Hero"), is accessed via a single beam gate known as an ilichu-mun, and is built in the traditional style with wooden beams. It contains a shrine of Vairocana, the Dharmakāya Buddha, and relics related to the Hwaeom school of Buddhism, illustrating the importance of this philosophy in Korean Buddhism. The main hall houses the three main statues of the past Buddha, Dīpankara Buddha, the "current" Buddha, Gautama Buddha, and the future Buddha, Maitreya. The main shrine of the central temple is about 25 feet (7.6 m) high on a wooden altar but has space surrounding it so that visiting pilgrims can circumambulate around it. The entry hall contains the statues of the four heavenly kings (sach'onwang) which act as Dharma protectors to ward off evil spirits.

To the side of the main building is the Jijangjeon, which contains a Buddha statue and the Seungbojeo, which explains its affiliation and importance to the Seon. Just below the main temple complex, which is crafted in wood, is a group of stone stelae, all measuring roughly 8 feet (2.4 m) in height, that display the history of the monastery. An ancient hitching post near this area would historically have served government officials and other eminent visitors. The nearby Drum and the Bell Tower (Chonggo-ru) houses many implements used domestically in the monastery's history. The Teaching Hall, the Masters' Portrait Hall and the residence of the Spiritual Leader are located at the highest elevation but not the main hall. Also near the Spiritual Leader's residence is a small house with a conventional chimney that dates to the 15th century, said to belong to his deputy, and believed to be "one of the oldest living quarters in Korea."

== Features ==
Several statues surround the main temple building and a giant, colourful taenghwa (scroll painting) hangs behind the main image, depicting a Buddhist pantheon. The main image deified on a wooden altar is very tall, covering the entire height from floor to the ceiling. There is also a portrait of the guardian general of Buddhism, Wita, on one of the side walls, which is akin to 16th century portraits found in China.

The temple complex has three objects of significance: the Bisari Gusi, Ssanghyangsu, and the Neunggyeonnansa. The Bisari Gusi is a large rice container made from two Chinese juniper trees and is said to have a capacity to hold rice to feed 4000 monks. Sanghyangsu takes the form of two very large Chinese juniper trees (Juniperus chinensis) and Neunggyeonnansa is a decoratively designed plate.

== Religious festivals ==
=== Buddha's Birthday ===
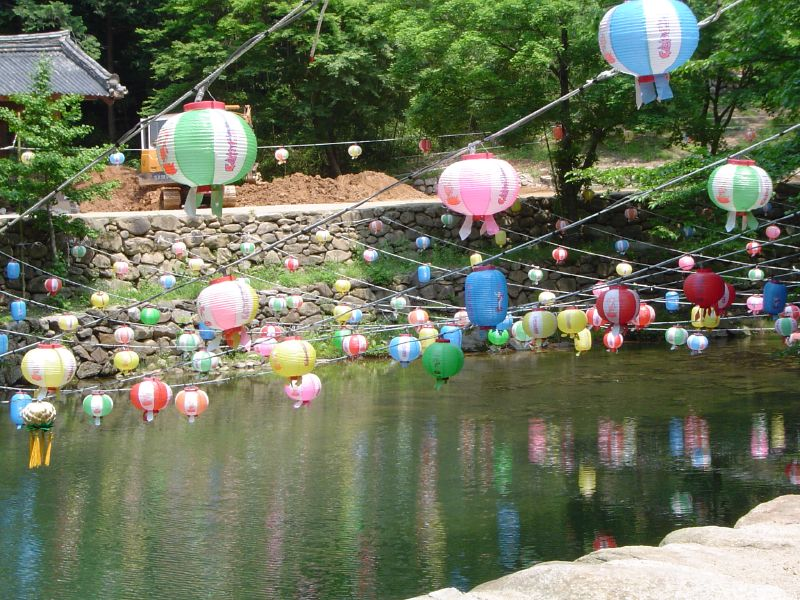
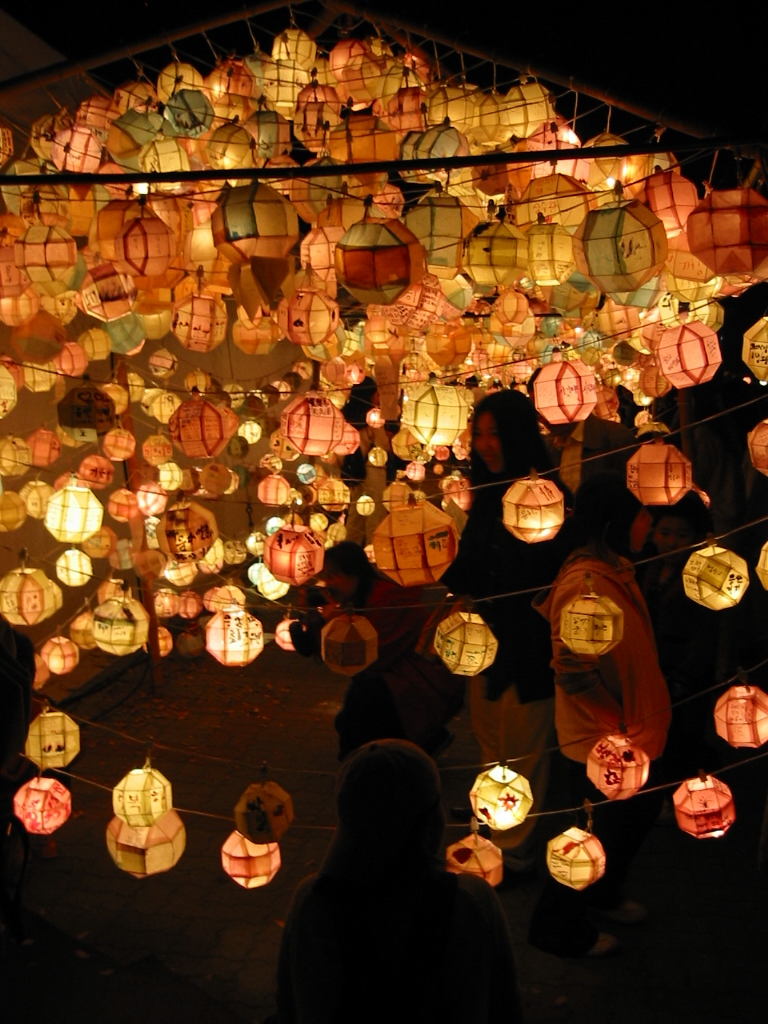
Left: Lantern decoration during Buddha's birthday celebrations in Songgwangsa Monastery. Right: A typical scene of the Lotus lantern festival in Korea

Buddha's Birthday (Bucheonim oshin nal) festival is a gala annual festival that is celebrated in all Buddhist monasteries in Korea on the eighth day of the fourth lunar month (usually corresponds Gregorian calendar month of early May) which corresponds to two weeks prior to the start of the summer retreat. On this occasion, paper lanterns or lamps with candles are lit which are strung around all the shrines within the monastery and in series of rows in the central courtyard. The most ornate type of lantern is the lotus flower type. These are usually professionally made by monastics from the subsidiary monasteries of Songgwangsa. The lanterns are also put up for sale at the main entrance of the monastery. According to a learned monk of the Songgwangsa monastery, the practice of lantern lighting is related to the Jataka tales which depicts the Buddha's past lives. The largest lamps inside the main shrine hall have been dedicated in the past by the late President Park Chung-hee and his wife. Food offerings for lunch and dinner at an improvised altar and dharma lectures are a common feature on this occasion. The Songgwangsa will be open to the public is on this day. That is, only once a year when monks are seen holding guard at all the shrines and halls of the monastery, with the exception of the main meditation hall and the private rooms of the monks which are barred for public viewing. The offering of lamps is considered a meritorious deed as it is said, "If someone, wanting to make merit, respectfully offers a bright lamp or even a small candle before the Buddha images enshrined inside a stupa or shrine …, that merit can not be comprehended by any of the śrāvakas or pratyekabuddhas; only the Buddhas, Tathagatas can comprehend it."

In the evening, lighting ceremony is held when lay people who have bought lamps or lanterns light them by placing a candle inside the lantern, at about 7.30 PM. The lighted lamps are a delightful sight to behold, walking around the monastery or viewing from the top of a nearby hill. The lamps are later dimmed to mark the end of the ceremony.

=== New Year day ===
Another notable festival is the New Year (sollal) day that is observed with piety and gaiety, according to the Solar calendar in late January or early February, every year. The festival, which starts with New Year's Eve lasts for three days.

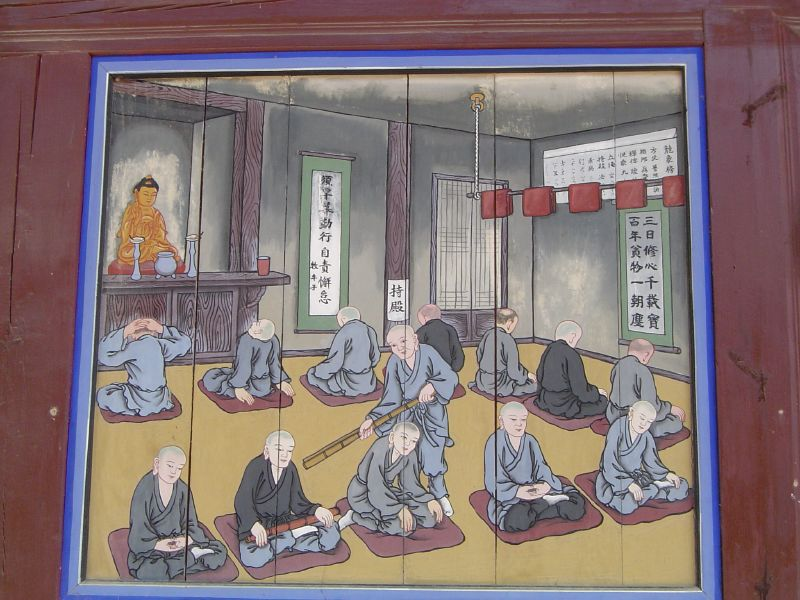
Painting of Meditation in the main hall

=== Meditations ===
Apart from the festivals, the monastery observes two meditation seasons, which are an integral feature of Korean Buddhism, in the tradition of the historical Buddha; both are two 3-month meditation seasons, one in winter and the other in summer, scheduled according to the lunar calendar. Normally, 120 monks attend these meditations, which are still practiced in Korean Buddhism. The number of resident monks attending the meditation practices fluctuates according to season, and generally there are about 120 monks during meditation seasons and 70 monks during the off seasons. During this period monks meditate for 12 hours, and even more severe order of continuous 24 hours period of meditation is observed with the objective of creating and also building impetus and energy for achieving progress on the path of enlightenment.

== See also ==
- Buddhism in Korea
- Korean Buddhist temples
- T'aenghwa
- Temple Stay
- Three Jewel Temples of Korea
- List of Buddhist temples
- Martine Batchelor
- Hyunoong Sunim

== Bibliography ==
- Buswell, Robert E. (29 November 1993). The Zen Monastic Experience: Buddhist Practice in Contemporary Korea. Princeton University Press. pp. 49–64. ISBN 978-0-691-03477-5.
