= Taego Bou =

Korean Buddhist leader (1301–1383)

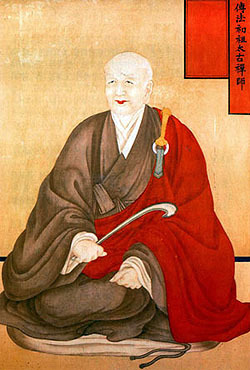
Taego Bou painting from the 19th century

Taego Bou (Korean: 태고보우; Hanja: 太古普愚, 23 October 1301 – 27 January 1383), alternatively romanized as Taego Bowoo or Taego Bowu, was a Korean Seon master who lived in Goryeo, was the cofounder of the Jogye Order with Jinul, and is credited as the founder of the modern Taego Order.

He entered into the monastery at 13, and at 25 passed the examination. He practiced at a temple in the mountains north of Seoul. In 1346 he visited China for two years, and trained under Shiwu. Upon returning to Korea, he adopted the precepts of Pai Chang, and under the auspices of Gongmin of Goryeo, he opened a new Buddhist administration office. His sect remained small in number, and receded shortly after his death.

According to tradition, he unified five different branches of Buddhism and nine different Seon lineages into a single order which still continues. For his efforts, he was appointed as a supreme patriarch for the dynasty. This helped set the standard for Korean Buddhism by bringing both doctrinal and practice-oriented sects together under a single umbrella.

== Popular culture ==
- Portrayed by Jung Min in the 1983 KBS1 TV series Foundation of the Kingdom
