= Jeonghyegyeolsa =

Korean Buddhist movement

Jeonghyegyeolsa (“Correct Wisdom Society”) was a Buddhism movement. It was dedicated to the pursuing of Samadhi. It was moved by Jinul who established a new tradition of the Korean Buddhism.
