= Jinul =

Korean Buddhist monk (1158–1210)

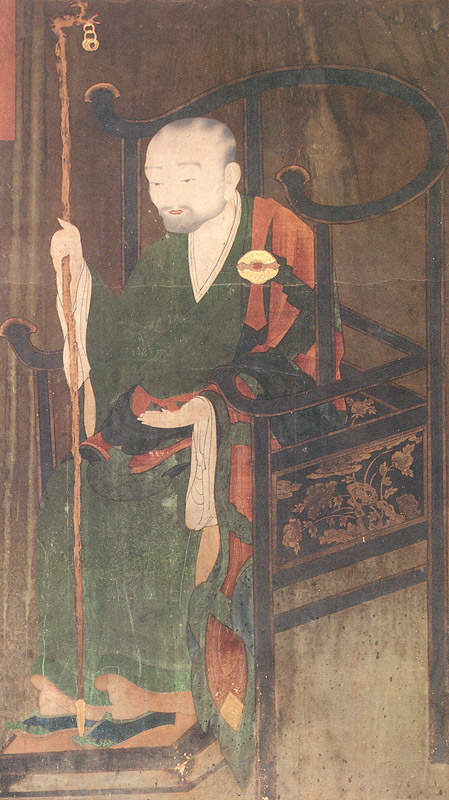
- Title: Zen Master

Personal life
- Born: 1158 Goryeo
- Died: 1210 (aged 51–52)

Religious life
- Religion: Buddhism
- School: Seon

Senior posting
- Successor: Hyesim (혜심/慧諶: 1178~1234)

Jinul Puril Bojo Daesa (Korean: 보조지눌; Hanja: 普照知訥, "Bojo Jinul" [po.dʑo dʑi.nɯɭ]; 1158–1210), often called Jinul or Chinul for short, was a Korean monk of the Goryeo period, who is considered to be the most influential figure in the formation of Korean Seon (Zen) Buddhism. He is credited as the founder of the Jogye Order, by working to unify the disparate sects in Korean Buddhism into a cohesive organization.

== Biography ==
Bojo Jinul's birthname was Jeong and by age 15 he left his family to be ordained under Seon Master Jonghwi of the Sagulsan School, one of the nine mountain schools of Seon, receiving the ordination name "Jinul". This occurred in 1173. Regarding his training, Buswell observes:

"The young monk's relationship with his preceptor does not seem to have been especially close, for his biographer states that he never had a permanent teacher. Chinul's intellect and his natural inclination toward solitude and retreat had been noticeable since his youth; with the fractious climate of the church in his days, he probably felt more comfortable learning to get along on his own considerable talents in seclusion. From early on in his vocation Chinul made up for the lack of personal instruction by drawing inspiration from the Buddhist scriptures. In the spirit of self-reliance that is central to Buddhism, he took responsibility for his own spiritual development and followed the path of practice outlined in the scriptures and confirmed through his own Sŏn meditation. Chinul's progress in Buddhist practice was, therefore, based on using scriptural instructions to perfect formal Sŏn practice."

By 1182, Jinul passed the royal examination for monks and qualified for a higher administrative position, but turned it down to join the Seon sangha at Bojesa in Pyongyang. The community being uninterested in his efforts to reform the retreat community, he moved to Cheongwonsa at Changpyeong, then Bomunsa on Hagasan.

During this period of travel and study, Jinul was said to have studied the entire Tripiṭaka and had a series of awakenings. Jinul sought to establish a new movement within Korean Seon which he called the "samadhi and prajñā society" (정혜사; 定慧社; Jeonghyesa). This movement's goal was to establish a new community of disciplined, pure-minded practitioners deep in the mountains. Jinul eventually accomplished this mission with the founding of Songgwangsa on Jogyesan, and in the process the Jogye Order, which taught a comprehensive approach to Buddhism including meditation, doctrine, chanting and lectures. By 1209, he completed his magnum opus the Excerpts from the Dharma Collection and Special Practice Record with Personal Notes (법집별행록절요병입사기; 法集別行錄節要幷入私記; beopjip pyeolhaeng nok cheolyo byeongip sagi), an extensive exploration of various schools of Chan Buddhism in China, with extensive commentaries on the writings of the Chinese monk Guifeng Zongmi as well as personal notes.

This earned him the respect of the Goryeo, and in particular King Huijong, who ordered that Mount Songgwangsan be renamed Jogyesan in his honor. Upon his death in 1210, he was given a posthumous title of honor by King Huijong as well.

== Teachings ==
=== Essence-Function ===
Essence-Function (체용; 體用) is a key concept of Korean Buddhism. Essence-Function takes a particular form in the philosophy and writings of Jinul.

=== View of Nirvana ===
Jinul viewed Nirvana as a sublime essence that is present in all beings. This essence is the very nature of Buddha and has always been present in beings. Writing on the faith in such matters held by his own school, Jinul states:

Right faith in the patriarchal sect ... does not believe in conditioned causes or effects. Rather, it stresses faith that everyone is originally a Buddha, that everyone possesses the impeccable self-nature, and that the sublime essence of nirvana is complete in everyone. There is no need to search elsewhere; since time immemorial, it has been innate in everyone.

Jinul further believed that the true nature of all people is unchanging and that their minds are ultimately numinous and marked by awareness, even when seemingly in a state of delusion. In a discussion of Buddhist schools, he writes:

In the present condensation, I treat the school of Ho-tse first, primarily so that people who are practicing meditation will be able to awaken first to the fact that, whether deluded or awakened, their own minds are numinous, aware, and never dark and their nature is unchanging.

== See also ==
- Korean philosophy
