= Korean Seon =

Korean school of Mahayana Buddhism

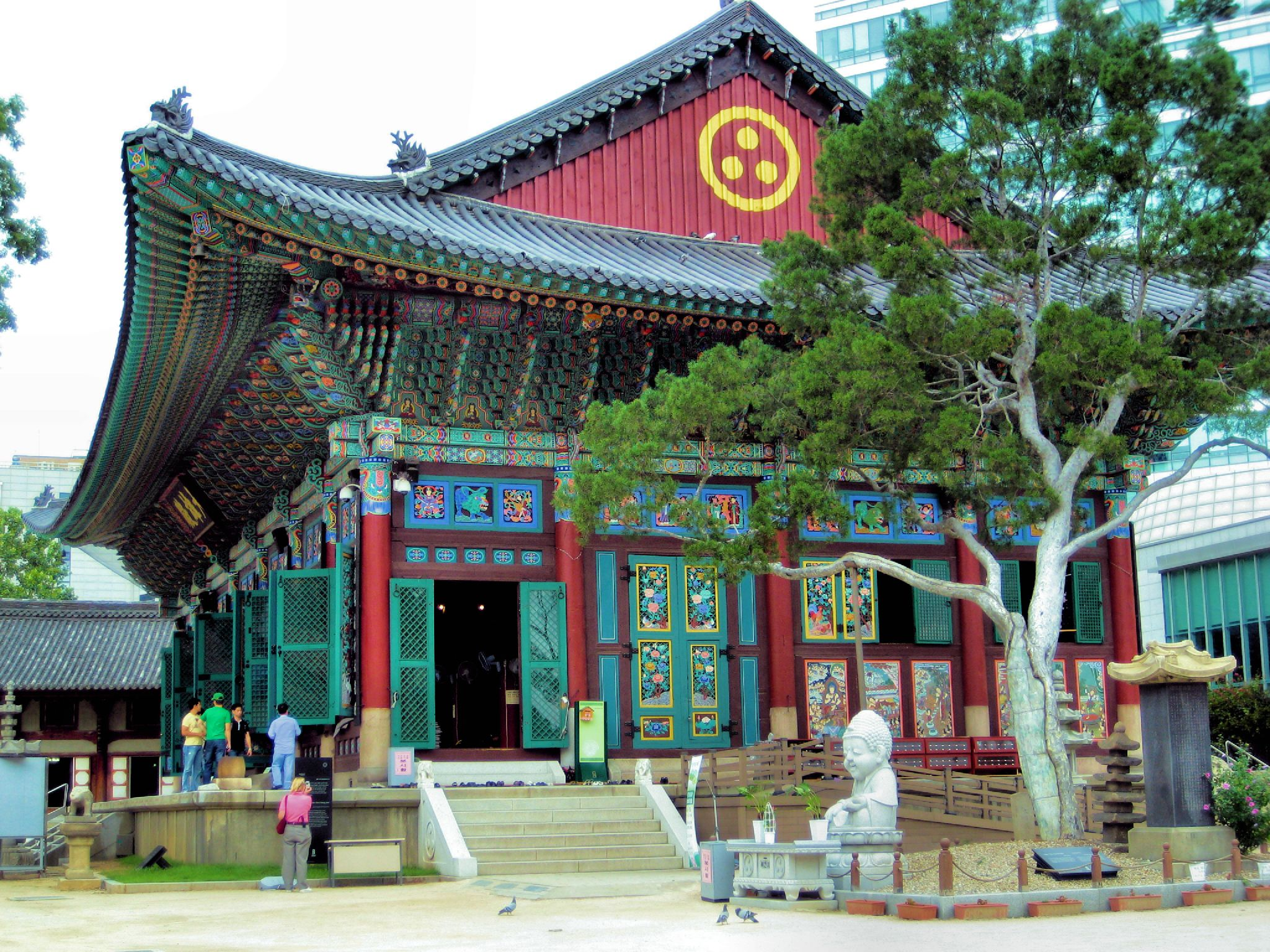
Jogyesa Temple Seon temple in Seoul, South Korea

Seon or Korean Zen Buddhism (Korean: 선; Hanja: 禪; Korean pronunciation: [sʌn]) is the Korean name for Chan Buddhism, a branch of Mahāyāna Buddhism commonly known in English as Zen Buddhism. Seon is the Sino-Korean pronunciation of Chan, (Chinese: 禪; pinyin: chán) an abbreviation of 禪那 (chánnà), which is a Chinese transliteration of the Sanskrit word of dhyāna ("meditation"). Seon Buddhism, represented chiefly by the Jogye and Taego orders, is now the most common type of Buddhism found in Korea.

A main characteristic of Seon Buddhism is the use of the method of meditation, Ganhwa Seon(看話禪). A Korean monk, Jinul accepted partially a meditative method of Chan Buddhism in 1205. In Chan Buddhism, hwadu (화두; 話頭) is a short phrase to ground oneself during meditation. Jinul addressed a doctrine of Sagyo Yiepseon (사교입선; 捨敎入禪) that monks should live an inborn life after learning and forgetting all creeds and theories. Within the doctrine of Jinul, hwadu is the witnessing of truthful meaning in everyday life.

== History ==
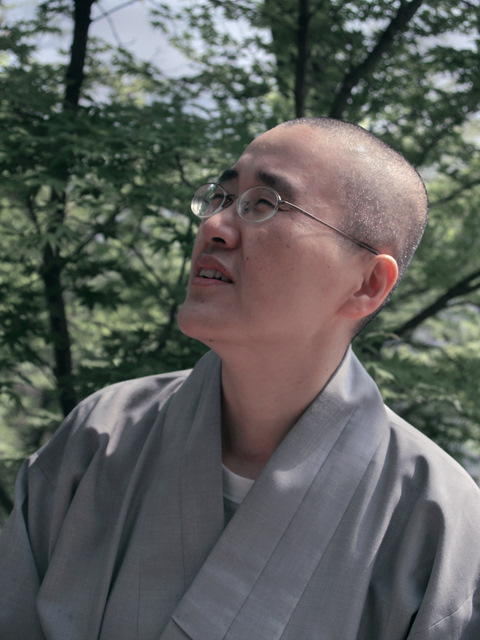
Seon bhikṣuṇī in Seoul, South Korea

During the Goryeo dynasty Jinul strongly influenced Korean Buddhism. He was the first monk to be appointed a national teacher and advisor by the king, having written a book presenting the Seon tradition from the Song dynasty. And this Seon tradition preserved well to this day, after Taego Bou brought his Dharma transmission to Goryeo.

The Joseon dynasty suppressed Buddhism in favour of Confucianism. In spite of the suppression, Hyujeong wrote about the three religions (Seon Buddhism, Confucianism, Taoism) in the Joseon dynasty from Seon point of view. He also succeeded to the Dharma transmission. During the Japanese invasions of Korea (1592–98), Hyujeong and Yujeong commanded guerrilla units of monks and took part in diplomacy.

Under annexation by Japan most monks were forced to marry. This lasted about 40 years until the act of purification. During those times, masters like Gyoengheo and Mangong kept Dharma transmission alive.

Entering into the 21st century a common saying in the Korean Buddhist community is "남진제 북송담'(南眞際 北松潭) (Jinje in the south, Songdam in the north).", which refers to the influence of two great Seon masters characterizing this period, namely Jinje and Songdam. Other relevant monks are Seungsahn and Daewon.

=== Unified Silla Period (668–935) ===
==== Transmission of Chan to Korea ====
Chan was transmitted into Unified Silla (668–935). Beomnang (法朗; fl. 632–646), who studied with the Fourth Patriarch Dayi Daoxin, was the first to bring the teachings to Korea. Beomnang transmitted his teachings to Sinhaeng (神行; 704–779), who also studied in China. Sinhaeng studied with Puji (651–739), a successor of Yuquan Shenxiu, the head of the East Mountain Teaching of Chan. Seon was further popularized by Doui (道義) at the beginning of the ninth century.

==== Nine Schools ====
Seon was gradually further transmitted into Korea, as Korean monks of predominantly Hwaeom and Yogacara background began to travel to China to study the Hongzhou school of Mazu Daoyi and his successors and the Rinzai school of Linji Yixuan. Mazu's successors had numerous Korean students, some of whom returned to Korea and established their own schools at various mountain monasteries with their leading disciples.

Initially, the number of these schools was fixed at nine. Seon was termed the nine mountain schools" at the time. Eight of these were of the lineage of Mazu Daoyi (馬祖道一), as they were established through connection with either him or one of his eminent disciples. The one exception was the Sumi-san school founded by Yieom (利嚴), which had developed from the Caodong school.

Doui (道義 ), who studied with Zhizang and Baizhang Huaihai is regarded as the first patriarch of Seon. He founded the Gaji Mountain school (迦智山宗 Gajisanjong). The Nine mountain Schools adopted the name Jogye Order in 826. The first record of the Nine Mountains school dates from 1084.

=== Goryeo Dynasty (918–1392) ===
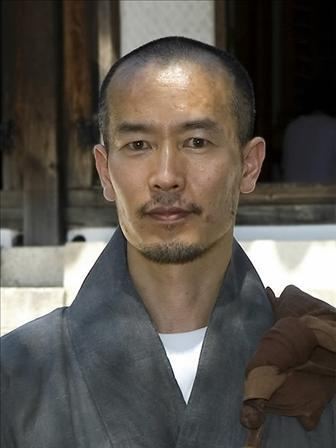
Korean bhikṣu of the Seon school

==== Tension ====
By the eleventh century Seon Buddhism became established in Korea. It distinguished itself from the existing Five Schools (Note: Gyeyuljong (Vinaya school), Yeolbanjong (Nirvāna school), Pŏpsŏng chong (Dharma Nature school), Hwaeomjong (Huayen school), and Beopsangjong (Yogācāra school).) and their scriptural emphasis. Tension developed between the new meditational schools and the previously existing scholastic schools, which were described by the term gyo, meaning "learning" or "study". Efforts were needed to attain mutual understanding and rapprochement between Seon and these scholastic schools.

==== Jinul ====
The most important figure of Goryeo-era Seon was Jinul, who established a reform movement in Korea. In his time, the sangha was in a crisis of external appearance and internal issues of doctrine. Buddhism was seen as infected by secular tendencies and involvements, such as fortune-telling and the offering of prayers and rituals for success in secular endeavors. This perceived corruption was seen to create a profusion of monks and nuns with questionable motives. Therefore, the correction, revival, and improvement of the quality of Buddhism were prominent issues for Buddhist leaders of the period.

Jinul sought to establish a new movement within Korean Seon, which he called the "samādhi and prajñā society". Its goal was to establish a new community of disciplined, pure-minded practitioners deep in the mountains. He eventually accomplished this mission with the founding of the Songgwangsa at Jogyesan as a new center of pure practice.

Jinul's works are characterized by a thorough analysis and reformulation of the methodologies of Seon study and practice. He laid an equal emphasis on doctrinal teaching and Seon practice. One major issue that had long fermented in Chan, and which received special focus from Jinul, was the relationship between "gradual" and "sudden" methods in practice and enlightenment. Drawing upon various Chinese treatments of this topic, most importantly those by Guifeng Zongmi and Dahui Zonggao, Jinul created Pojo Seon, a "sudden enlightenment followed by gradual practice" dictum, which he outlined in a few relatively concise and accessible texts. Jinul incorporated Dahui Zonggao's gwanhwa (觀話; guān huà, "observing the critical phrase") into his practice. This form of meditation is the main method taught in Korean Seon today.

Jinul's philosophical resolution of the Seon-Gyo conflict brought a deep and lasting effect on Korean Buddhism.

==== Hyesim ====
Jinul's successor, Jingak Hyesim (혜심/慧諶) further emphasized the hwadu (Ch. huatou, "word head" or "critical phrase") practice. He collected 1,125 gongans in his Seonmun yeomsongjip ("The Collection of Verses and Cases", 1226). Hyesim encouraged male practitioners to practice hwadu, whereas women's Buddhist practice was limited to chanting and sūtra-readings.

==== Jogye Order ====
It was during the time of Jinul that the Jogye Order, a Seon sect, became the predominant form of Korean Buddhism, a status it still holds. Taego Bou studied the Linji school in China and returned to unite the Nine Mountain Schools.

There would be a series of important Seon teachers during the next several centuries, such as Hyegeun (혜근; 慧勤), Taego Bou, Gihwa and Hyujeong, who continued to develop the basic mold of Korean meditational Buddhism established by Jinul.

=== Joseon (1392–1897) ===
==== Suppression ====
At the end of Goryeo and during Joseon the Jogye Order was combined with the scholarly schools. It lost influence under the ruling class, which embraced neo-Confucianism. Buddhism was gradually suppressed for the next 500 years. The number of temples was reduced, restrictions on membership in the sangha were installed, and Buddhist monks and nuns were literally chased into the mountains, forbidden to mix with society. Joseon Buddhism was first condensed to Seon and Gyo. Eventually, these were further reduced to the single school of Seon.

Giwha wrote an important treatise in defense of Buddhism, the Hyeonjeong non. In the tradition of earlier philosophers, he applied Essence-Function and Hwaeom (sa-sa mu-ae, "mutual interpenetration of phenomena").

During Joseon, the number of Buddhist monasteries dropped from several hundred to a mere thirty-six. Limits were placed on the number of clergy, land area, and ages for entering the sangha. When the final restrictions were in place, monks and nuns were prohibited from entering the cities. Buddhist funerals, and even begging, were outlawed. A few rulers temporarily lifted the more suppressive regulations. The most noteworthy of these was the Queen Munjeong. The queen had deep respect for the monk Bou (보우, 普雨), and installed him as the head of the Seon school.

==== Seosan ====
Buddhist monks helped in repelling the Japanese invasions of Korea (1592–98). Monks were organized into guerrilla units, which enjoyed some instrumental successes. The "righteous monk" (義士; uisa) movement was led by Hyujeong, a Seon master and the author of a number of important religious texts. The presence of the monks' army was a critical factor in the eventual expulsion of the Japanese invaders.

Seosan made efforts toward the unification of Buddhist doctrinal study and practice. He was strongly influenced by Wonhyo, Jinul, and Giwha. He is considered the central figure in the revival of Joseon Buddhism, and most major streams of modern Korean Seon trace their lineages back to him through one of his four main disciples: Yujeong; Eongi, Taeneung and Ilseon, all four of whom were lieutenants to Seosan during the war with Japan.

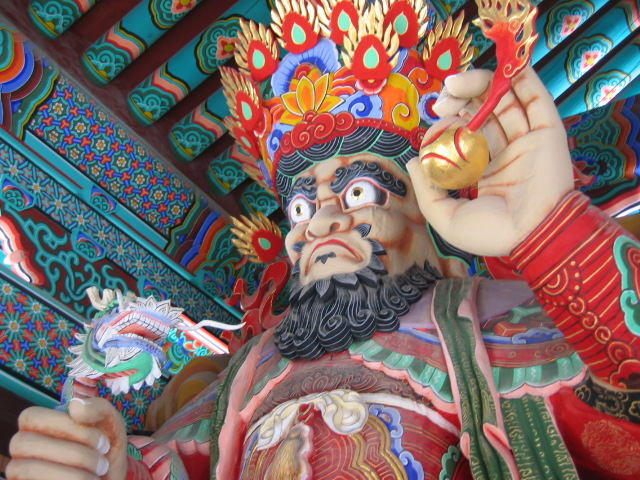
Statue of one of the Four Heavenly Kings

==== Late Joseon Kingdom ====
Buddhism during the three centuries, from the time of Seosan down to the next Japanese incursion into Korea in the late nineteenth century, did not change very much. The Buddhism of the late Joseon Kingdom saw a revival of Hwaeom studies. There was also a revival of Pure Land Buddhism.

=== Korean Empire (1897–1910) and Japanese annexation (1910–1945) ===
With the Korean Empire started the Gwangmu Reform, the modernization of Korea. The Korean Empire ended in 1910, when Korea was annexed by Japan.

Korean monks studied in Japan, where they were influenced by modern Japanese scholars who introduced western ideas into their studies. Via those Korean monks western ideas were also introduced in Korean Buddhism, and a bifurcation developed between monks and scholars.

=== Division of Korea (1945–present) ===
After the Second World War the United Nations developed plans for a trusteeship administration, the Soviet Union administering the peninsula north of the 38th parallel and the United States administering the south. The politics of the Cold War resulted in the 1948 establishment of two separate governments, North Korea and South Korea.

==== Contemporary Seon ====
Since the middle of the 20th century Christianity has competed with Buddhism in South Korea, while religious practice has been suppressed in North Korea.

Seon continues to be practiced in Korea today at a number of major monastic centers, as well as being taught at Dongguk University, which has a major of studies in this religion. The largest Buddhist denomination is the Jogye Order.

In the 1980s a debate arose about "sudden" versus "gradual" enlightenment". Since Jinul Korean Seon was based on the integration of practice and scholarly study in the slogan "sudden enlightenment, gradual cultivation". The modern Korean Seon master Seongcheol revived the slogan "sudden enlightenment, sudden cultivation", ascribed to Huineng. The last three Supreme Patriarchs of the Jogye Order have a stance in this debate that is in accordance with Seongcheol.

== Democratic features ==
Stuart Lachs observes that Seon places less stress on the figure of the teacher than does Japanese Zen, which is more hierarchical. In Korean Seon, the role of pangjang, the equivalent of roshi, is an elected position with an initial ten year term limit. Pangjangs can also be recalled by a vote. Lachs feels this model is instructive, as it would remove much of the hierarchy and idealization of the teacher so prevalent in American Zen centers, which follow more the Japanese style.

According to Robert Buswell, in Korean Seon, the "master-student relationship is not nearly as formal and restrictive as we might suspect from most Western accounts of the Zen tradition. [...] Few [monks] develop a deep personal rapport with a single teacher. A monk's affinities are really more with his fellow meditation monks, rather than with a specific master. [...] In this way, Buddhist thought and practice is kept separate from the person of the master; a monk learns from many teachers, but does not take any one person's version of the dharma to be definitive."

== Spread in the United States ==
Korean Seon has been spread in the US by Seungsahn. He was a temple abbot in Seoul and after living in Hong Kong and Japan, he moved to the US in 1972, not speaking any English. On the flight to Los Angeles, a Korean American passenger offered him a job at a laundry in Providence, Rhode Island, which became headquarters of Seung Sahn's Kwan Um School of Zen. Shortly after arriving in Providence, he attracted students and founded the Providence Zen Center. The Kwan Um School has more than 100 Zen centers on six continents.

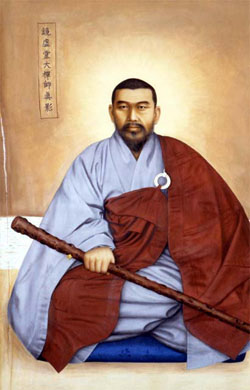
Kyong Ho

Another Korean Zen teacher, Samu Sunim, founded Toronto's Zen Buddhist Temple in 1971. He is head of the Buddhist Society for Compassionate Wisdom, which has temples in Ann Arbor, Chicago, Mexico City, and New York City.

In the early 20th century, Master Kyongho, re-energized Korean Seon. At the end of World War II, his disciple, Master Mann Gong, proclaimed that lineage Dharma should be transmitted worldwide to encourage peace through enlightenment. Consequently, his Dharma successor, Hye Am brought lineage Dharma to the United States. Hye Am's Dharma successor, Myo Vong founded the Western Son Academy (1976), and his Korean disciple, Pohwa Sunim, founded World Zen Fellowship (1994) which includes various Zen centers in the United States, such as the Potomac Zen Sangha, the Patriarchal Zen Society and the Baltimore Zen Center.
