= Jogyesan =

Mountain in South Jeolla Province, South Korea

Coordinates: 35°00′09″N 127°18′49″E

Highest point
- Elevation: 887 m (2,910 ft)

Geography
- Location: South Jeolla Province, South Korea

Korean name
- Hangul: 조계산
- Hanja: 曹溪山
- RR: Jogyesan
- MR: Chogyesan

Jogyesan, or Mount Jogye, is a mountain of South Jeolla Province in southwestern South Korea. It has an elevation of 887 meters (2,910 ft). It is the main attraction of Mount Jogye Provincial Park (조계산도립공원).

It takes its name from the namesake Jogye Order which founded a key monastery, Songgwangsa (송광사/松廣寺), therein.

Beside the Songgwangsa, Jogyesan is also home to Seonamsa, an important monastery of the Taego Order (태고종/太古宗), a splinter group of the Jogye.

== See also ==
- List of mountains of Korea
