= Li Tongxuan =

Tang dynasty Buddhist scholar

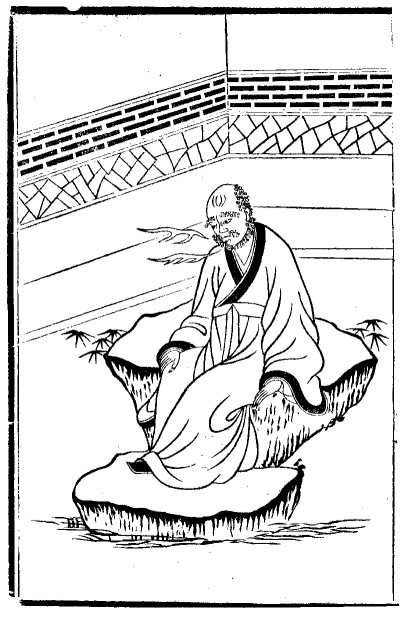
Li Tongxuan

Li Tongxuan (Chinese: 李通玄) (635–730) was a lay Chinese Buddhist scholar and meditation master of the Huayan school.

== Background ==
Li Tongxuan was the lesser known contemporary of the great Huayan scholar Fazang. Li is known for his exegetical writings on the Huayan Sutra (Avatamsaka Sutra), including his commentary entitled Xin Huayan Jing Lun (新華嚴經論, Treatise on the new translation of the Avatamsaka Sutra).

In his commentary to the Huayan sutra, Li argues that all sentient beings already have the same qualities possessed by a Buddha and thus, he sees the Huayan teaching as a sudden teaching which reveals the Buddhahood that is immanent in all beings. Part of Li's subitist view is his non-temporal understanding of reality, which sees temporal divisions as unreal and sees all of reality as being "the one true dharma-realm" (Ch. yi zhen fajie). Because reality is all the one single dharmadhatu, there is no duality between Buddhas and living beings, no dualism between buddhahood and samsara, awakening and ignorance, or sacred and secular.

Li also drew on non-buddhist Chinese philosophy, including the Book of Changes. He also argues that Chinese sages like Laozi and Confucius also taught the way of the bodhisattvas.

Li also wrote other works, like Jueyi lun 決疑論 (Treatise on Resolving Doubts, 4 fascicles) and the Shiming lun 十明論 (Treatise on the Ten Knowledges, 1 fascicle).

Li developed a unique meditative practice called "the contemplation of Buddhalight" (foguang guan) based on the 9th chapter of the Avatamsaka sutra. This method focused on tracing the universal light of the Buddha which is present in one's mind and expanding the contemplation further and further outwards until it fills the entire universe.

Li's writings were especially influential on Chan, Zen and Seon Buddhism. His work was influential on numerous later Buddhist figures like Jinul, Myoe and Dahui Zonggao (1089–1163).
