= Huayan =

Tradition in East Asian Buddhism

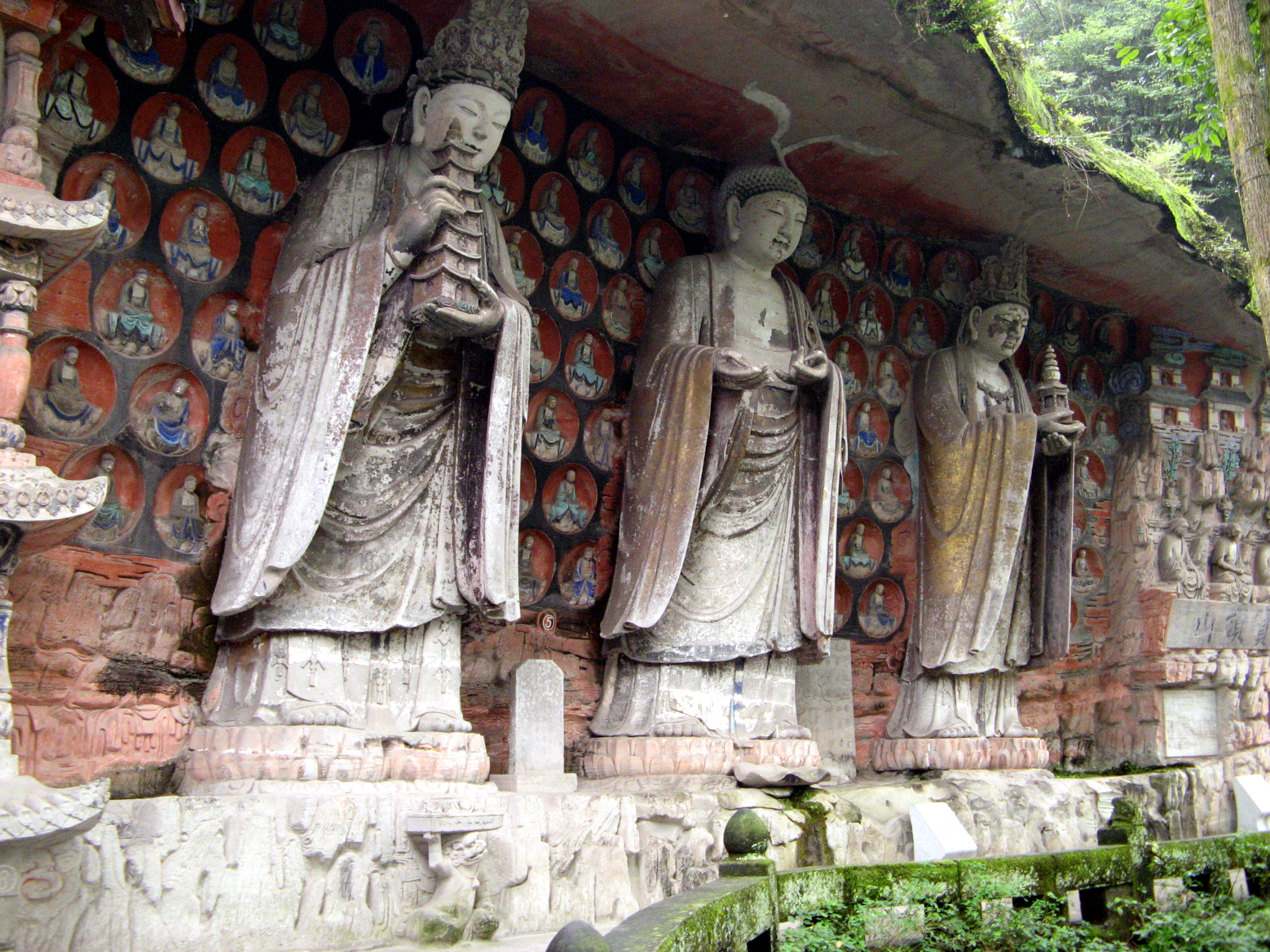
- The Three Worthies of Huayan (Manjushri (left), Vairocana (center), and Samantabhadra (right)), a triad venerated in Huayan – Dazu Rock Carvings, Chongqing, China

Chinese name
- Chinese: 华严宗
- Traditional Chinese: 華嚴宗
Transcriptions
Standard Mandarin
- Hanyu Pinyin: Huáyán zōng
- Wade–Giles: Hua-yen tsung
Yue: Cantonese
- Jyutping: Fa^{4}-yim^{4} zung^{1}
Southern Min
- Tâi-lô: Hua-ngiam tsong

Vietnamese name
- Vietnamese alphabet: Hoa Nghiêm tông
- Chữ Hán: 華嚴宗

Korean name
- Hangul: 화엄종
- Hanja: 華嚴宗
Transcriptions
- Revised Romanization: Hwaeomjong
- McCune–Reischauer: Hwaŏmjong

Japanese name
- Kanji: 華厳宗
- Kana: けごん しゅう
Transcriptions
- Romanization: Kegon-shū

Sanskrit name
- Sanskrit: Avataṃsaka

The Huayan school of Buddhism (traditional Chinese: 華嚴; simplified Chinese: 华严; pinyin: Huáyán, Wade–Giles: Hua-Yen, "Flower Garland," from the Sanskrit "Avataṃsaka") is a Mahayana Buddhist tradition that developed in China during the Tang dynasty (618–907). The Huayan worldview is based primarily on the Buddhāvataṃsaka Sūtra (Chinese: 華嚴經; pinyin: Huáyán jīng, Flower Garland Sūtra) as well as on the works of Huayan patriarchs, like Zhiyan (602–668), Fazang (643–712), Chengguan (738–839), Zongmi (780–841) and Li Tongxuan (635–730).

Another name for this tradition is the Xianshou school (賢首, Xianshou being another name for patriarch Fazang). The Huayan School is known as Hwaŏm in Korea, Kegon in Japan and Hoa Nghiêm in Vietnam.

The Huayan tradition considers the Flower Garland Sūtra to be the ultimate teaching of the Buddha. It also draws on other sources, like the Mahayana Awakening of Faith, and the Madhyamaka and Yogacara philosophies. Huayan teachings, especially its doctrines of universal interpenetration, nature origination (which sees all phenomena as arising from a single ontological source), and the omnipresence of Buddhahood, were very influential on Chinese Buddhism and also on the rest of East Asian Buddhism. Huayan thought was especially influential on Chan (Zen) Buddhism, and some scholars even see Huayan as the main Buddhist philosophy behind Chan/Zen.

== History ==
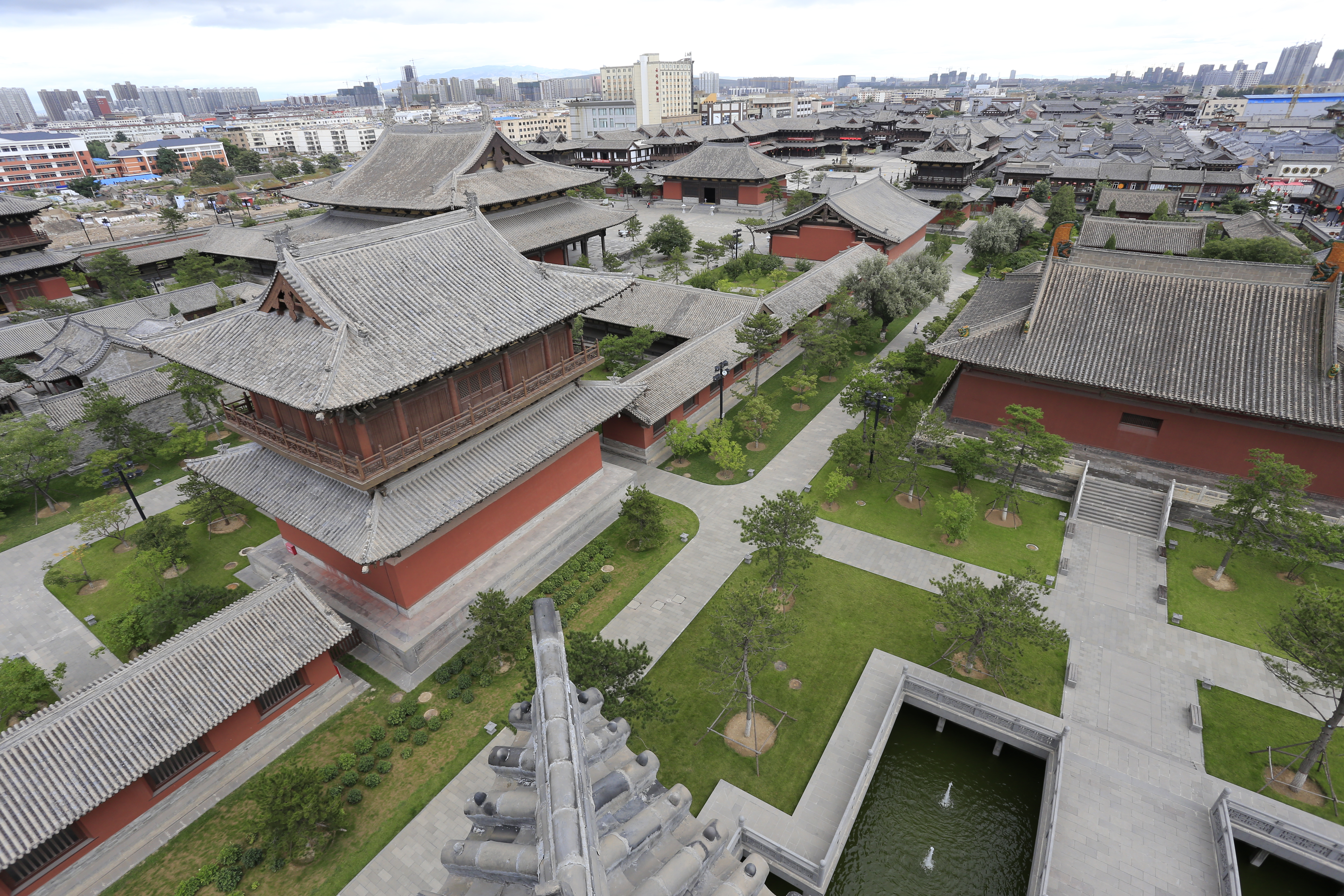
Aerial view of Huayan Temple, Datong, built during the Jin dynasty (1115–1234)

=== Origins of the Chinese Avataṃsaka tradition ===
The Buddhāvataṃsaka Sūtra (The Garland of Buddhas Sūtra, or The Multitude of Buddhas Sūtra) is a compilation of sūtras of various length, some of which originally circulated as independent works before being combined into the "full" Avataṃsaka. One of the earliest of these texts, the Ten Stages Sūtra (Daśabhūmika), may date from the first century CE. These various sūtras were probably joined shortly before its translation into Chinese, at the beginning of the 5th century CE.

There are various versions of the Chinese Avataṃsaka (Chinese: Huāyán Jīng 華嚴經, "Splendid Flower Adornment Sūtra"). The full sūtra was translated into Chinese three times (in versions of 40, 60, and 80 fascicles or "scrolls," 卷). The earliest Chinese texts associated with the Avataṃsaka are the Dousha jing (Taisho 280), produced by Lokaksema (fl. 147–189) in the latter part of the second century CE, and the Pusa benye jing (Book of the Original Acts that Adorn the Bodhisattva, T. 281), translated by Zhi Qian (fl. c. 220–257 CE) in the early to mid third century. There is evidence that these smaller or partial Avataṃsaka sūtras circulated on their own as individual scriptures.

As soon as the large Huāyán Sūtra appeared in China, an exegetical tradition grew up around the text in order to explain it. The first translation of the larger Huāyán Sūtra (in 60 fascicles) is often dated to the Southern Dynasties era (c. 420–589), when a translation team led by Gandharan master Buddhabhadra produced a full Chinese translation of the text. There is also evidence of a Huāyán Sūtra tradition in the Northern Dynasties (386–581) era. The Avataṃsaka teachings are associated with figures like Xuangao (402–444) who led a community with Daorong at Binglingsi cave, and Zhidan (c. 429–490), who argued that only the Huāyán Sūtra teaches the "sudden teaching" (while other Mahayana texts teach the gradual teaching).

Xuangao, a disciple of Buddhabhadra, was associated with the teaching of the "Huāyán Samadhi" which is said to have been passed on to him by Buddhabhadra. According to Hamar, Xuangao's tradition is a precursor to the Huayan school and may have even composed the apocryphal Brahma's Net Sūtra (Fanwang Jing T1484). Xuangao's tradition is also associated with Chinese meditation cave grottoes such as the Yungang Grottoes, Maijishan Grottoes and the Bingling Temple Grottoes.

The origins of some of the teachings of the Huāyán school proper can also be traced back to the Dilun school, which was based on the Shidijing lun (十地經論), Vasubandhu's commentary to the Daśabhūmikā-sūtra (which is part of the Avataṃsaka Sūtra) translated by Bodhiruci and Ratnamati. Dilun figures like Ratnamati's disciple Huiguang (468–537) emphasized the study of the entire Avataṃsaka and Dilun masters likely had their own commentaries on the text (but none have survived in full). Only a few extracts remain, such as parts of Huiguang's commentary and parts of Lingyu's (518–605).

Lingbian (靈辨, 477–522) was another early figure who studied and commented on the Avataṃsaka. He is referred to by Fazang as a great devotee of Manjushri, and 12 fascicles of Lingbian's commentary to the Avataṃsaka survive, being the earliest significant Chinese commentary on the Avataṃsaka which is extant. Jingying Huiyuan (523–592) was another prominent Dasabhūmika master in the North. Huiyuan's lineage was a major force in transmitting the Dasabhūmika tradition in Chang'an during the early Sui dynasty. Other monks like Pu'an also focused on Huayan sūtra study during the Sui. The integration of different Huayan sūtra lineages at Zhixiang temple became a key base for the future Huayan School.

=== Tang dynasty patriarchs ===
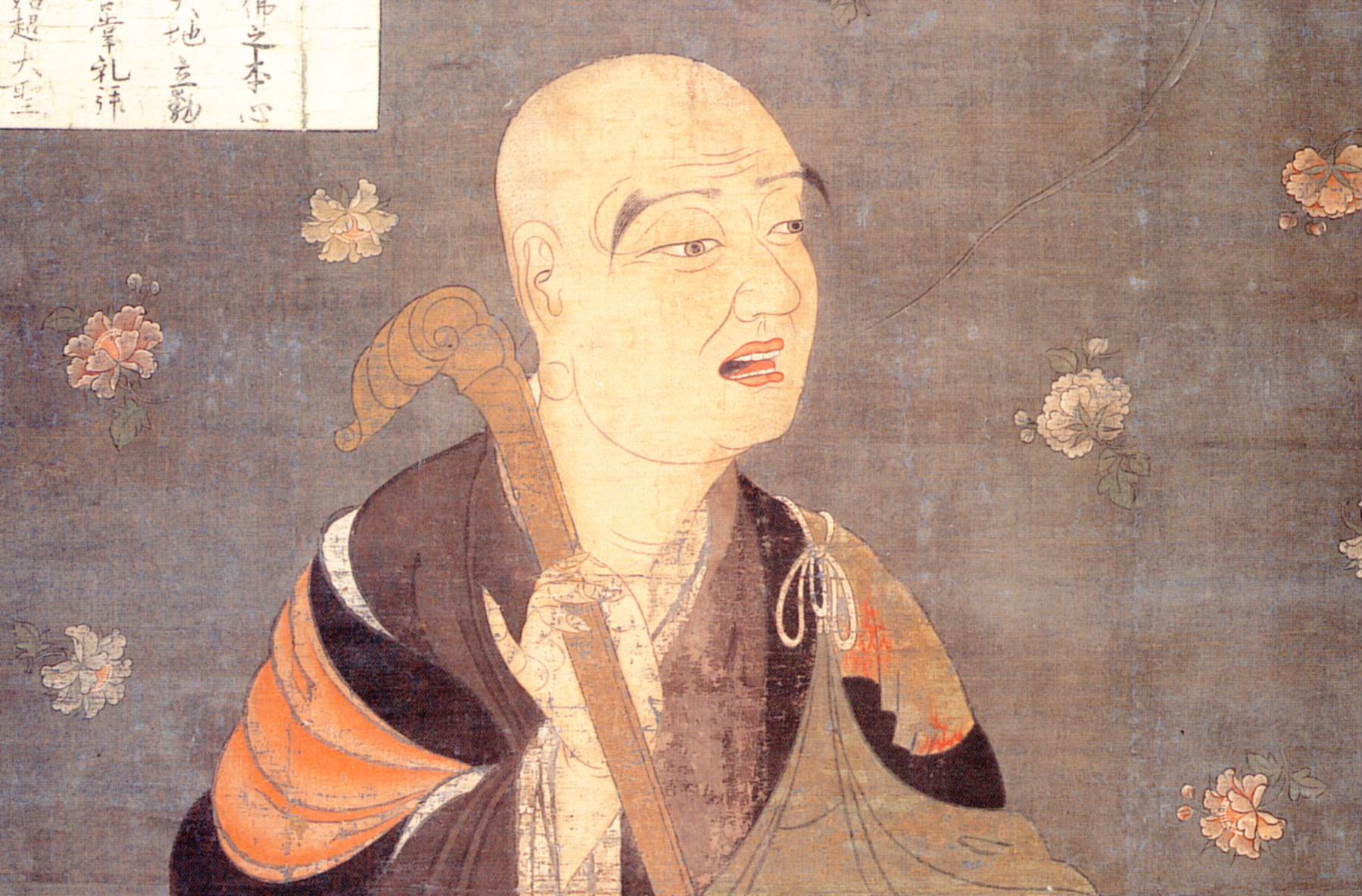
13th century Japanese print of Fazang, Todaiji, Nara, Japan

The founding of the Huayan school proper is traditionally attributed to a series of five patriarchs who were instrumental in developing the school's doctrines during the Tang dynasty (618 to 907). These Huayan "patriarchs" (though they did not call themselves as such) were erudite scholar-practitioners who created a unique tradition of exegesis, study and practice through their writings and oral teachings. They were particularly influenced by the works of the Dilun and Shelun schools of Chinese Yogacara.

These five patriarchs are:

1. Dushun (Chinese: 杜順; Wade–Giles: Tu-Shun, c. 557–640), a monk who was known as a meditator master and who was devoted to the Huayan sūtra. He wrote several works. The Discernments of the Huayan Dharmadhātu (Huayan fajie guanmen) has been attributed to him, but this is questioned by modern scholars. His base was at Xi'an and the Zhongnan mountains.
2. Zhiyan (Chinese: 智儼; Wade–Giles: Chih-yen, c. 602–668), was a student of Dushun who is considered to have established most of the main doctrines of Huayan thought and is thus a crucial figure in the foundation of Huayan. Zhiyan also studied with various masters from the Dilun and Shelun schools, which were branches of Chinese Yogacara, and synthesized their ideas. Zhiyan's key contribution was the theory of the "dependent arising from the dharma realm" (法界缘起), which he saw as the essence of Huayan Sūtra. He also taught the doctrine of the ten mysterious gates (十玄门), which are principles that explain dependent arising and the interfusion of all phenomena.
3. Fazang (Chinese: 法藏; Wade–Giles: Fa-tsang, c. 643–712), who was the disciple of Zhiyan and the Buddhist teacher of the Empress Wu Zetian (684–705). He is often considered the real founder of the school. He wrote numerous works on Huayan thought and practice including several commentaries on the Avatamsaka. He developed the doctrinal classification system of Huayan and the doctrine of the perfect interfusion of six characteristics (六相圓融). He also worked on a new translation of the Avatamsaka Sūtra (in collaboration with various figures, including Śikṣānanda) in 80 fascicles.
4. Chengguan (Chinese: 澄觀; Wade–Giles: Ch'eng-kuan, c. 738–839), though he was not a direct student of Fazang (who died 25 years before Chengguan's birth), Chengguan further developed the Huayan teachings in innovative directions in his various commentaries and treatises. He was a student of Fashen (718–778), who was a student of Fazang's student Huiyuan. Chengguan's voluminous commentary to the new 80 fascicle Avatamsaka (the Da fang-guang fo huayan jing shu, 大方廣佛華嚴經疏, T. 1735), along with his sub-commentary to it (T. 1736), soon became the authoritative commentaries to the sūtra in East Asia.
5. Guifeng Zongmi (Chinese: 圭峰宗密; Wade–Giles: Kuei-feng Tsung-mi, c. 780–841), who is also known for also being a patriarch of Chinese Chán and for also writing on Daoism and Confucianism. His writings include works on Chan (such as the influential Chan Prolegomenon) and various Huayan commentaries. He was particularly fond of the Sūtra of Perfect Enlightenment, writing a commentary and sub-commentary to it.

While the above list is the most common one, other Huayan patriarchal lists add different figures, such as Nagarjuna, Asvaghosa, Vasubandhu, and the lay master Li Tongxuan (Chinese: 李通玄, 635?–730), the author of the Xin Huayan Jing Lun (新華嚴經論, Treatise on the new translation of the Avatamsaka Sūtra), a popular and lengthy commentary on the Avatamsaka. Li Tongxuan's writings on the Huayan sūtra were particularly influential on later Chan Buddhists, who often preferred his interpretations.

Another important Huayan figure of the Tang era was Fazang's main disciple Huiyuan (慧苑, 673–743) who also wrote a commentary on the Avatamsaka Sūtra. Because Huiyuan modified some of Fazang's interpretations, he was retroactively sidelined from the Huayan lineage of patriarchs by later figures like Chengguan who criticized some of his doctrinal positions. According to Imre Hamar, Huiyuan compared the Daoist teachings on the origination of the world to the Huayan teaching on the dependent arising of the tathagatagarbha. Huiyuan also incorporated Daoism and Confucianism into his panjiao (doctrinal classification) system. Chengguan disagreed with this.

=== Liao and Xia developments ===
After the time of Zongmi and Li Tongxuan, Chinese Huayan generally stagnated in terms of new developments, and then eventually began to decline. The school, which had been dependent upon the support it received from the government, suffered severely during the Great Buddhist Persecution of the Huichang era (841–845), initiated by Emperor Wuzong of Tang. The Huichang persecution caused significant destruction of temples and scriptures, disrupting the formal transmission lineage of the Huayan School. After this, the history of the school became more about the transmission of Huayan doctrine within the broader Buddhist landscape rather than a strict lineage. The middle and late Tang also saw the unity of Chan and doctrines, including Huayan. During this time Huayan philosophy was absorbed into Chan, with some figures considered patriarchs of both schools. Xiqian's (700–790) Can Tong Qi (参同契) is an example of Chan absorbing Huayan theory.

The school stagnated even further in the conflicts and confusion of the late Tang dynasty and the Five Dynasties and Ten Kingdoms (907–979) era. After the fall of the Tang dynasty several Huayan commentaries were lost. However, during the Five Dynasties and Ten Kingdoms era, Huayan remained influential, being part of the "Huayan-Chan" lineages influenced by Zongmi which were very popular in the north, especially in the Khitan Liao Empire (916–1125) and the Tangut kingdom (1038–1227) of the Western Xia. Various masters from these non-Chinese kingdoms are known, such as Xianyan (1048–1118) from Kailong temple in Khitan Upper capital, Hengce (1049–1098), Tongli dashi from Yanjing, Daoshen (1056?–1114?), Xianmi Yuantong, from Liao Wutaishan, Zhifu (fl. during the reign of Liao Daozong, 1055–1101).

The Liao and Xia Huayan traditions were more syncretic, adopting elements of Zongmi's Heze Chan influenced Huayan, as well as Chinese Esoteric Buddhism (zhenyan), Hongzhou Chan, and even Tibetan Buddhism in some cases. Several texts from the Liao Huayan tradition have survived, such as master Daochen's (道㲀) Chan influenced Account of Mirroring Mind (Jingxin lu, 鏡心錄) and his esoteric influenced Collection of Essentials for Realization of Buddhahood in the Perfect Penetration of the Exoteric and Secret Teachings (Xianmi Yuantong chengfo xinyao, 顯密圓通成佛心要 T no. 1955). Another important Huayan esoteric source of this period is Jueyuan's sub-commentary on Yixing's commentary to the Mahāvairocana sūtra.

According to Daochen, the best approach to Buddhahood is the "combined practice of the exoteric and esoteric" (xianmi shuangxiu, 顯密雙修) which is for those of the highest capacity. However, he also recommended that those of "middling and lesser faculties...can choose to practice a single method according to their preference, be it the exoteric or esoteric." Daochen's esoteric teachings focused on the dharani of Cundi which he saw as "the mother of all Buddhas and the life of all bodhisattvas" and also drew on the Mani mantra. The combined use of both of these is found in the Kāraṇḍavyūha sūtra.

Another Liao Tangut work which survives from this period is The Meaning of the Luminous One-Mind of the Ultimate One Vehicle (Jiujing yicheng yuan-ming xinyao 究竟一乘圓明心要) by Tongli Hengce (通理恆策, 1048–1098). The works of the Liao tradition are important because they served as one of the sources of the later Huayan revival during the Song.

=== Song revival ===
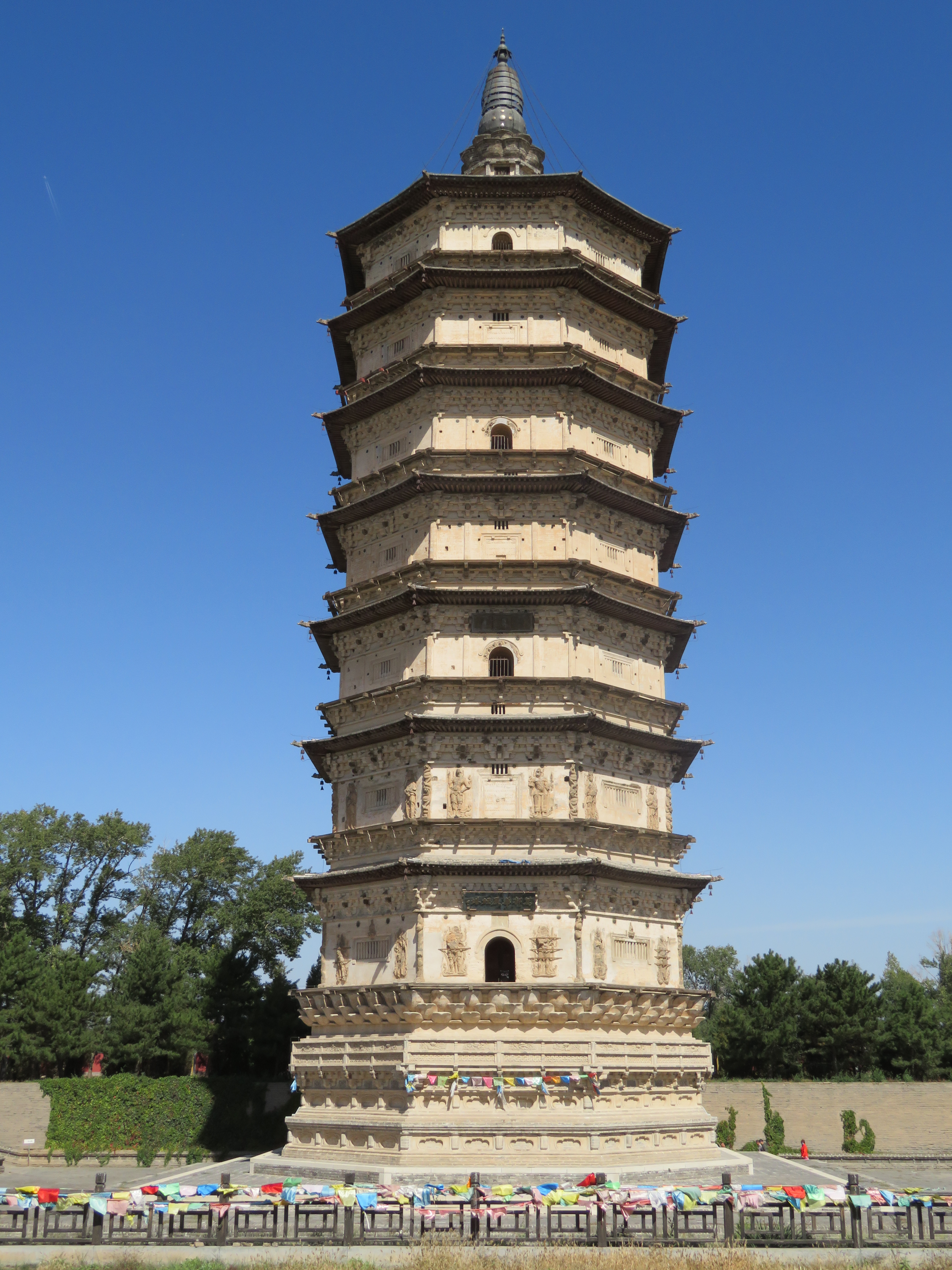
The Wanbu Huayanjing Pagoda, likely built during the Emperor Daozong of Liao (1055–1110)

After the Five Dynasties and Ten Kingdoms, the Huayan lineage experienced a revival in the following Song dynasty (960–1279) centered around Hangzhou. A prominent feature of this period of Huayan history was the integration of Huayan doctrine with other Buddhist schools, including Chan, Pure Land, and Tiantai. During the Song, Tang era Huayan commentaries which had been dispersed were returned in 1085 by the Goryeo monk Uicheon. Uicheon (義天, 1055–1101) was thus an important figure of this revival period. The chief Chinese Huayan figures of the Song dynasty revival were Changshui Zixuan (子璇, 965–1038), Jinshui Jingyuan (靜源, 1011–1088), and Yihe (義和, c. early twelfth century).

Jingyuan is known for his sub-commentary to Chengguan's Huayan sūtra commentary, while Zixuan is famed for his twenty-fascicle Notes on the Meaning of the Śūraṅgama Sūtra (首楞嚴義疏注經). While the Huayan school is generally seen as having been weaker than Chan or Tiantai during the Song, it still enjoyed considerable support from Chinese elites and from Buddhist monastics. Another important figure in the Song revival of Huayan was Guangzhi Bensong (廣智本嵩, fl. 1040), a master from the from Kaifeng. He is well known for his Thirty gāthās on the Contemplation of the Dharma-realm and Seven syllables of the title of the Huayan (Huayan qizi jing ti fajie guan sanshi men song 華嚴 七字經題法界觀三十門頌, Taisho no. 1885). Some of his other works have survived in Tangut.

New Huayan practice and ritual manuals were also written during the Song, such as Jinshui Jingyuan's "Rites on Practicing the Vows of Samantabhadra" (Chinese: 華嚴普賢行願修證儀; Pinyin: Huáyán Pǔxián Xíngyuàn Xiūzhèng Yí, Taisho Supplement no. X1473). These rites were influenced by Tiantai school ritual manuals, as well as by earlier Huayan materials. Song era Huayan monks also developed distinctly Huayan forms of "concentration and contemplation" (zhi guan), inspired by Tiantai methods as well as the Avatamsaka sūtra and Huayan thought.

Jinshui Jingyuan also helped organize some state recognized Huayan public monasteries, like Huiyin temple. Jingyuan is known for his association with Mount Wutai, which has been a key center for Huayan Buddhism since the Song dynasty.

In the Song, Huayan studies also thrived within the Chan School. Chan monks like Yongming Yanshou (904–975) drew on Huayan in their works. Yanshou quoted extensively from Huayan works in his Zong Jing Lu (宗镜录). Prominent Chan masters like Keqin (1063–1135) also incorporated Huayan doctrine into their teachings and writings.

In the later Song, there were also four great Huayan masters: Daoting, Shihui (1102–1166), Guanfu, and Xidi.

During the Yuan dynasty (1271–1368), the government encouraged the integration between Chan and doctrinal teaching. While Chan records incorporated more Huayan content, the main force transmitting Huayan theories was from doctrinal schools. Figures like Datong and Purui were active in promoting Huayan studies, often following the style of Tang masters like Chengguan.

=== Ming and Qing dynasties ===
During the Ming dynasty, Huayan remained influential. One important event during the early Ming was when the eminent Huayan monk Huijin (1355–1436) was invited by the Xuande Emperor (1399–1435) to the imperial palace to preside over the copying of ornate manuscripts of the Buddhāvataṃsaka, Prajñāpāramitā, Mahāratnakūṭa, and Mahāparinirvāṇa Sūtras.

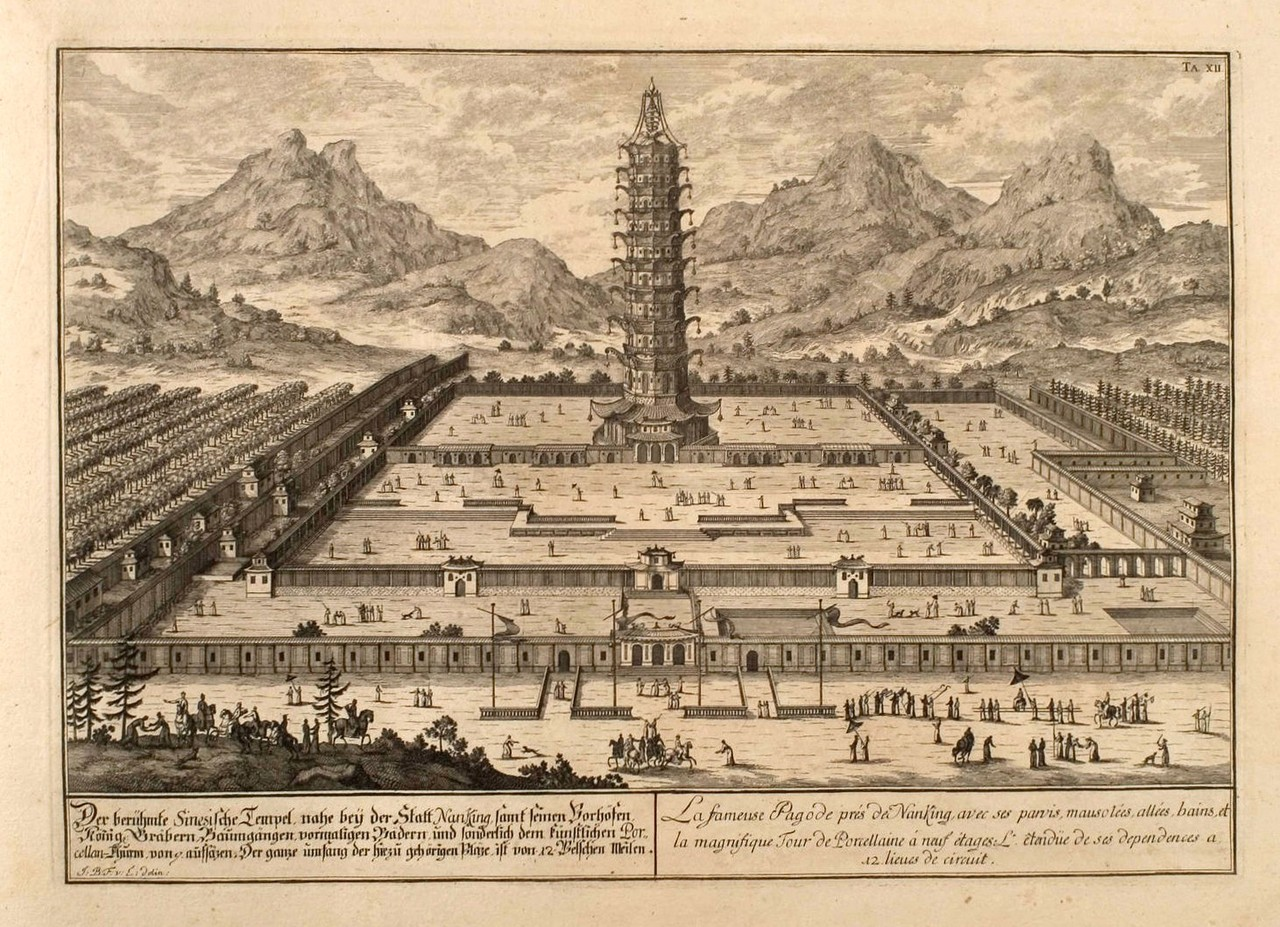
A European illustration of the Bao'en monastery and the Porcelain Tower of Nanjing, which was a center of Huayan studies during the late Ming.

During the sixteenth century, Beijing was the center of Chinese Buddhist doctrinal study. During the late Ming, Kongyin Zhencheng (1547–1617), Lu'an (or Lushan) Putai (fl. 1511) of Beijing's Da Xinglong monastery and Yu'an Zhengui (born 1558) were some of the most influential scholars of Huayan thought. Huayan philosophy was also influential on some of the most eminent monks of the Ming era, including Zibo Zhenke and Yunqi Zhuhong (1535–1615), both of whom studied and drew on Huayan thought and promoted the unity of practice (Chan and Pure Land) and study. Zhuhong himself was a student of Wuji Mingxin (1512–1574) of Bao'en monastery, who in turn was a disciple of Lu'an Putai. Another influential student of Wuji was Xuelang Hong'en (1545–1608), who became the most famous teacher in Jiangnan and lead revival of Huayan studies during this time. His main students include Yiyu Tongrun (1565–1624), Cangxue Duche (1588–1656), Tairu Minghe (1588–1640) and Gaoyuan Mingyu (fl. 1612).

During the Qing dynasty (1644–1912), Huayan philosophy continued to develop and exert a strong influence on Chinese Buddhism and its other traditions, including Chan and Pure Land. During the Qing, the most influential Huayan figures were Baiting Xufa (柏亭續法 1641–1728) and Datian Tongli (1701–1782). Xufa wrote various works on nianfo, including: Short Commentary on the Amitabhasūtra, and Straightforward Commentary on the Amitāyurdhyāna Sūtra." Another influential figure was the lay scholar Peng Shaosheng (彭紹升, 1740–1796).

Baiting Xufa and Peng Shaosheng were known for their synthesis of Huayan thought with Pure Land practice which is termed "Huayan-Nianfo." For the scholar monk Xufa, the practice of nianfo (contemplation of the Buddha) was a universal method suitable for everyone which was taught in the Avatamsaka Sūtra and could lead to an insight into the Huayan teachings of interpenetration. Xufa generally defended the mind-only Pure land view which saw the Pure land and Amitabha Buddha as reflections of the "one true mind" (yixin 一心, zhenxin 真心) or the "one true dharmadhatu." Similarly, for Peng Shaosheng, Amitabha was synonymous with the Vairocana Buddha of the Avatamsaka sūtra, and the pure land was part of Vairocana's Lotus Treasury World. As such, the practice of nianfo and of the methods of the Avatamsaka would lead to rebirth in the Pure land (which is non-dual with all worlds in the universe) and see Buddha Amitabha (which is equal to seeing all Buddhas).

=== Korean Hwaŏm ===
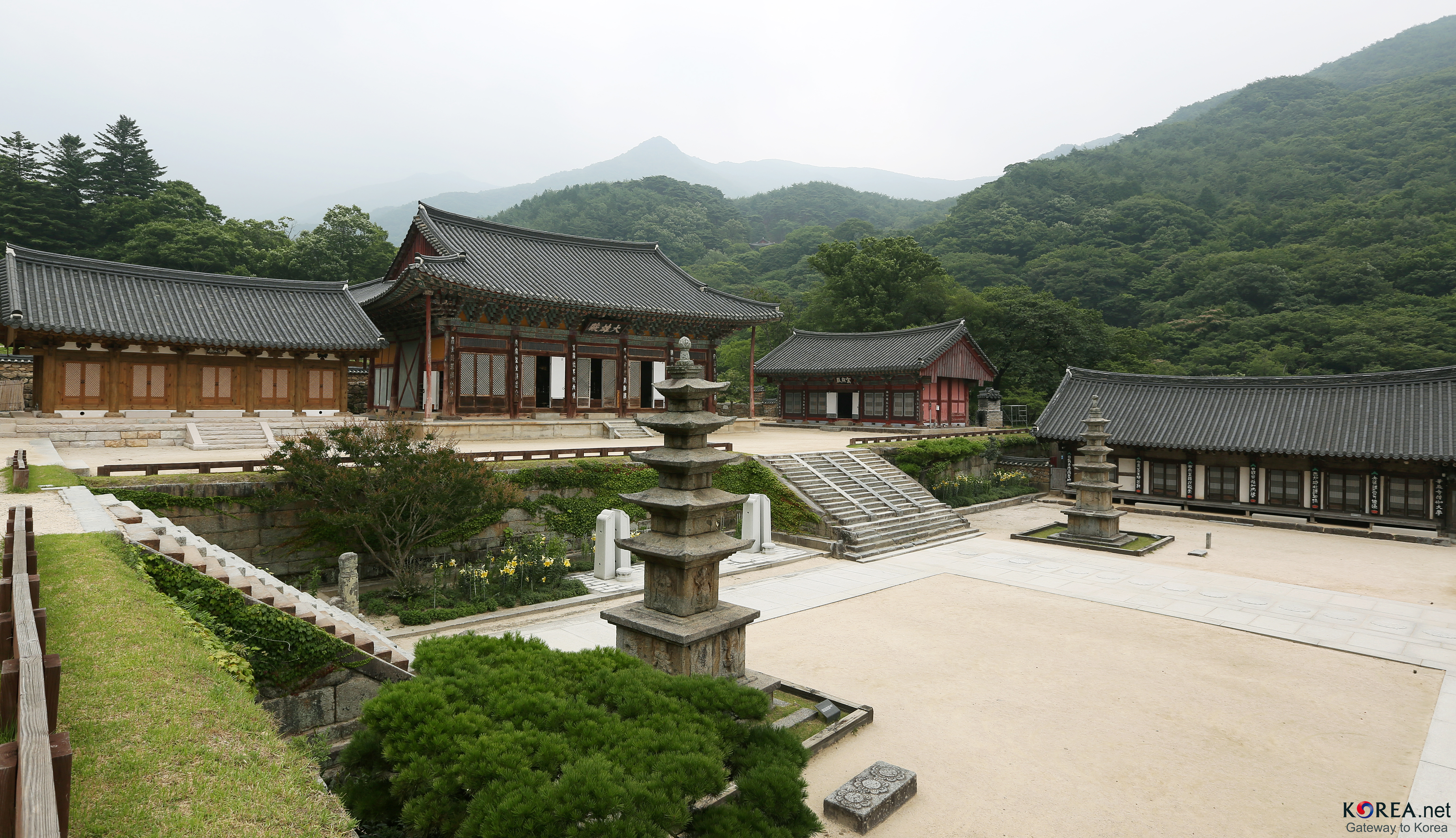
Hwaŏmsa, Jirisan National Park

In the 7th century, the Huayan school was transmitted into Silla, where it is known as Hwaŏm (화엄). This tradition was transmitted by the monk Uisang (의상대사, 625–702), who had been a student of Zhiyan together with Fazang. After Uisang returned to Korea in 671, established the school and wrote various Hwaŏm works, including a popular poem called the Beopseongge, also known as the Diagram of the Realm of Reality, which encapsulated the Huayan teaching. In this effort, he was greatly aided by the powerful influences of his friend Wonhyo, who also studied and drew on Huayan thought and is considered a key figure of Korean Hwaŏm. Wonhyo wrote a partial commentary on the Avataṃsaka Sūtra (the Hwaŏmgyŏng so). Another important Hwaŏm figure was Chajang (d. between 650 and 655).

After the passing of these two early monks, the Hwaŏm school eventually became the most influential tradition in Silla, remaining so until its demise. Royal support allowed various Hwaŏm monasteries to be constructed on all five of Korea's sacred mountains, and the tradition became the main force behind the unification of various Korean Buddhist cults, such as those of Manjushri, Maitreya and Amitābha. Important figures include the Silla monk Beomsu, who introduced the work of Chengguan to Korea in 799, and Seungjeon, a disciple of Uisang. Another important figure associated with Hwaŏm was the literatus Choe Chiweon. He is known for his biographies of Fazang and Uisang, as well as other Huayan writings. Towards the end of the Silla era, Gwanhye of Hwaŏmsa and Master Heuirang (875–927) were the two most important figures. During this period, Hwaŏmsa and Haeinsa were the centers of sub-sects that disputed with each other on matters of doctrine.

Hwaŏm remained the predominant doctrinal school in the Goryeo (918–1392). An important figure of this time was Gyunyeo (923–973). He is known for his commentary on Uisang's Diagram of the Realm of Reality. He also unified the southern and northern factions of Hwaŏmsa and Haeinsa. Korean Buddhism declined severely under the Confucian Joseon era (1392–1910). All schools were forced to merge into one single school, which was dominated by the Seon tradition. Within the Seon school, Hwaŏm thought would continue to play a strong role until modern times and various Hwaŏm commentaries were written during the Joseon era.

=== Japanese Kegon ===
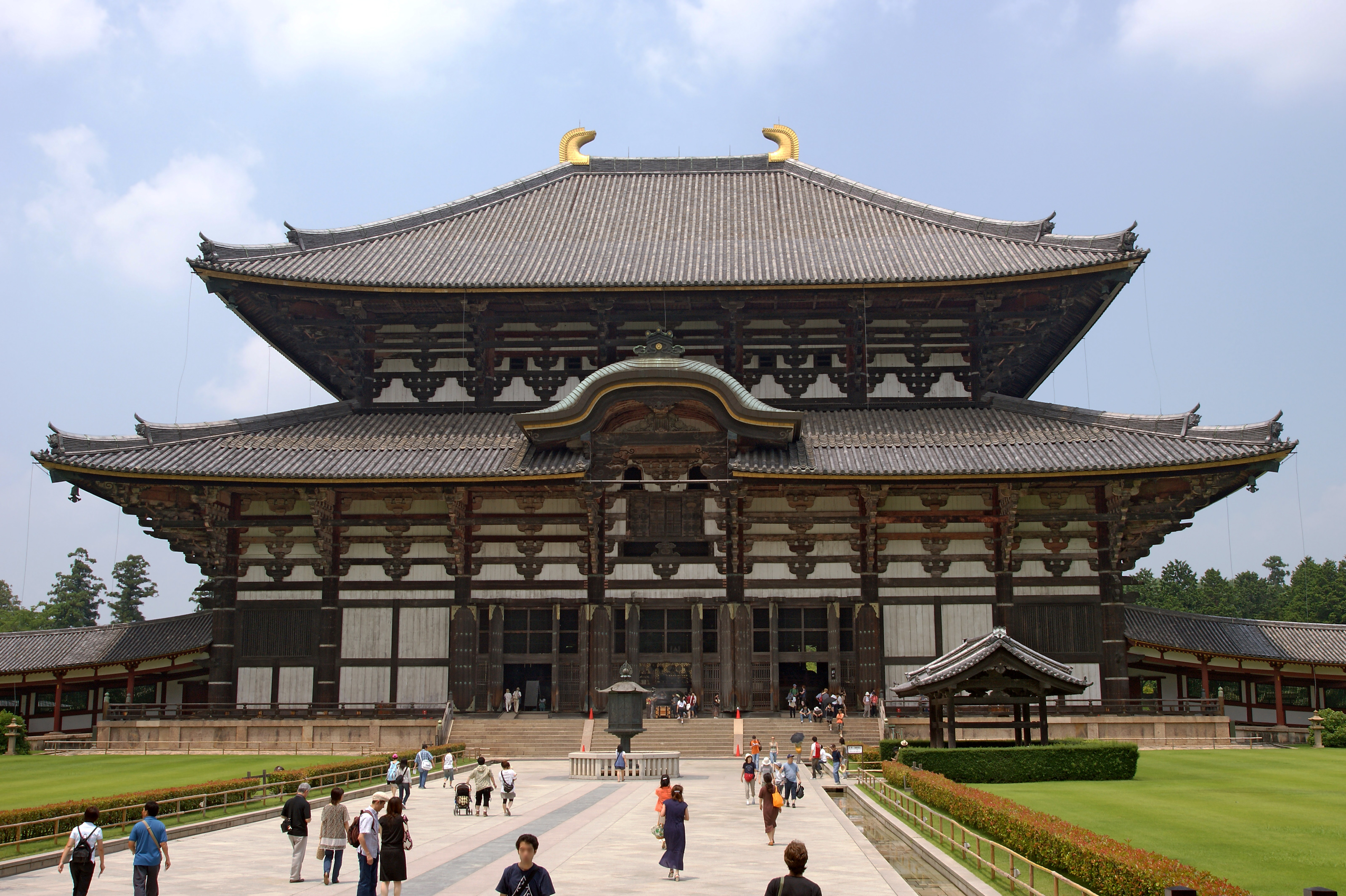
Daibutsuden at Tōdai-ji, Nara

Kegon (Japanese: 華厳宗) is the Japanese transmission of Huayan. Huayan studies were founded in Japan in 736 when the scholar-priest Rōben (689–773), originally a monk of the East Asian Yogācāra tradition, invited the Korean monk Shinjō (traditional Chinese: 審祥; ; pinyin: Shenxiang; Korean pronunciation: Simsang) to give lectures on the Avatamsaka Sūtra at Kinshōsen Temple (金鐘山寺, also 金鐘寺 Konshu-ji or Kinshō-ji), the origin of later Tōdai-ji. When the construction of the Tōdai-ji was completed, Rōben became the head of the new Kegon school in Japan and received the support of emperor Shōmu. Kegon would become known as one of the Nanto Rikushū (南都六宗) or "Six Buddhist Sects of Nanto." Rōben's disciple Jitchū continued administration of Tōdai-ji and expanded its prestige through the introduction of imported rituals.

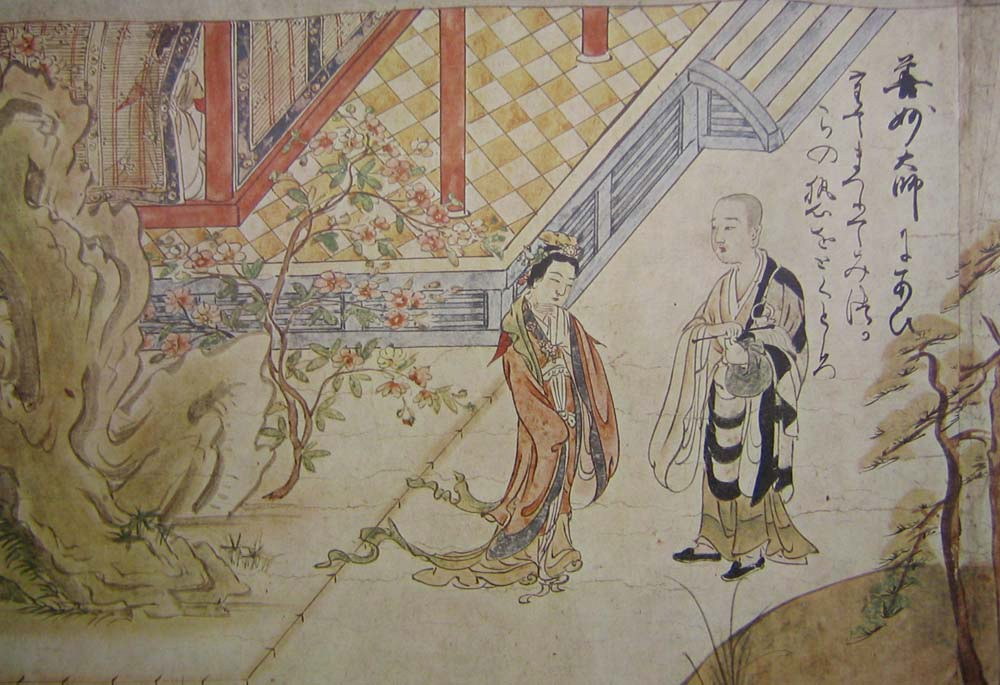
Zenmyō confesses her love to Gishō (Uisang), a painting from the Kegon Engi Emaki (Illuminated scrolls from the founders of the Kegon Sect).

Kegon thought would later be further popularized by Myōe (1173–1232), the abbot and founder of Kōzan-ji Kegon temple. Myōe combined the Kegon lineage with Tendai and Shingon esoteric lineages. He was a prolific scholar monk who composed over 50 works. Myōe promoted the practice of the mantra of light (kōmyō shingon) as simple efficacious practice that was available to all, lay and monastic. He also promoted the idea that this mantra could lead to rebirth in Amitabha's pure land, thus providing a Kegon alternative to popular Japanese Pure Land methods.

Over time, Kegon incorporated esoteric rituals from Shingon, with which it shared a cordial relationship. Its practice continues to this day, and includes a few temples overseas.

Another important Kegon figure was Gyōnen (1240–1321), who was a great scholar (who studied numerous schools including Madhyamaka, Shingon, and Risshu Vinaya) and led a revival of the Kegon school in the late Kamakura era. He was also known as a great historian of Japanese Buddhism and as a great Pure Land thinker. His Pure Land thought is most systematically expressed in his Jōdo hōmon genrushō (淨土法門源流章, T 2687:84) and it was influenced by various figures of his day, such as the Jodo monk Chōsai, and the Sanron figure Shinkū Shōnin, as well as by his understanding of Huayan thought.

In the Tokugawa period, another Kegon scholarly revival occurred under the Kegon monk Hōtan (1657–1738. a.k.a. Sōshun, Genko Dōjin) and his disciple Fujaku (1707–1781).

=== Modern Era ===
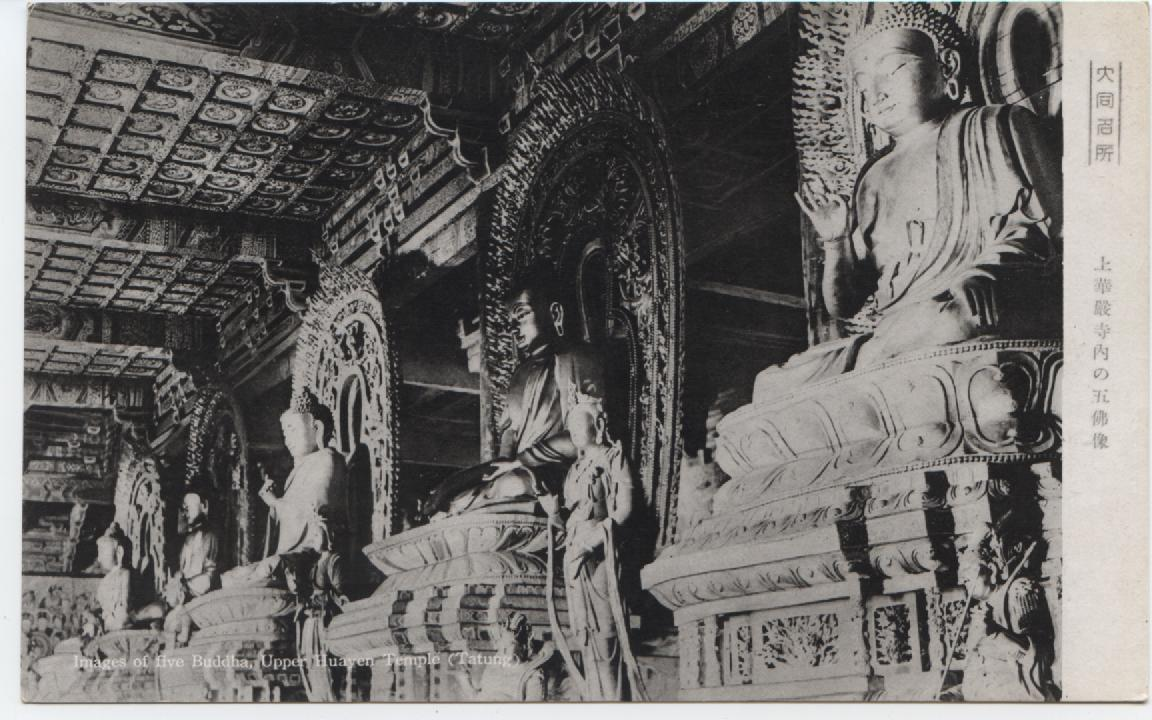
Photo of the Buddha Hall of Upper Huayan Temple (between 1937 and 1945), Datong, Shanxi, China

During the Republican Period (1912–1949), various monks were known for their focus on Huayan teaching and practice. Key Huayan figures of this era include Cizhou (1877–1958), Zhiguang (1889–1963), Changxing, Yingci, Yang Wenhui, Yuexia, Shouye, and Kefa. Some of these figures were part of a network of Huayan study and practice.

In 1914, Huayan University, the first modern Buddhist monastic school, was founded in Shanghai to further systematize Huayan teaching and teach monastics. It helped to expand the Huayan tradition into the rest of into East Asia, Taiwan, and the West. The university managed to foster a network of educated monks who focused on Huayan Buddhism during the 20th century. Through this network, the lineage of the Huayan tradition was transmitted to many monks, which helped to preserve the lineage down to the modern day via new Huayan-centred organizations that these monks would later found.

Several new Huayan Buddhist organizations have been established since the latter half of the 20th century. In contemporary times, the largest and oldest of the Huayan-centered organizations in Taiwan is the Huayan Lotus Society (Huayan Lianshe 華嚴蓮社), which was founded in 1952 by the monk Zhiguang and his disciple Nanting, who were both part of the network fostered by the Huayan University. Since its founding, the Huayan Lotus Society has been centered on the study and practice of the Huayan Sūtra. It hosts a full recitation of the sūtra twice each year, during the third and tenth months of the lunar calendar. Each year during the eleventh lunar month, the society also hosts a seven-day Huayan Buddha retreat (Huayan foqi 華嚴佛七), during which participants chant the names of the buddhas and bodhisattvas in the text. The society emphasizes the study of the Huayan Sūtra by hosting regular lectures on it. In recent decades, these lectures have occurred on a weekly basis.

Like other Taiwanese Buddhist organizations, the Society has also diversified its propagation and educational activities over the years. It produces its own periodical and runs its own press. It also now runs a variety of educational programs, including a kindergarten, a vocational college, and short-term courses in Buddhism for college and primary-school students, and offers scholarships. One example is their founding of the Huayan Buddhist College (Huayan Zhuanzong Xueyuan 華嚴專宗學院) in 1975. They have also established branch temples overseas, most notably in California's San Francisco Bay Area. In 1989, they expanded their outreach to the United States of America by formally establishing the Huayan Lotus Society of the United States (Meiguo Huayan Lianshe 美國華嚴蓮社). Like the parent organization in Taiwan, this branch holds weekly lectures on the Huayan Sūtra and several annual Huayan Dharma Assemblies where it is chanted. It also holds monthly memorial services for the society's spiritual forebears.

In Mainland China, Huayan teachings began to be more widely re-propagated after the end of the Cultural Revolution. Various monks from the network of monks fostered by the original Huayan University, such as Zhenchan (真禪) and Mengcan (夢參), were the driving factors behind the re-propagation as they travelled widely throughout China as well as other countries such as the United States and lectured on Huayan teachings. In 1996, one of Mengcan's tonsured disciples, the monk Jimeng (繼夢), also known as Haiyun (海雲), founded the Huayan Studies Association (Huayan Xuehui 華嚴學會) in Taipei, which was followed in 1999 by the founding of the larger Caotangshan Great Huayan Temple (Caotangshan Da Huayansi 草堂山大華嚴寺). This temple hosts many Huayan-related activities, including a weekly Huayan Assembly. Since 2000, the association has grown internationally, with branches in Australia, Canada, and the United States.

=== Influence ===
The doctrines of the Huayan school ended up having profound impact on the philosophical attitudes of East Asian Buddhism. According to Wei Daoru their theory of perfect interfusion was "gradually accepted by all Buddhist traditions and it eventually permeated all aspects of Chinese Buddhism." Huayan even is seen by some scholars as the main philosophy behind Chan Buddhism.

Huayan thought had a noticeable impact on East Asian Esoteric Buddhism. Kukai (774–835) was deeply knowledgeable of Huayan thought and he saw Huayan as the highest exoteric view. Some of Kukai's ideas, such as his view of Buddhahood in this body, was also influenced by Huayan ideas.

During the post-Tang era, Huayan (along with Chan) thought also influenced the Tiantai school. Tiantai school figures who were influenced by Huayan and Chan were called the "off mountain" (shanwai) faction, and a debate ensued between them and the "home mountain" (shanjia) faction.

Huayan thought was also an important source for the Pure Land doctrine of the Yuzu Nembutsu sect of Ryōnin (1072–1132). Likewise, Huayan thought was important to some Chinese Pure Land thinkers, such as the Ming exegete Yunqi Zuhong (1535–1615) and the modern lay scholar Yang Wenhui (1837–1911).

==== On Chan ====
Chinese Chan was profoundly influenced by Huayan, though Chán also defined itself by distinguishing itself from Huayan. Guifeng Zongmi, the Fifth Patriarch of the Huayan school, occupies a prominent position in the history of Chán. Mazu Daoyi, the founder of the influential Hongzhou school of Chan, was influenced by Huayan teachings, like the identity of principle and phenomena. He also sometimes quoted from Huayan sources in his sermons, like Dushun's Fajie guanmen (Contemplation of the Realm of Reality). Mazu's student Baizhang Huaihai also draws on Huayan metaphysics in his writings.

Dongshan Liangjie (806–869), the founder of the Caodong lineage, formulated his theory of the Five Ranks based on Huayan's Fourfold Dharmadhatu teaching. The influential Caodong text called Cantongqi, attributed to Shitou, also draws on Huayan themes. In a similar fashion, Linji, the founder of the Linji school, also drew on Huayan texts and commentaries, such as Li Tongxuan's Xin Huayan Jing Lun (新華嚴經論, Treatise on the new translation of the Avatamsaka Sūtra). This influence can also be seen in Linji's schema of the "four propositions." According to Thomas Cleary, similar Huayan influences can be found in the works of other Tang dynasty Chan masters like Yunmen Wenyan (d. 949) and Fayen Wenyi (885–958).

During the Song dynasty, Huayan metaphysics were further assimilated by the various Chan lineages. Cleary names Touzi Yiqing (1032–1083) and Dahui Zonggao (1089–1163) as two Song era Chan figures which drew on Huayan teachings. The Ming era Chan master Hanshan Deqing (1546–1623) is known for promoting the study of Huayan and for his work on a new edition of Chengguan's commentary on the Huayan sūtra.

A similar syncretism with Zen occurred in Korea, where the Korean Huayan tradition influenced and was eventually merged with Seon (Korean Zen). The influence of Huayan teachings can be found in the works of the seminal Seon figure Jinul. Jinul was especially influenced by the writings of Li Tongxuan.

Huayan thought has also been influential on the worldview of Thich Nhat Hanh, particularly his understanding of emptiness as "Interbeing."

== Texts ==
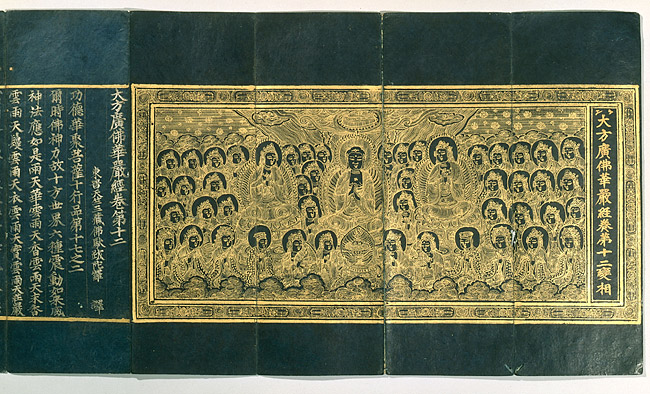
Huayan Sūtra frontispiece in gold and silver text on indigo blue paper, mid 14th century.

=== Huayan sūtra ===
The Huayan school's central text is the Avataṃsaka Sūtra (Flower Garland Sūtra, Ch. Huāyán Jīng), which is considered the supreme Buddhist revelation in this tradition. There are three different translations of the work in Chinese and other related sūtras as well. According to Paul Williams, the Avataṃsaka Sūtra is not a systematic philosophical work, though it does contain various Mahayana teachings reminiscent of Madhyamaka and Yogacara, as well as mentioning a pure untainted awareness or consciousness (amalacitta).

The sūtra is filled with mystical and visionary imagery, focusing on figures like the bodhisattvas Samantabhadra and Manjushri, and the Buddhas Shakyamuni, and Vairocana. Vairocana is the universal Buddha, whose body is the entire universe and who is said to pervade every atom in the universe with his light, wisdom, teachings, and magical emanations.

According to the Huayan sūtra:

The realm of the Buddhas is inconceivable, no sentient being can fathom it....The Buddha constantly emits great beams of light, in each light beam are innumerable Buddhas....The Buddha-body is pure and always tranquil, the radiance of its light extends throughout the world....The Buddha's freedom cannot be measured— It fills the cosmos and all space....With various techniques it teaches the living, sound like thunder, showering the rain of truth....All virtuous activities in the world come from the Buddha's light....In all atoms of all lands Buddha enters, each and every one, producing miracle displays for sentient beings: Such is the way of Vairocana....In each atom are many oceans of worlds, their locations each different all beautifully pure. Thus does infinity enter into one, yet each unit's distinct, with no overlap....In each atom are innumerable lights pervading the lands of the ten directions, all showing the Buddhas' enlightenment practices. The same in all oceans of worlds. In each atom the Buddhas of all times appear, according to inclinations; While their essential nature neither comes nor goes, by their own power they pervade the worlds.

All these awakened activities and skillful techniques (upaya) are said to lead all living beings through the bodhisattva stages and eventually to Buddhahood. These various stages of spiritual attainment are discussed in various parts of the sūtra (book 15, book 26).

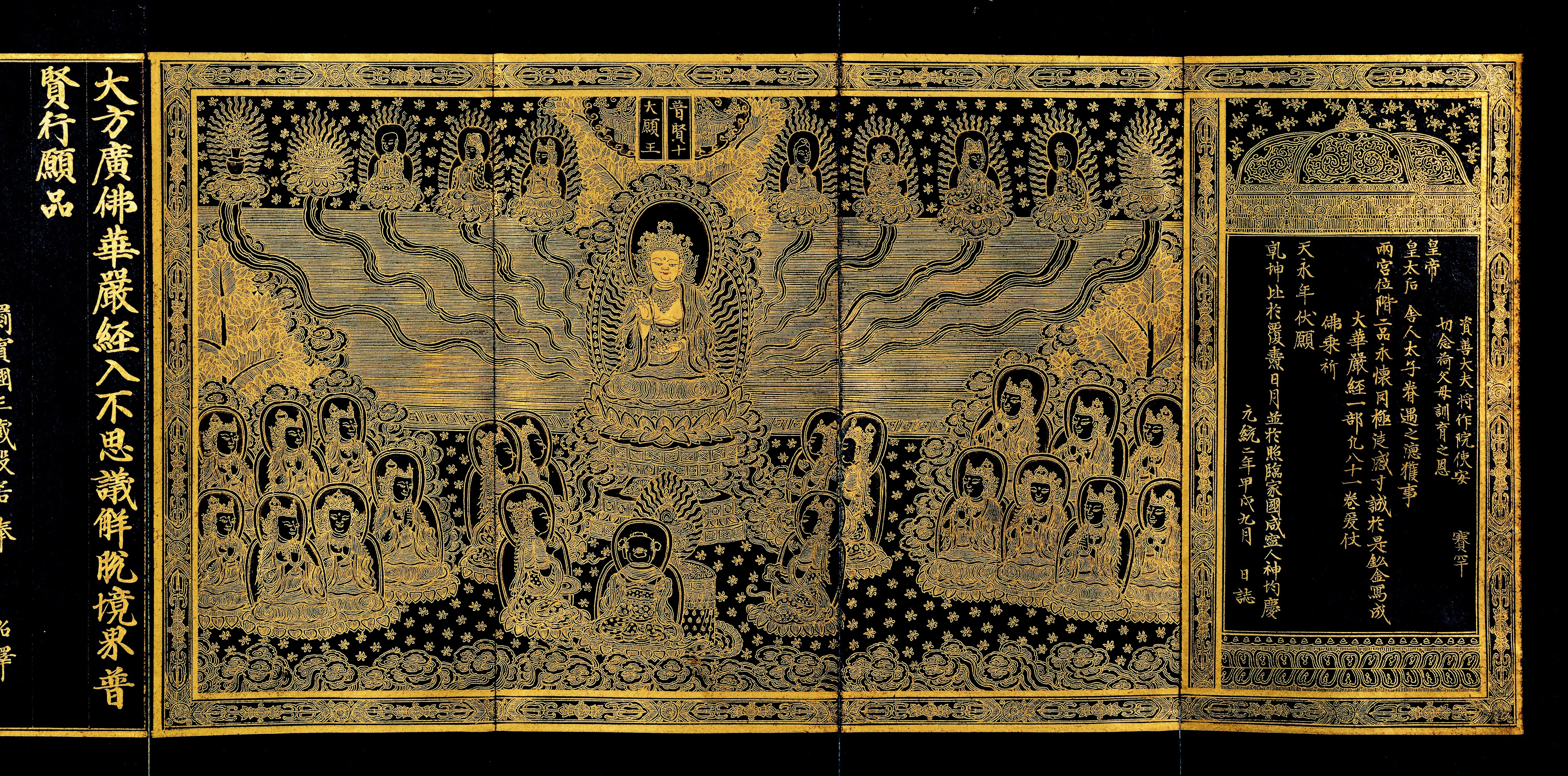
Huayan Sūtra illustration from the Goryeo Dynasty

An important doctrine that the Huayan school drew from this sūtra is the idea that all levels of reality are interrelated, interpenetrated and interfused, and so "inside everything is everything else." As the Huayan sūtra states:

They ... perceive that the fields full of assemblies, the beings and aeons which are as many as all the dust particles, are all present in every particle of dust. They perceive that the many fields and assemblies and the beings and the aeons are all reflected in each particle of dust.

According to Dumoulin, the Huayan vision of "unity in totality allows every individual entity of the phenomenal world its uniqueness without attributing an inherent nature to anything." According to Williams, this interfused vision of the cosmos is the total realm of all phenomena, the "Dharma realm" (Dharmadhatu) as seen from the point of view of a Buddha. The focus of the Huayan sūtra is thus how to attain this contemplative universal vision of ultimate reality, as well as the miraculous powers of Buddhas and bodhisattvas with which they communicate their vision of the ultimate truth.

Furthermore, because all things are interconnected and interfused, the Buddha (and his cosmic body and universal light) is present everywhere and so is his wisdom, which is said to be all pervasive. As chapter 32 of the sūtra states: "in the class of living beings there is no place where the wisdom of Tathagata is not present."

=== Other key scriptures ===
The Awakening of Faith in the Mahayana (Dasheng Qixin Lun, 大乘起信論) was another key scriptural source for Huayan masters like Fazang and Zongmi, both of whom wrote commentaries on this treatise. The Lotus Sūtra was also seen as an important scripture in Huayan. Various Huayan masters saw the Lotus sūtra as a sūtra of definitive (ultimate) meaning alongside the Avatamsaka. Fazang also considered the Lankavatara Sūtra to be a definitive sūtra, and he wrote a commentary on it. The Sūtra of Perfect Enlightenment was also particularly important for the Huayan patriarch Zongmi.

=== Commentaries and treatises ===
The Huayen patriarchs wrote numerous other commentaries and original treatises. Fazang for example, wrote commentaries on the Avatamsaka, the Lankavatara Sūtra, the Awakening of Faith, the Brahmajāla Sūtra (Taisho no. 40, no. 1813) and the Ghanavyūha Sūtra (no. X368 in the supplement to the Taisho canon, Xu zang jing 續藏經 vol. 34).

Perhaps the most important commentaries for the Chinese Huayan school are Fazang's commentary on the Avatamsaka Sūtra, the Huayan jing tanxuan ji (華嚴經探玄記, Record of Investigating the Mystery of the Avatamsaka sūtra) in 60 fascicles and Chengguan's Extensive Commentary on the Buddhāvataṃsaka sūtra (Da fang-guang fo huayan jing shu, 大方廣佛華嚴經疏, T. 1735), and his sub-commentary (T. 1736). Other Huayan figures like Zhiyan, and Li Tongxuan also wrote influential commentaries on the Huayan sūtra.

Fazang wrote a number of other original Huayan treatises, such as Treatise on the Golden Lion, which is said to have been written to explain Huayan's view of interpenetration to Empress Wu. Another key Huayen treatise is On the Meditation of the Dharmadhātu attributed to the first patriarch Dushun.

Peter N. Gregory notes that the Huayan commentarial tradition was: "not primarily concerned with a careful exegesis of the original meaning of the scripture." Instead it was concerned with specific doctrines, ideas and metaphors (such as nature origination, the dependent arising of the dharmadhatu, interfusion, and the six characteristics of all dharmas) which was inspired by scripture.

== Doctrine ==
Huayan thought seeks to explain the nature of the Dharmadhatu (法界, fajie, the realm of phenomena, the Dharma realm), which is the world as it is ultimately, from the point of view of a fully awakened being. In East Asian Buddhism, the Dharmadhatu is the whole of reality, the totality of all things. Thus, Huayan seeks to provide a holistic metaphysics that explains all of reality.

Huayan philosophy is influenced by the Huayan sūtra, other Mahayana scriptures like the Awakening of Faith and the Lotus Sūtra, as well as by the various Chinese Buddhist traditions like Chinese Yogacara, the buddha-nature schools like Shelun and Dilun, and Madhyamaka (Sanlun). Huayan patriarchs were also influenced by non-buddhist Chinese philosophy.

Some key elements of Huayan philosophy are: the interpenetration and interfusion (yuanrong) of all phenomena (dharmas), "nature origination" (xingqi) - how phenomena arise out of an ultimate principle, which is buddha-nature, or the "One Mind," how the ultimate principle (li) and all phenomena (shi) are mutually interpenetrated, the relation between parts and the whole (understood through the six characteristics), a unique Huayan interpretation of the Yogacara framework of the three natures (sanxing) and a unique view of Vairocana Buddha as an all pervasive cosmic being.

=== Interpenetration ===
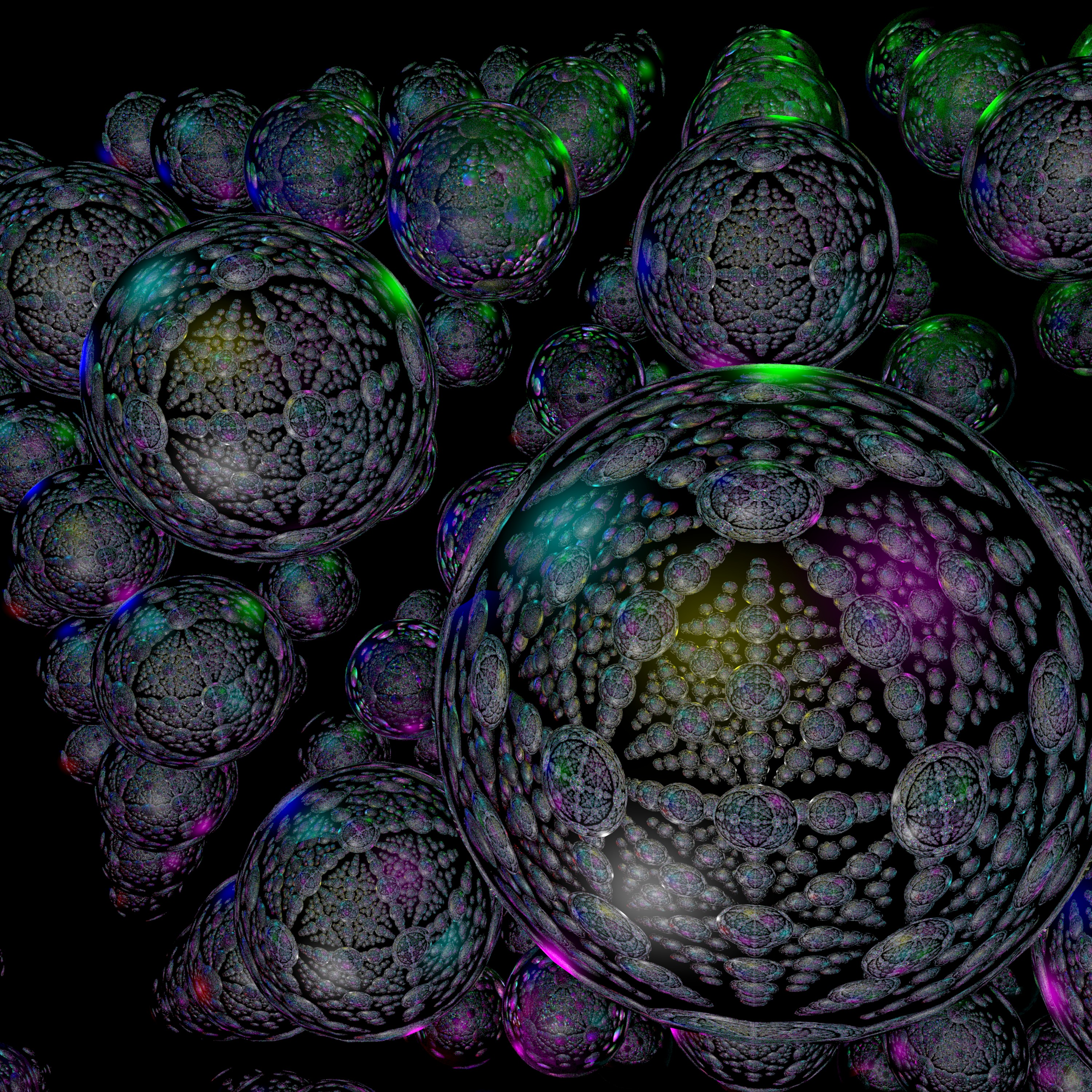
A 3D rendering of Indra's net

A key doctrine of Huayan is the mutual containment and interpenetration (xiangru) of all phenomena (dharmas), also known as "perfect interfusion" (yuanrong, 圓融). This is associated with what is termed "dharmadhatu pratityasamutpada" (法界緣起, fajie yuanqi, the dependent arising of the whole realm of phenomena), which is Huayan's unique interpretation of dependent arising. This doctrine is described by Wei Daoru as the idea that "countless dharmas (all phenomena in the world) are representations of the wisdom of Buddha without exception" and that "they exist in a state of mutual dependence, interfusion and balance without any contradiction or conflict." According to the doctrine of interpenetration, any phenomenon exists only as part of the total nexus of reality, its existence depends on the total network of all other things, which are all equally connected to each other and contained in each other.

According to Fazang, since the sum of all things determines any individual thing, "one is many, many is one" (yi ji duo, duo ji yi). Furthermore, according to Fazang "one in many, many in one" (yi zhong duo, duo zhong yi), because any dharma penetrates and is penetrated by the totality of all things. Thomas Cleary explains this Buddhist holism as one which sees the universe "as one single nexus of conditions in which everything simultaneously depends on, and is depended on by, everything else. Seen in this light, then, everything affects and is affected by, more or less immediately or remotely, everything else; just as this is true of every system of relationships, so is it true of the totality of existence." In this worldview, all dharmas are so interconnected that they are fused together without any obstructions in a perfectly harmonious whole (which is the entire universe, the Dharmadhatu).

In the Huayan school, the teaching of interpenetration is depicted through various metaphors, such as Indra's net, a teaching which may have been influenced by the Gandhavyuha chapter's climax scene in Vairocana's Tower. Indra's net is an infinite cosmic net that contains a multifaceted jewel at each vertex, with each jewel being reflected in all of the other jewels, ad infinitum. Thus, each jewel contains the entire net of jewels reflected within.

Other Huayan metaphors included a hall of mirrors, the rafter and the building, and the world text. The rafter-building metaphor can be found in Fazang's famous "Rafter Dialogue." Fazang argues that any rafter (any part) is essential to the existence of its building (standing in for the universe, the dharmadhatu). Likewise, the identity and existence of any rafter is also dependent on it being part of a building (otherwise it would not be a rafter). Therefore, any phenomenon is necessarily dependent upon all phenomena in the universe, and because of this, all phenomena lack any metaphysical independence or essential nature (svabhava).

=== Threefold Discernment of the Dharmadhatu ===
The Discernments of the Dharmadhatu attributed to Dushun, the founding patriarch of the Huayan school, is structured around three meditative insights, or "discernments," that distill the experiential and metaphysical implications of the Huayan Sūtra. Rather than offering a textual exegesis, this work aims to render the Huayan teachings accessible for contemplation and practice. The first discernment affirms the identity of form (rūpa) and emptiness (śūnyatā), a theme rooted in Indian Mahayana thought. His presentation of the idea follows classic presentations of emptiness found in Indian Prajñaparamita and Madhyamaka texts.

The second discernment, which Dushun entitles the "mutual non-obstruction of li and shi," marks a distinctive turn in Huayan metaphysics and introduces new terminology unique to East Asian Buddhism. Dushun presents ultimate reality as a patterned activity, introducing the term li (principle or pattern) to characterize the underlying structure of reality as it is perceived in Buddhahood. This reframing of the ultimate as a regular universal principle presents the ultimate as an immanent reality manifest as the patterns of all phenomena. This is significantly different than the purely apophatic truth of emptiness which communicates a lack of self-existence. Dushun also employs the term shi (phenomena, events, or things) to refer to the multiplicity of empirical reality, to all things. By doing so, he broadens the focus of contemplation from the elementary dharmas alone to all types of things, including composite entities.

The second discernment elaborates ten interrelated themes organized into five dialectical pairs: mutual pervasion, mutual manifestation, mutual concealment, identity, and distinction between li and shi. These thematic pairs collectively articulate the paradoxical claim that the universal (li) and the particular (shi) not only coexist but also interpenetrate and pervade each other fully. The analogy of waves and water (where each wave both arises from and pervades the ocean) serves to illustrate how discrete things can appear distinct while lacking fixed boundaries. This framework preserves individual differentiation while affirming a radical ontological interdependence. Thus, according to the second discernment, each particular thing, due its empty, fluid and indeterminate nature, is filled with the ultimate principle of all things, and likewise the ultimate principle contains all particular things.

The third and highest contemplative discernment, the "total pervasion and accommodation," shifts the main focus of contemplation to phenomena (shi), and the relationships among them, abandoning any mention of principle (li) altogether. This final discernment emphasizes the value of the phenomenal world and presents phenomena as self-sufficient, and groundless. Phenomena are presented here as having no ultimate base, support or source but themselves as interrelated things. Thus, in this final discernment, all things appear due to a radical interrelatedness with all other things, not due to any absolute reality that undergirds them. Furthermore, in this discernment, each phenomenon is understood to encompass and be encompassed by all other phenomena. This is because the emptiness of all phenomena entails their total fullness, since their emptiness entails that they lack any essential boundaries. As such, even the smallest particle reflects and contains all other particles in the cosmos, in a recursive and fractal-like structure of relations.

Dushun summarizes the discernments through the following short phrases: one is in one (common sense worldly view), one is in all (first discernment), all are in one (second discernment), all are in all (third discernment). Dushun's threefold discernment formed the conceptual basis for later Huayan theories of perfect interfusion and totalistic harmony. Though Dushun's articulation remains suggestive rather than fully systematic, it laid the groundwork for further philosophical elaboration by later figures such as Fazang.

=== The six characteristics ===
One framework which is used by the Huayan tradition to further explain the doctrine of interpenetration is the "perfect interfusion of the six characteristics" (liuxiang yuanrong 六相圓融). Each element of the six characteristics refers to a specific kind of metaphysical relation. The six characteristics are:

1. Wholeness / universality (zongxiang): each dharma (like a rafter) is characterized by wholeness, because it takes part in creating a whole (like a building), and each dharma is indispensable in creating the whole.
2. Particularity / distinctness (biexiang): a dharma is characterized by particularity (e.g. any specific rafter) as far as it is a numerically distinct particular that is different from the whole.
3. Identity / sameness (tongxiang): each dharma is characterized by a certain identity with all other parts of the whole, since they all mutually form the whole without conflict.
4. Difference (yixiang): each dharma is different, since they have distinct functions and appearance, even while being part of a single whole.
5. Integration (chengxiang): each dharma is integrated together with other dharmas in forming each other and in forming the whole, and each dharma does not interfere with every other dharma.
6. Non-integration / disintegration (huaixiang): the fact that each part maintains its unique activity and retains its individuality while making up the whole.

=== Ten mysterious gates ===
The second patriarch Zhiyan taught an important doctrine called the ten mysterious gates, or ten profound principles (十玄門 Shí Xuán Mén). These ten statements provide a further explication of the main implications and significance of the Huayan interfusion theory. The ten profound gates are:

1. The Gate of Simultaneous, Complete, and Harmonious Production (同時具足相應門): All phenomena arise simultaneously and interdependently in perfect harmony, forming a complete, non-dual totality. Nothing is lacking or out of place in the ultimate reality (Dharmadhātu).
2. The Gate of Free and Unhindered Interpenetration of the Vast and the Narrow (廣狹自在無礙門): The infinite (vast) and the finite (narrow) interpenetrate without obstruction. Each contains the whole, yet retains its distinct form. A single particle can encompass the entire cosmos without hindrance.
3. The Gate of Mutual Accommodation of the One and the Many, without losing their own peculiarities (多相容不同門): The one (whole) and the many (parts) coexist without conflict, each part contains the whole, yet each remains distinct. This reflects the non-duality of unity and diversity.
4. The Gate of Freedom in the Mutual Identity of All Dharmas (諸法相卽自在門): All phenomena are mutually identical, each thing is both itself and all other things, without obstruction.
5. The Gate of the Simultaneous Completion of the Hidden and the Manifest (隱密顯了倶成門): The hidden (latent) and the manifest (apparent) are fully present at the same time. Every phenomenon simultaneously reveals and conceals the totality of reality.
6. The Gate of the Establishment of Harmony through the Mutual Inclusion of Subtle Elements (微細相容安立門): Even the most minute phenomena contain and reflect all others without obstruction, like a single thought encompassing the entire universe.
7. The Gate of the Dharmadhātu of Indra's Net (因陀羅網法界門): Reality is like Indra's Net, where each jewel reflects all others infinitely. Every phenomenon is both a reflection of and a condition for all others, illustrating perfect interpenetration.
8. The Gate of Generating Understanding through Revealing Dharma by Means of Phenomena (託事顯法生解門), this means that any particular dharma can serve as a gateway to understanding ultimate truth, since all things are equally interfused and contain the entire Dharma
9. The Gate of the Formation of Differentiated Dharmas Separated by Ten Temporal Levels of Existence (十世隔法異成門): This means past, present, and future (all times) are fully interfused. Each moment contains all times.
10. The Gate of Interdependent Illumination: Where Principal and Secondary Phenomena Perfectly Manifest All Virtues (主伴圓明具德門): Any phenomenon can be taken as the "primary" focus (主), with all others as its "attendants" (伴), yet each is equally complete and virtuous. This shows the non-hierarchical, interdependent nature of reality.

=== Implications of perfect interfusion ===
The Buddhist doctrine of interpenetration also has several further implications in Huayan thought:

- Truth is understood as encompassing and interpenetrating falsehood (or illusion), and vice versa (see also: two truths)
- Purity (Śuddha) and goodness is understood as interpenetrating impurity and evil
- Practicing any single Buddhist teaching entails the practicing of all other teachings
- Ending one mental defilement (klesha) is ending all of them
- The past contains the future and vice versa, all, three times are interfused
- Practicing in one bodhisattva stage (bhumi) entails practicing in all bodhisattva stages

Furthermore, according to the lay Huayan master Li Tongxuan, all things are just the one true dharma-realm (Ch. yi zhen fajie), and as such, there is no ontological difference between sacred and secular, awakening and ignorance, or even between Buddhahood and living beings. Because of the unity of ordinary human life and enlightenment, Li also held that Chinese sages like Confucius and Laozi also taught the bodhisattva path in their own way.

The Huayan doctrines of interfusion and non-duality also lead to several seemingly paradoxical views. Some examples include: (1) since any phenomenon X is empty, this implies X is also not X; (2) any particular phenomenon is an expression of and contains the absolute and yet it retains its particularity; (3) since each phenomenon contains all other phenomena, the conventional order of space and time is violated.

=== Time and causality ===
A radical implication of the Huayan view is their view of philosophy of time. As per Fazang, time is not as an independent entity but is entirely constituted by the interdependent relationships among all phenomena (dharmas). For Fazang, dharmas and their relations are time; they do not exist "in" time. Each dharma's temporal designation as past, present, or future is relative and contingent on its relationship to other dharmas, expressed through the binary relation "earlier than–later than." In his Sanbao zhang, Fazang subdivides each of the three main tenses into three subcategories (e.g., past-past, past-present, past-future, etc.), emphasizing that temporal designations are mutually interdependent and context-dependent, with no absolute temporal identity. Tense arises only within specific relational pairings of dharmas and can change when the relational context changes, though within any given two-place relation, temporal roles remain fixed. Thus, Fazang affirms that a single dharma may be simultaneously past, present, and future when viewed from different relational standpoints.

Fazang's theory of causation also reduces causality to a relative and relational phenomenon, rather than a fixed law. Thus, Fazang affirms that causation flows not only from past to future but also from future to past, allowing the present to be both the recipient and generator of karmic influence. This acceptance of retrocausality is understood in a framework in which the "present" has active power (youli) while the past and future are "without power" (wuli), yet still influenced by the present. Although causality is asymmetrical within each causal relationship, Fazang maintains that no single causal relationship or temporal perspective is ontologically privileged. Instead, all relational connections are equally valid, and their truth becomes fully evident only from the standpoint of enlightened wisdom, which transcends conventional notions of "before" and "after," or "cause" and "effect." Thus, while Fazang's model includes temporal symmetry across relations and asymmetry within them, he does not claim that either is ontologically superior. A major implication of this view of causality is that one's future mindstream as a Buddha in the future can aid in the liberation of oneself in the present. As Fazang writes in the following question-and-answer exchange:

Question: At present my body constitutes a future Buddha. Does that (future) Buddha save my present body by causing it to cultivate practice or not?

Answer: It does save you by causing you to cultivate practice.

Question: But that Buddha is what I attain by cultivating practice. How then can it save me now by causing me to practice?

Answer: If that Buddha does not save you, the body now does not become a Buddha. So, when that Buddha saves me, then I can practice to become that same Buddha.

Question: How can this be?

Answer: If we follow with the logic of dependent origination, if there is not that (future) Buddha, then there is no me now. And if there is no me now, then there is not that Buddha. So, we know it is thus. (And just as the future exists in dependent) opposition to the present, it is also thus to the limits of the past.

=== Ultimate principle ===
An important metaphysical framework used by Huayan patriarchs is that of principle (li 理, or the ultimate pattern) and phenomena (shi 事). 'Principle' is the ultimate reality (paramārtha-satya) which is endless and without limits, while phenomena (shi) refers to the impermanent and relative dharmas.

In Fazang's influential Essay on the Golden Lion (Taishō no. 1881), Fazang uses the statue of a golden Chinese lion as a metaphor for reality. The gold itself stands in for the ultimate principle, while the appearance and relative shape of the lion statue is the relative and dependent phenomena as they are perceived by living beings. Because the ultimate principle is boundless, empty and ceaseless, it is like gold in that it can be transformed into many forms and shapes. Also, even though phenomena appear as particular things, they lack any independent existence, since they all depend on the ultimate principle.

Furthermore, Huayan sees the ultimate principle and the relative phenomena as interdependent, unified and interfused, that is to say, they are non-dual. Referring to the analogy of the golden lion, Paul Williams states:

Both gold and lion exist simultaneously; both, Fazang says, are perfect and complete. There are two ways of interpreting this obscure point. First, noumenon and phenomena mutually interpenetrate and are (in a sense) identical. There is no opposition between the two. The one does not cancel out the other. Second, Fazang explains elsewhere that since all things arise interdependently (following Madhyamika), and since the links of interdependence expand throughout the entire universe and at all time (past, present, and future depend upon each other, which is to say the total dharmadhatu arises simultaneously), so in the totality of interdependence, the dharmadhatu, all phenomena are mutually interpenetrating and identical.

The ultimate principle is associated with various Mahayana terms referring to ultimate reality, such as the "One Mind" of the Awakening of Faith, Suchness, the tathagatagarbha (the womb of tathagatas), buddha-nature, or just "nature." This nature is the ontological source and ground of all phenomena.

=== Nature origination ===
Nature origination (xingqi) is a key idea in Huayan thought. The term derives from chapter 32 of the Avataṃsaka Sūtra, titled "Nature Origination of the Jewel King Tathāgata" (Baowang rulai xingqi pin, Skt. Tathāgata-utpatti-sambhava-nirdesa-sūtra). Nature origination refers to the manifestation of the ultimate nature in the phenomenal world and its interfusion with it. That is to say, the ultimate, pure nature, is interdependent on and interpenetrates the entire phenomenal universe, while also being its source. For Huayan patriarchs like Fazang, the ultimate nature is thus seen as non-dual with all relative phenomena. Because the ultimate source of all things is also interdependent and interconnected with them, it remains a ground which is empty of self-existence (svabhava) and thus it is not an independent essence, like some views of a monotheistic God.

In the preface to his Hsing yüan p'in shu, Chengguan wrote, "How great the true dhatu (ta-tsai chen-chieh)! The myriad dharmas owe their inception to it (wan-fa tzu-shih)." Zongmi elaborates on this, laying out his explanation of nature origination. For Zongmi, the "true dhatu" refers to the essential nature of the mind of the one dharmadhātu (yi fajie xin), while the myriad dharmas refer to its phenomenal appearances. "The one true dharmadhātu" is thus the pure mind that is the source of both buddhas and sentient beings. As Zongmi says, "There is not a single dharma that is not a manifestation of the original mind. Nor is there a single dharma that does not conditionally arise from the true dhatu."

Zongmi explains that this one dharmadhātu gives rise to all phenomena through two orders of causation: [1] nature origination (xingqi), and [2] conditioned origination (yuanqi). Regarding the former, where "nature" (xing) refers to the source qua the pure mind, "origination" (qi) refers to its manifestation as phenomenal appearances. This also refers to "the arising of functioning (yung) based on the essence (t'i)." For Zongmi, this means that "the entire essence of the dharmadhatu as the nature arises (ch'i) to form all dharmas." Conditioned origination, on the other hand, refers to the manner in which phenomena arise contingent upon other phenomena. As each phenomenon is linked to every other phenomenon, all phenomena are infinitely contingent. But while every phenomenon is connected to every other phenomenon, nature origination means that each of these phenomena is simultaneously based on the nature (xing), which is the ultimate source. In this way, conditioned origination is made possible by nature origination.

=== Shifting emphasis from phenomena to principle ===
Huayan teachings underwent a shift in emphasis in the Tang from the doctrine of shih-shih wu-ai to li-shih wu-ai, or from the unobstructed interpenetration of phenomenon and phenomenon to the unobstructed interpenetration of principle and phenomena. Although Fazang had taught that all phenomena were manifestations of an intrinsically pure mind, thus articulating his metaphysics within the ontological framework of li-shih wu-ai, he nonetheless held that shih-shih wu-ai, the unobstructed interpenetration of phenomenon and phenomenon, was the ultimate teaching. For Fazang, li-shih wu-ai is transcended in shih-shih wu-ai. (Note: Peter Gregory points out, however, that Liu Ming-Wood's analysis of Fazang's metaphysics has shown that the advanced teaching, which corresponds to li-shih wu-ai, "plays a far greater role in Fa-tsang's thought than his classification of it as merely the third teaching within his fivefold scheme would suggest." This creates a tension in Fazang's system. For although he speaks as though the advanced teaching is transcended in the perfect teaching, corresponding to shih-shih wu-ai, he cannot do so without undermining the perfect teaching's ontological base. In other words, while the perfect teaching is regarded as the highest in Fazang's doctrinal scheme, it cannot be established independently of the advanced teaching. Gregory also points out that Fazang's commentary on the Awakening of Faith does not discuss shih-shih wu-ai at all, and instead focuses on the conditioned arising of the tathāgatagarbha.) This position of seeing the interfusion of phenomena as being the highest perspective is also found in the works of the earlier Huayan patriarchs, Dushun and Zhiyan.

On the other hand, while Chengguan upheld Fazang's position that shih-shih wu-ai represents the highest teaching of the Buddha, he emphasized li-shih wu-ai, the unobstructed interpenetration of principle and phenomena, as that which made shih-shih wu-ai possible. That is, it is only because all phenomena (shih) are formed from principle, or the absolute (li), that phenomena do not obstruct one another. Zongmi went even further than his teacher Chengguan in emphasizing li-shih wu-ai over shih-shih wu-ai, excluding the perfect teaching (referring to shih-shih wu-ai) from his panjiao scheme, or classification of Buddhist doctrines, altogether.

As an example of this shift in emphasis, where Chengguan understands the ten profundities, or ten mysteries (shi xuan), to be the paradigmatic expression of shih-shih wu-ai and subjects them to an extensive analysis, Zongmi gives them little attention, mentioning them only in passing without bothering to list or discuss them any further. Moreover, where Chengguan had made use of the vocabulary of shih and li to elaborate his theory of the fourfold dharmadhātu (that of: [1] phenomena, shih; [2] principle, li; [3] the non-obstruction of principle and phenomena, li-shih wu-ai; and [4] the non-obstruction of phenomenon and phenomenon, shih-shih wu-ai), Zongmi eschews the language of li and shih altogether. Zongmi instead refers to a passage in which Chengguan emphasized the "one true dharmadhātu" (i-chen fa-chieh) as the essential reality and source of the four. This one true dharmadhātu is the One Mind embacing manifold existence. Zongmi identifies this with the tathāgatagarbha, the highest teaching in his doctrinal classification system.

For Zongmi, the principal teaching of the Avataṃsaka Sūtra is the tathāgatagarbha, or buddha-nature, and not the unobstructed interpenetration of phenomena. However, he says the principal teaching which "reveals the nature" makes up only one part of the Avataṃsaka. Zongmi accordingly displaces the Avataṃsaka in favor of the Awakening of Faith (which emphasizes the One Mind). For Zongmi, the unobstructed interpenetration of all phenomena is seen as less important than the one true dharmadhātu upon which those phenomena are based. In emphasizing li-shih wu-ai over shih-shih wu-ai, as well as nature origination over conditioned origination, Zongmi was also concerned to provide an ontological basis for Chan practice, thus reflecting the wider context of Zongmi's thought. (Note: As an example of Chan's de-emphasizing the interpenetration of phenomena in favor of awakening to mind, see the following from the Korean Sŏn master Jinul: "I had always had doubts about the approach to entering into awakening in the Hwaŏm teachings: what, finally, did it involve? Accordingly, I decided to question a [Hwaŏm] lecturer. He replied, 'You must contemplate the unimpeded interpenetration of all phenomena.' He entreated me further: 'If you merely contemplate your own mind and do not contemplate the unimpeded interfusion of all phenomena, you will never gain the perfect qualities of the fruition of Buddhahood.' I did not answer, but thought silently to myself, 'If you use the mind to contemplate phenomena, those phenomena will become impediments and you will have needlessly disturbed your own mind; when will there ever be an end to this situation? But if the mind is brightened and your wisdom purified, then one hair and all the universe will be interfused for there is, perforce, nothing which is outside [the mind].'")

=== The Cosmic Buddha Vairocana ===
In the cosmology of the Avatamsaka sūtra, our world is just one of the immeasurable number of worlds in a multiverse called "Ocean of worlds, whose surface and inside are decorated with an arrangement of flowers" (Kusumatalagarbha-vyuhalamkara-lokadhatu-samudra). The Avatamsaka states that this entire cosmos has been purified by the Buddha Vairocana through his bodhisattva practices for countless aeons, after having met countless Buddhas. The sūtra also states that our world is in Vairocana's buddhafield. Vairocana is closely associated with Shakyamuni Buddha, in some cases he is even identified with him in the Avatamsaka Sūtra. Huayan generally sees Shakyamuni as an emanation body (nirmanakaya) from the ultimate Buddha Vairocana ("The Illuminator").

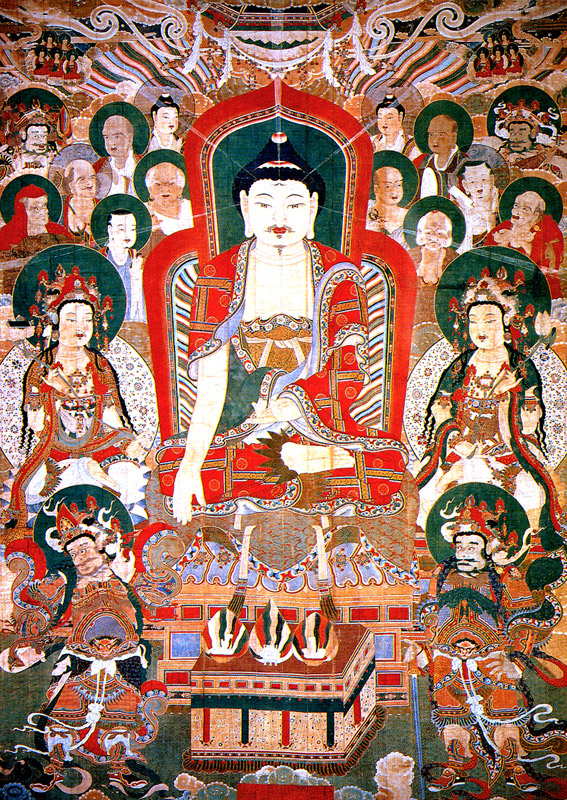
A painting of Vairocana at Hwaŏmsa

Furthermore, Huayan thought sees the entire universe as being the very body of Vairocana, who is seen as a supreme cosmic Buddha. Vairocana is infinite, his influence and light is limitless, pervading the entire universe. Furthermore, Vairocana is really the ultimate principle (li), the Dharmakaya, Suchness and "the substance underlying phenomenal reality." However, while Vairocana as ultimate principle is eternal, it also transforms and changes according to the needs and conditions of sentient beings. Furthermore, Vairocana is empty, interdependent and interfused with all phenomena in the universe. Thus, Vairocana is both immanent (due to its dependent and interfused character) and transcendent (as the immutable basis of all things).

According to Fazang, while the nirmanakaya Shakyamuni taught the other Mahayana sūtras, Vairocana teaches the Avatamsaka Sūtra through his ten bodies which are: the All-Beings Body, the Lands Body, the Karma Body, the Śrāvakas Body, the Pratyekabuddha Body, the Bodhisattvas Body, the Tathāgatas Body, the Wisdom Body, the Dharma Body, and the Space Body. Fazang sees these ten bodies as encompassing all phenomena (animate and inanimate) in the "three realms," i.e. the entire universe.

=== Understanding of the trisvabhāva ===
Huayan has a unique interpretation of the three natures (trisvabhāva) of classical Yogācāra. According to Fazang, the three natures are ultimately identical, as each of the three natures has dual aspects of emptiness and truth on the one hand, and existence and falsity on the other. For the perfected nature (pariniṣpanna), its true/empty aspect is that it is immutable, while its false/existing aspect is that it obeys conditions. The dependent nature (paratantra) has essencelessness for its true/empty aspect, while it has seeming reality for its false/existing aspect. Finally, the true/empty aspect of the imagined nature (parikalpita) is its nonexistence in reality, while its false/existing aspect is that it exists to the senses. Regarding their true/empty aspects, Fazang regards the immutability of the perfected, the essencelessness of the dependent, and the nonexistence of the imagined to be identical. He also regards their false/existing aspects to all be identical as well, namely the conditionedness of the perfected, the seeming reality of the dependent, and the existing to the senses of the imagined. For Fazang, the aspects in the true/empty category are "root," while the aspects in the false/existing category are "limbs." The limbs develop from the root. Thus, where the limbs are derivative, the root is their source.

Fazang also differs from standard Yogācāra "pivot" models of the three natures, in which the imagined and the perfected pivot on the dependent. That is, in the Yogācāra pivot model, the imagined and perfected are merely different ways of apprehending the dependent. For Fazang, on the other hand, the dependent and the imagined natures pivot on the perfected (which is equated with the One Mind), as its unconditioned and conditioned aspects.

=== Differences with classical Yogācāra ===
The cosmogonic role of self-cognition

Fazang identified the notion of "karmic appearance" (yexiang) in the Awakening of Faith with self-cognition, a concept which can be found in Yogācāra. Self-cognition is the mind's awareness of being aware. However, unlike a certain Yogācāra view, such as that of Dignāga, which regards self-cognition as an effect of consciousness' subjective aspect perceiving its objective aspect, Huayan follows the Awakening of Faith and treats self-cognition/karmic appearance as the cause of both the subjective aspect of consciousness as well as the illusory objective world. Where the effect model is concerned with epistemology, the cause model is cosmogony-oriented. That is, according to the latter position, self-cognition/karmic appearance, referring to a state in which the mind is aware only of itself, is the cause of the delusive world of samsāra with all its suffering. As Zhihua Yao explains, "It is not contributed by an external agency because the arising or awareness is inherent to the mind or reality itself." However, although this arising is based on reality itself, Fazang says it is karmic since [1] it is an action and [2] it is the cause of suffering. Of this karmic activity, Fazang states that, "Although this is (a form of) active conceptualization, it is exceedingly subtle and in a dependently originated single characteristic, that which can (cause) and that which is (caused) are not divided."

The active role of suchness

Fazang explains the karmic consciousness in terms of the essence of mind having become activated by the perfuming of ignorance. According to Fazang, based on delusion, a semblance of suchness arises which stirs the Mind-as-Suchness to produce the karmic consciousness. At the same time, he also clarifies the view that based on the storehouse consciousness, there exists ignorance. For Fazang, there are two aspects which are simultaneous: [1] based on a semblance of suchness (i.e. the "enlightenment" aspect of the storehouse consciousness) there arises delusion, and [2] based on delusion there arises a semblance of suchness (as ignorance perfumes the pure mind, forming the storehouse consciousness). Additionally, Fazang explains that, as the tathāgatagarbha does not preserve a self-nature, the absolute transforms into the various consciousnesses and their objects. He says:

The proposition of consciousness-only with respect to the establishment of phenomena through the transformation of the Absolute means that the tathāgatagarbha does not preserve its self-nature, but in accordance with conditions it manifests the eight consciousnesses, the mind, the mind associates, the objects of perception, and various appearances.

In this way, Fazang held that suchness plays an active role in creating the realm of perception and the world of phenomena. This is unlike the Yogācāra view of Xuanzang, for whom suchness is inactive, playing only a passive role in the evolution of the phenomenal world. According to the faxiang ("dharma characteristics") view associated with Xuanzang's Yogācāra, the relationship of phenomena to suchness is that of "house and ground" in which the house (phenomena) is supported by the ground (suchness), but the two are nonetheless distinct. On the other hand, according to the faxing ("dharma nature") view of Huayan, the relationship between suchness and phenomena is one of "water and wave" in which the wind of ignorance stirs the water (suchness) to produce waves (phenomena).

The singular nature of the shared sensory world

Other differences between Huayan and classical Yogācāra were highlighted during Ming dynasty debates over the nature of the bhājanaloka, or container world (i.e. the shared world of sensory experience). According to the classical Yogācāra view of intersubjectivity, each being, experiencing its own mental representations, necessarily occupies its own sensory world. Although these sensory worlds overlap when a suitable karmic connection is shared between them, according to this view there are strictly speaking as many sensory worlds as there are beings. As Ernest Billings Brewster explains, "every sentient being possesses a 'storehouse consciousness' that contains a sensory world unique to each being." Huayan exegetes such as Kongyin Zhencheng (1547–1617) in the Ming dynasty rejected this. Drawing on Huayan notions, such as that of an all-encompassing holistic dharmadhātu, Zhencheng argued that there is just a single sensory world which is shared by all beings. (Note: Compare with the notion of ekadhātu (the single realm) in the Anūnatvāpurnatvanirdeśa.)

Objective idealism versus subjective idealism

According to Fung Yu-lan, where Xuanzang's classical Yogācāra is a system of subjective idealism, Huayan is one of objective idealism. Regarding the Huayan position, Fung says, "the central element in Fa-tsang's philosophy is a permanently immutable 'mind' which is universal or absolute in its scope, and is the basis for all phenomenal manifestations. That is to say, his philosophy is a system of objective idealism. As such, it approaches realism more closely than does an idealism which is purely subjective. This is because, in a system of objective idealism, it is possible for the objective world to survive even when separated from a subject." Regarding the Yogācāra and Huayan schools, Wing-Tsit Chan says, "in both schools, the external world, called external sphere by Hsüan-tsang and the Realm of Facts by Fa-tsang, is considered manifestations of the mind. In both schools, these manifestations have universal and objective validity, although the degree of validity is higher in Hua-yen. The interesting thing is that Hua-yen presupposes a preestablished harmony while the Consciousness-Only School does not."

=== Classification of Buddhist teachings ===
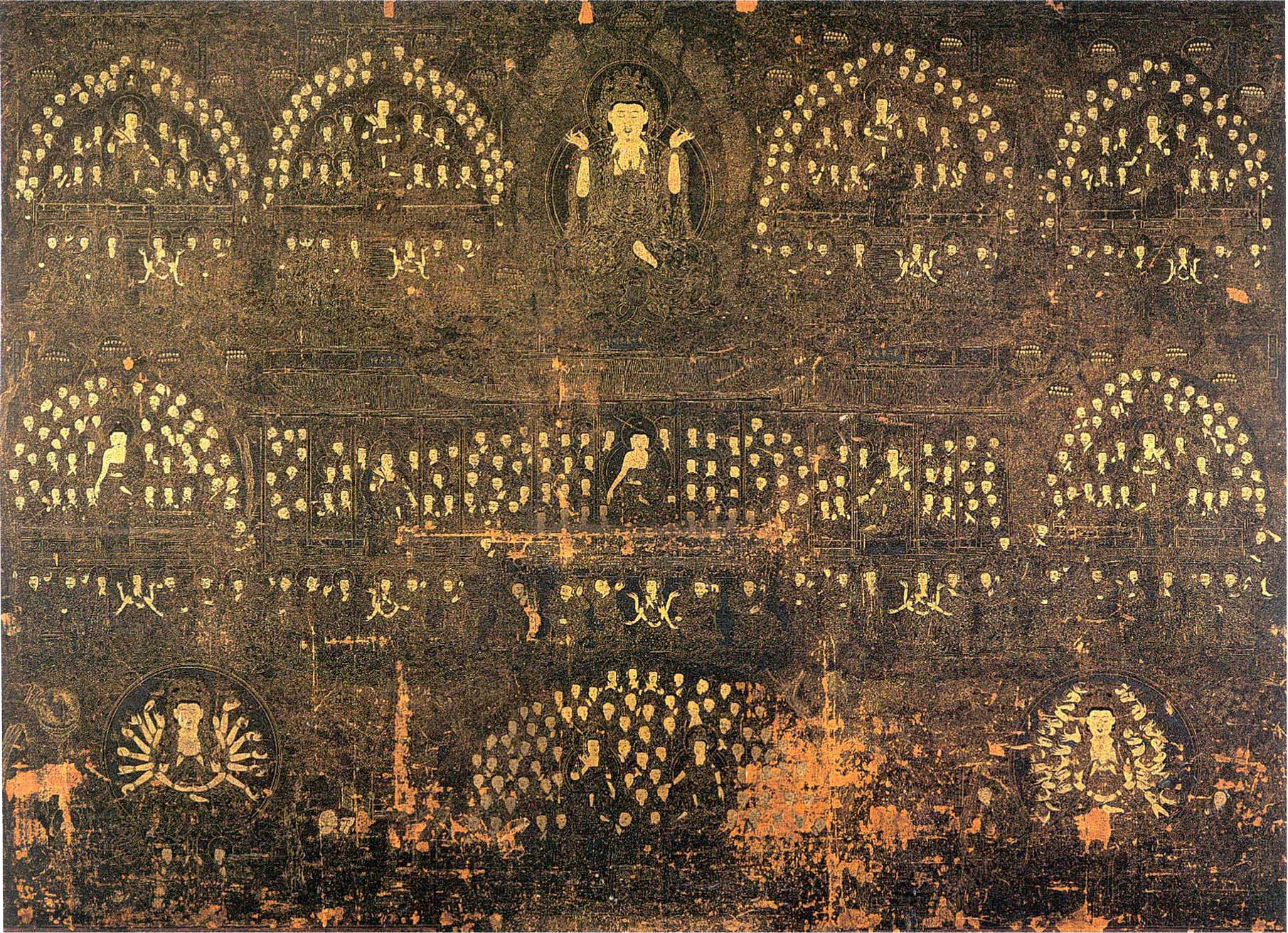
The Tongdosa Temple Hwaeumtang, a Joseon era tanka painting depicting the Huayan assemblies. It is a national treasure of South Korea.

In order to understand the vast number of texts and teachings they had received from India, Chinese Buddhist schools developed schematic classifications of these various teachings (called panjiao), such as the Five Periods and Eight Teachings of the Tiantai school.

The Huayan school patriarch Zhiyan developed a five tiered doctrinal classification of the Buddha's teaching which was expanded on by later figures such as Fazang. The five tiers are:

1. The Hinayana teachings found in the Agamas and Abhidharma which is grounded in not-self (anatman). Fazang calls this "the teaching of the existence of dharmas and the non-existence of the self."
2. The Mahayana teachings which focus on emptiness, non-arising and lack of form, and include the Prajñaparamita sūtras, Yogacara teachings on consciousness, and Madhyamaka sources like the Mulamadhyamakakarika.
3. The "Final" Mahayana teaching which according to Fazang teach the "eternal nature of the tathagatagarbha." Fazang writes that this teaching is based on buddha-nature sources like the Mahāyāna Mahāparinirvāṇa Sūtra, the Awakening of Faith, the Lankavatara, Srimaladevi sūtra, Ratnagotravibhaga, and Dilun shastra.
4. The Sudden Teaching, which is non-verbal and non-conceptual. This was associated with Vimalakirti's silence in the Vimalakirti sūtra by Fazang. Chengguan also associated this with the "sudden enlightenment" teachings of the Chan school.
5. The Complete or Perfect (Ch: yuan, lit. "Round") Teaching of the Avatamsaka sūtra and Huayan which teach both the interpenetration of principle (or buddha-nature) and phenomena as well as the interpenetration of all phenomena with each other.

Huayan and Chan had doctrinal arguments regarding which would be the correct concept of sudden awakening. The teachings of the Chan school were regarded as inferior by Huayan masters, a characterization which was rejected by Chan masters.

== Practice ==
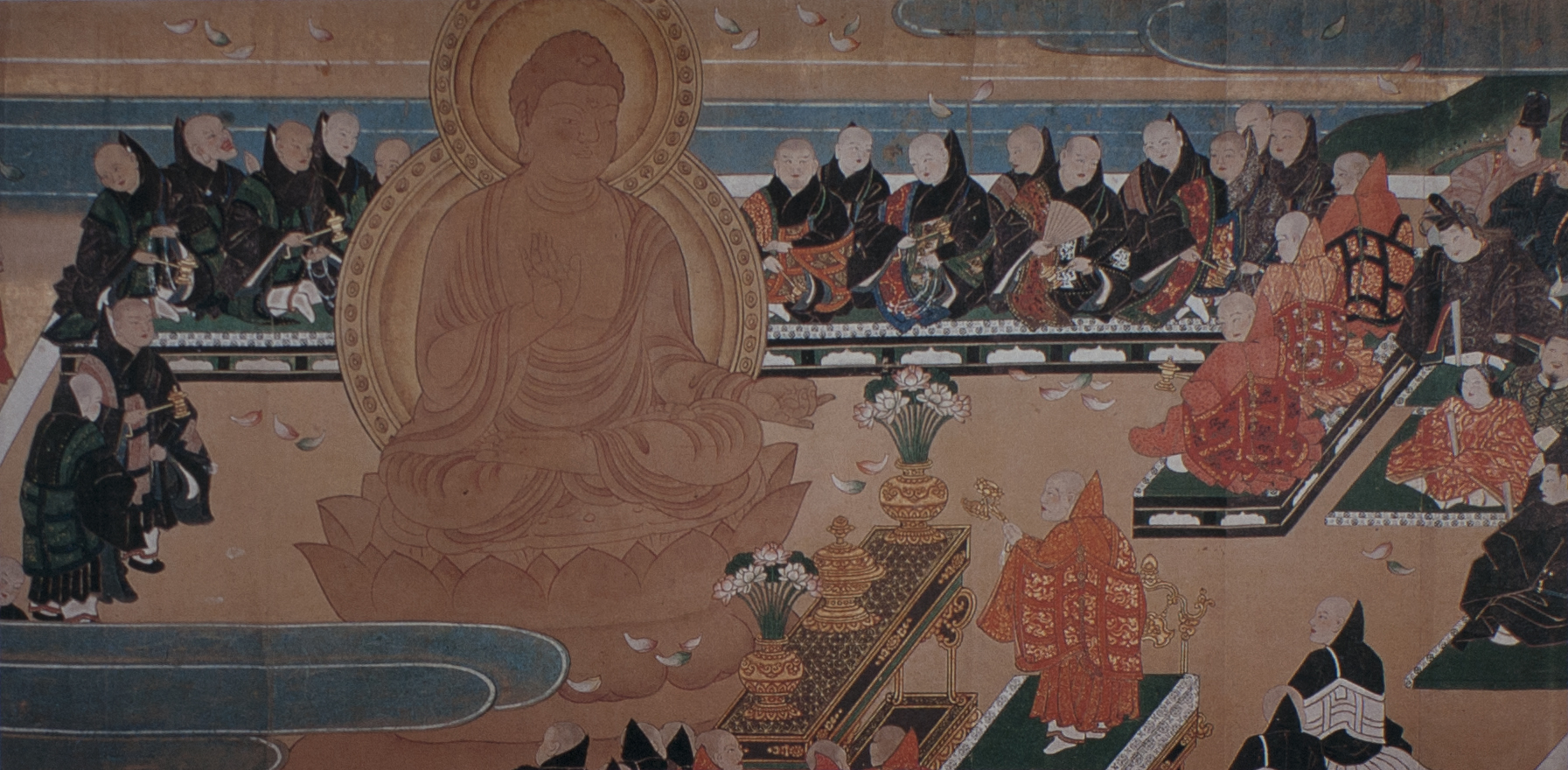
Depiction of a Huayan ritual in the Daibutsu Engi Emaki (1536), Tōdai-ji, Nara, Japan

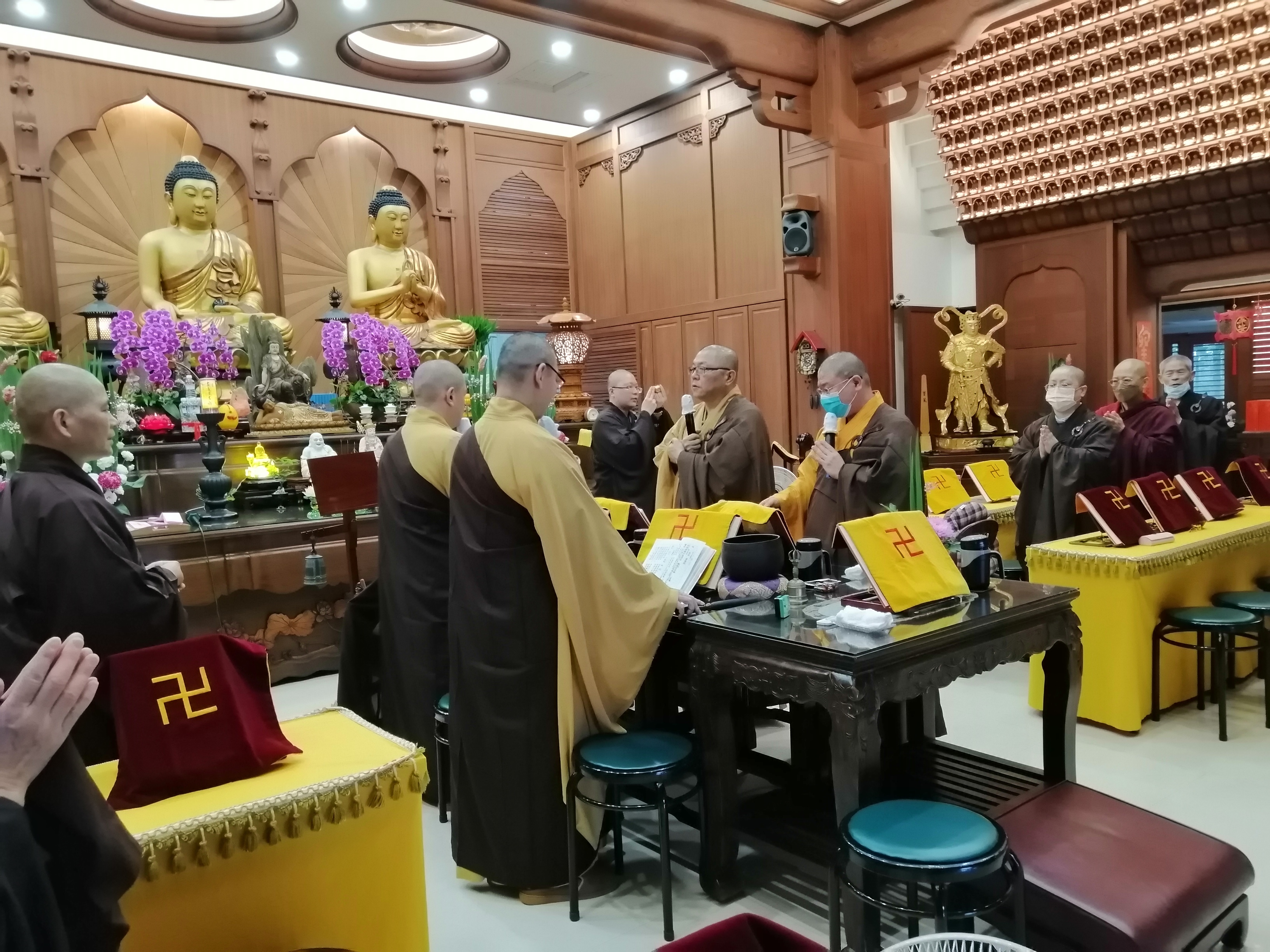
Huayen Puja at Yongmin Temple, Taipei

The Huayan school developed numerous practices as part of their conception of the bodhisattva path. These include devotional practices, studying, chanting and copying of the Avatamsaka sūtra, repentance rituals, recitation of dharanis, and meditation. These various elements might also be combined in ritual manuals such as The Practice of Samantabhadra's Huayan Dharma Realm Aspiration and Realization (華嚴普賢行願修證儀, Taisho Supplement, No. X1473) by Jinshui Jingyuan (靜源) which are still practiced together by Huayan communities during day long events.

=== Textual practices ===
According to Paul Williams, some of the central practices for the Huayan tradition were textual practices, such as the recitation of the Avataṃsaka Sūtra. The ritual chanting, studying and copying of the sūtra was often done in "Huayen Assemblies" (Huayanhui), who would meet regularly to chant the sūtra. Chanting the entire sūtra could take anywhere from a few weeks to several months.

Regular chanting of important passages from the sūtra is also common, particularly the Bhadracaryāpraṇidhāna (The Aspiration Prayer for Good Conduct), sometimes called the "Vows of Samantabhadra." Solo chanting practice was also common, and another common element of reciting the sūtra was bowing to the sūtra during the chanting. Since this practice is time-consuming, it was also often done in solitary retreats called biguan, which could last years.

Copying the entire sūtra (or passages from the sūtra) by hand was also another key practice in this tradition and some sūtra copyists were known for their excellent calligraphy. This practice was also sometimes combined with chanting and bowing as well. Sūtra copying is a traditional Buddhist practice which remains important in modern Chinese Buddhism. Another element that was sometimes added to this practice was to use one's own blood in the process of sūtra copying (sometimes just blood mixed with the ink). This blood writing was rare, but it was done by a few celebrated figures, like Hanshan Deqing (1546–1623) and the Republican Period monk Shouye.

=== Contemplation of Buddhas and bodhisattvas ===
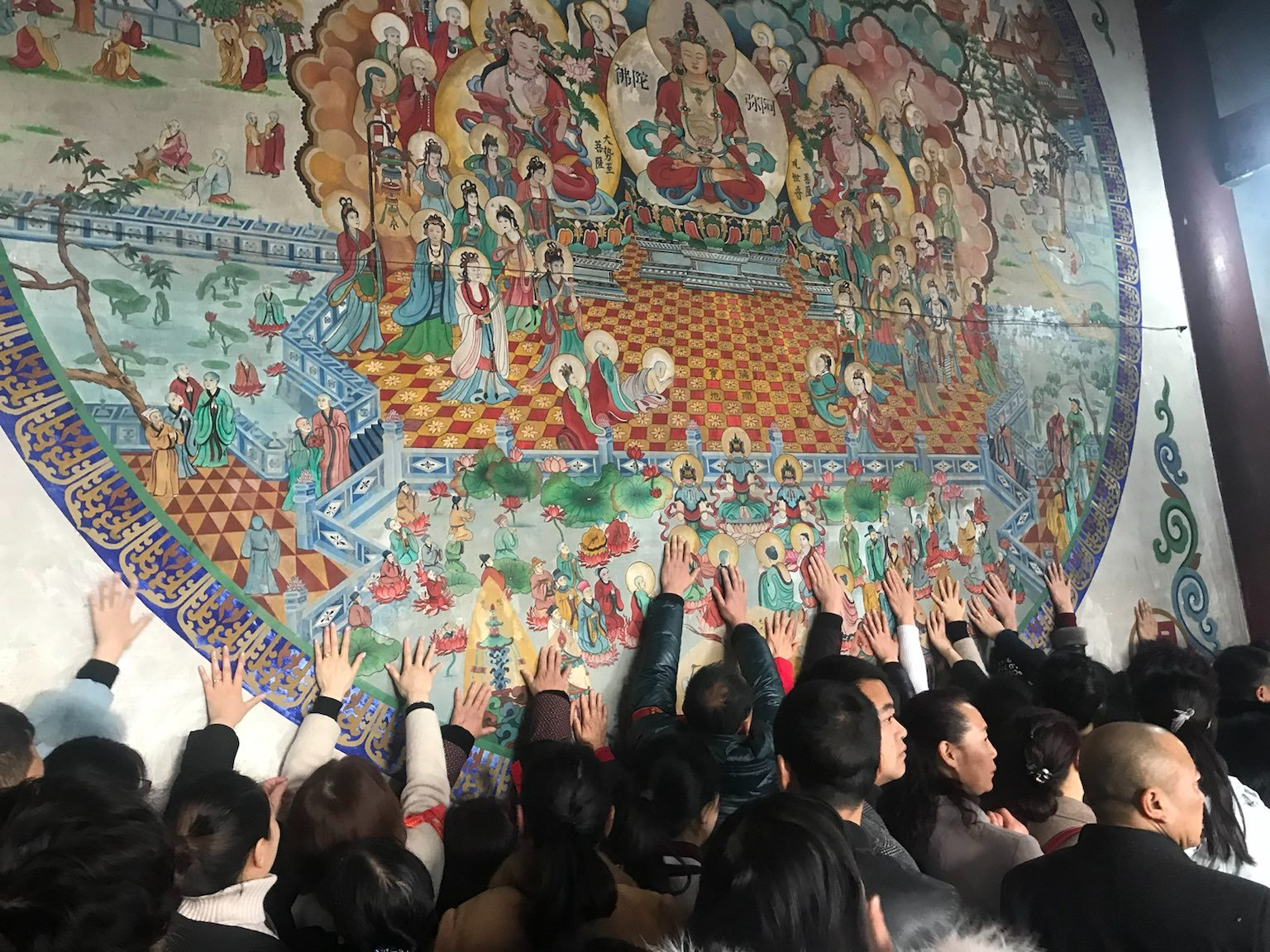
A Mandala inside Huayan Temple with Maitreya Buddha at its center

Another practice which is often highlighted in the Avatamsaka sūtra and in the Huayan school is that of buddhānusmṛti (Ch. nianfo), contemplation of the Buddha. In Chinese Buddhism, one popular method of contemplating the Buddha is to recite the Buddha's name. The practice of reciting the names of the Buddhas was also seen as a way to achieve rebirth in Vairocana's Pure Land, the Lotus Treasury World (Skt. Padmagarbha-lokadhātu; Ch. Lianhuazang shijie 蓮花藏世界). This Pure Land contains the entire universe, including our world, and it is identical with the entire Dharmadhatu. As such, for Huayan, our own world (known as the "Sahā world") is also the Lotus Storehouse Pure Land. Huayan also saw Vairocana's Pure land as non-dual and interfused with Amitabha's Pure Land of Sukhavati.

The practice of Buddha contemplation was promoted by various figures, such as the Huayan patriarchs Chengguan, Zongmi, the Goryeo monk Gyunyeo (923–973) and Peng Shaosheng, a householder scholar of the Qing dynasty.

The patriarch Guifeng Zongmi taught four types of buddhānusmṛti (nianfo), a schema that was also adopted by later Chinese figures: These four types of nianfo are the following:

- "Contemplation of the name" (chēngmíng niàn 稱名念), modeled on The Perfection of Wisdom Sūtra preached by Mañjuśrī (Taisho. 232). One selects Buddha, faces their direction, and then one mentally "holds" (chēngmíng 稱名) the sound of the name until one has a vision of all buddhas.
- "Contemplating an image" (guānxiàng niàn 觀像念), based on the Great Jewel Collection Sūtra (大寶積經, Dà bǎojī jīng, T.310), which entails contemplating the form of a Buddha by using a Buddha image.
- "Contemplating the visualization" (guānxiǎng niàn 觀想念), this entails contemplating a Buddha's body without the aid of a physical image, and is based on sūtras like Sūtra on the samadhi-ocean of the contemplation of the Buddha (T.643) and Sūtra on the samadhi of seated meditation (T.614).
- "Contemplating the true mark" (shíxiàng niàn 實相念), which entails the contemplation of the Dharmakaya, the true nature of all dharmas, Dharmata. This is "the true nature of the Buddha" according to The Perfection of Wisdom Sūtra Preached by Mañjuśrī, which is "unproduced and unextinguished, neither going nor coming, without name and without feature."

Another leading figure in the teaching of Huayan Nianfo was the 12th century Song monk Yihe (義和) who combined the method of nianfo with Huayan meditation teachings and the practice of the ten vows of Samantabhadra and saw this practice as a method of realizing the Huayan vision of ultimate reality. During the Qing, Baiting Xufa (1641–1728) and the lay scholar Peng Shaosheng (1740–1796) further promoted Huayan-Nianfo methods. Huayan Pure Land practice also sometimes included devotion to bodhisattvas like Avalokiteshvara. This promoted by figures like the Korean monks Ŭisang and Ch'ewŏn.

=== Visualization meditations ===
The lay scholar-practitioner Li Tongxuan (635–730) writes of a meditative practice based on the 9th chapter of the Avatamsaka sūtra. The practice, named "the contemplation of Buddhalight" (foguang guan), focused on contemplating and visualizing the universal light which is radiated by the Buddha in one's mind and expanding one's contemplation further and further outwards until it fills the entire universe. This contemplation of the Buddha's light leads to a state of joyful tranquility which leads to insight into emptiness. The meditative teachings of Li Tongxuan were especially influential on the Japanese Kegon monk Myōe, who promoted a similar practiced that he termed "the Samadhi of Contemplating the Buddha's Radiance" (Japanese: bukkō zanmaikan, 佛光三昧觀).

Another visualization type meditation was promoted by the Korean Huayan monk Ch'ewŏn. Ch'ewŏn taught visualization meditation (kwansang 觀想) on bodhisattva Avalokiteshvara. According to Ch'ewŏn, this is effective because Avalokiteśvara's sphere of realization, the essence of one's own mind and Avalokiteśvara and one's own body are mutually interfused and interpenetrating.

=== Meditation and the fourfold Dharmadhatu ===
Various Huayan texts provide different frameworks for the practice of meditation and the development of samadhi. Huayan sources mentions two key samadhis, the ocean-seal samadhi (Ch. haiyin sanmei) and the huayan samadhi (huayan sanmei). Some key Huayan sources which discuss meditation include Dushun's Contemplation of the Realm of Reality (Fajie guanmen) and The Ending of Delusion and the Return to the Source (Wangjin huanyuan) attributed to Fazang. Dushun's meditative framework was based on three main stages of contemplation: (1) seeing all dharmas as empty, (2) the harmony of all dharmas with the ultimate principle, and (3) seeing all dharmas as equally containing each other without obstruction. Another key Huayan contemplative text is the "Cessation and Contemplation in the Five Teachings of Huayan" (Huayan wujiao zhiguan 華嚴五教止觀).

The theory of the "fourfold Dharmadhatu" (sifajie, 四法界) eventually became the central meditative framework for the Huayan tradition. This doctrinal and meditative framework is explained in Chengguan's meditation manual titled "Meditative Perspectives on the Huayan Dharmadhatu" (Huayan Fajie Guanmen, 華嚴法界觀門) and its commentaries. The Dharmadhatu is the goal of the bodhisattva's practice, the ultimate nature of reality which must be known or entered into. According to Fox, the Fourfold Dharmadhatu is "four cognitive approaches to the world, four ways of apprehending reality."

These four ways of seeing reality are:

1. All dharmas are seen as particular separate events or phenomena (shi 事). This is the mundane way of seeing and is not a contemplation or meditation, but the pre-meditative perspective.
2. All events are an expression of li (理, the ultimate principle), which is associated with the concepts of "true emptiness," "One Mind" (yi xin 一心) and Buddha nature. This is the first level of Huayan meditation.
3. This is the "non-obstruction of principle and phenomena" (lishi wuai 理事無礙), i.e. their interpenetration and interfusion.
4. All events / phenomena interpenetrate (shishi wuai 事事無礙), which refers to how "all distinct phenomenal dharmas interfuse and penetrate in all ways" (Zongmi). This is also described as "universal pervasion and complete accommodation."

According to Fox, "these dharmadhatus are not separate worlds – they are actually increasingly more holographic perspectives on a single phenomenological manifold...they more properly represent four types or orders of perspectives on experience." Furthermore, for Huayan, this contemplation is the solution to the problem of suffering which lies in the "fixation or attachment to a particular perspective. What we think are the essences of objects are really therefore nothing but mere names, mere functional designations, and none of these contextual definitions need necessarily interfere with any of the others."

Regarding the practical application of this teaching, Baiting Xufa correlated the practice of nianfo with the fourfold Dharmadhatu as follows:

1. Nianfo on the level of the realm of phenomena refers to reciting the name of the Buddha as if the Buddha was external to oneself.
2. Nianfo on the level of the ultimate principle refers to reciting nianfo while knowing it as mind-only (cittamatra).
3. Nianfo practice on the level of "non-obstruction of principle and phenomena" refers to a nianfo practice which has transcended notions like "buddha," "mind" and "name of the buddha."
4. Nianfo on the level of the interpenetration of all dharmas refers to the realization that the name of Buddha and the mind is all pervasive throughout the one true dharmadhatu.

=== Esoteric practices ===
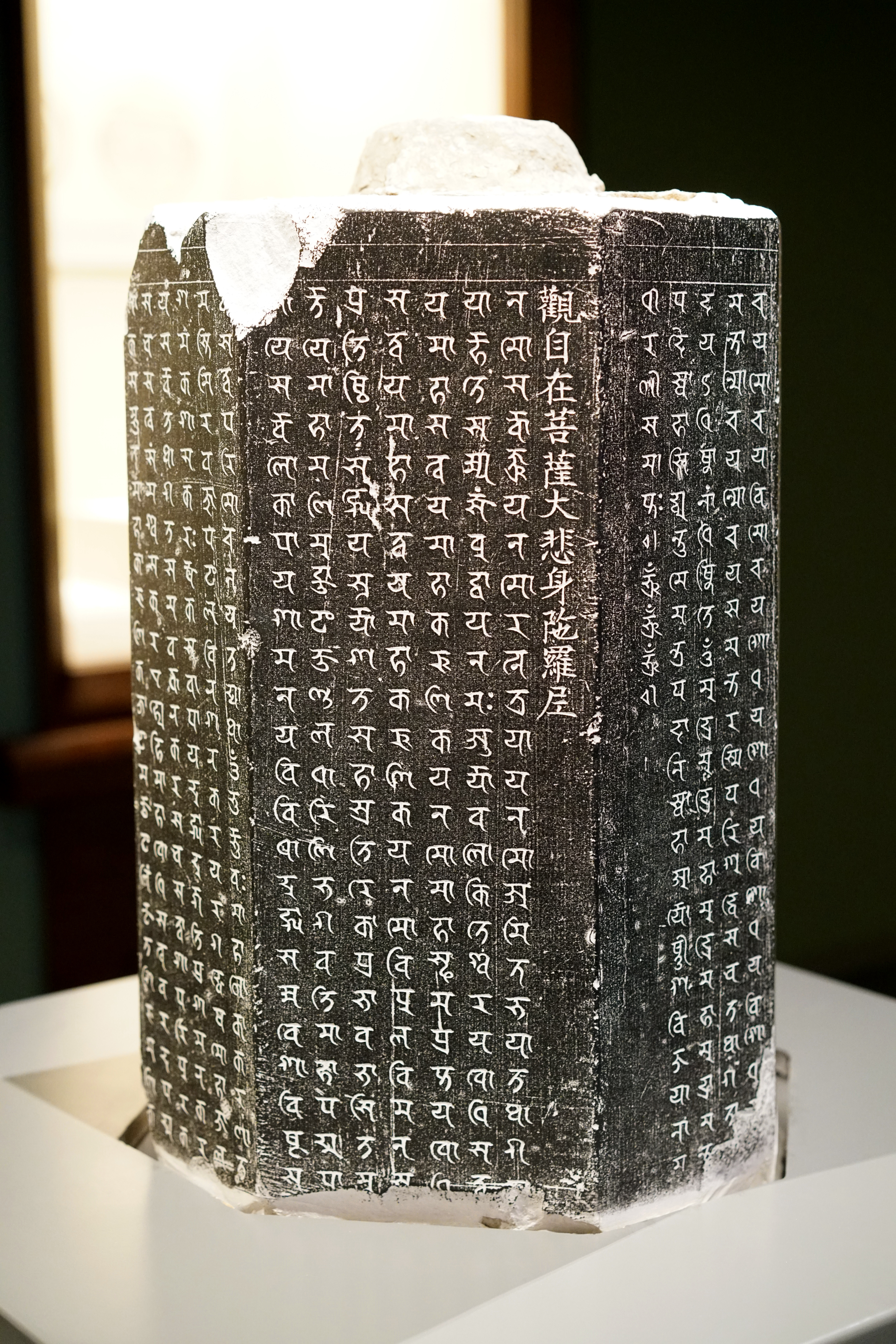
A Dharani Pillar from the Liao Dynasty

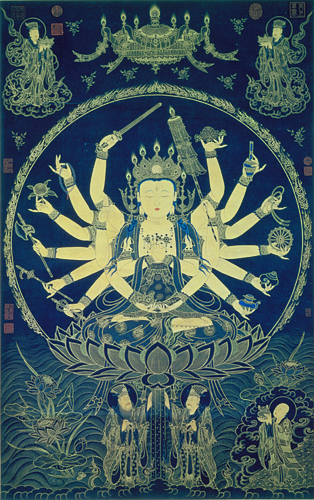
A Ming era hanging scroll of Cundi, a central figure in Huayan esotericism

Fazang promoted the practice of several dharanis, such as the Xuanzang's version of the Dhāraṇī of Avalokiteśvara-ekadaśamukha.

The synthesis of Huayan with Chinese Esoteric Buddhist practices was a feature of the Buddhism of the Khitan Liao Dynasty. Jueyuan, a Huayan monk from Yuanfu Temple during the Liao Dynasty and author of the Dari jing yishi yanmi chao, practiced esoteric rituals like Homa and Abhiseka based on the Vairocanābhisaṃbodhi Sūtra and the tradition of Yixing. Furthermore, according to Sorensen, the iconography of the Huayan Vairocana Buddha and the Esoteric Mahavairocana also became fused during the post-Tang period.

Perhaps the most important figure in the synthesis of Huayan and Chinese Esoteric Buddhism was the 11th century monk Daoshen (道蝗), author of the Xianmi yuantong chengfo xinyao ji (顯密圓通成佛心要集 Collection of Essentials for the Attainment of Buddhahood by Total [Inter-]Penetration of the Esoteric and the Exoteric, T1955). The work is divided into three parts. Part one summarizes the Huayan philosophy, which Daoshen sees as the highest form of the explicit or manifest Buddhist teachings. It also discusses the praxis of Huayan, here called "cultivating the ocean of Samantabhadra's practices," which includes numerous exoteric Buddhist practices such as breath meditation, meditation on emptiness, prostrations, offerings, confession rites, vows, and buddha name recitation.

The second part of this work teaches esoteric Buddhism or mantra method (Mijiao, Zhenyan), with a focus on the Cundi dharani and other mantras (like the Mani mantra) which are said to have many powerful effects and is recommended even for laypersons. Finally, the third part promotes "the systematic integration of exoteric doctrine and occult practice, arguing that each is incomplete without the other, whether they are practised in sequence or in tandem."

According to Gimello:

Daozhen's central thesis in the work is that the "body" of Huayan doctrine and the envisaged image of Cundi are somehow co-inherent, and that by invoking the presence of the goddess we somehow confirm the truth of the doctrines and render them practically efficacious. In other words, Daozhen holds that if one recites Cundi dharani and/or visualizes the dharani in its graphic form as an array of Sanskrit letters or Chinese characters, and then imagines the goddess's anthropomorphic bodily image emerging from the intoned and envisioned syllables of the spell, all the while performing the corresponding manual gestures (mudra), one will thereby both quicken and verify the truth of the doctrines, and one will do this not merely allegorically but also, if I may say so, sacramentally.

Important esoteric texts used in the Liao tradition included the: Cundī-dhāraṇī, the Usṇīsavijayā-dhāranī, the Nīlakaṇthaka-dhāranī and the Sūtra on the Great Dharma Torch Dhāraṇī ( 大法炬陀羅尼 經, Da faju tuoluoni jing) among others. In the Liao, stupas, pagodas and statues were often empowered with dharanis and mantras. These structures would often be filled or inscribed with dharanis, sūtras, or mantras like the Six syllable mantra of Avalokiteshvara. Pillars inscribed with dhāraṇīs and mantras were also common.

The synthesis of Esoteric Buddhist practice with Huayan Buddhism remained popular during the Jin dynasty (1115–1234), where Usṇīsavijayā and Cundī practices were some of the most popular. A similar synthesis of Huayan-Chan Buddhism (derived from Zongmi) with esoteric Buddhist teachings and practices from Tibetan Buddhism (mainly Sakya and Kagyu) also occurred in Buddhism of the Western Xia (1038–1227) dynasty.

Dharanis like the Cundī-dhāraṇī, the Usṇīsavijayā-dhāranī, and the Nīlakaṇthaka-dhāranī remain important in modern Huayan Buddhism and are chanted in modern Dharma assemblies. Another dharani / esoteric practice in modern Huayan is the contemplation of the 42 Avatamsaka syllables (a version of the arapacana alphabet, which is a contemplation found in various Mahayana sources).

The Japanese Kegon school was known for adopting many esoteric mantras and practices from the Shingon school. The Kegon monk Myōe was known for his widespread promotion of the popular Mantra of Light (kōmyō shingon, 光明眞言). Due to influence from the Shingon school, today's Kegon school retains numerous esoteric Buddhist elements.

=== The path and sudden awakening ===
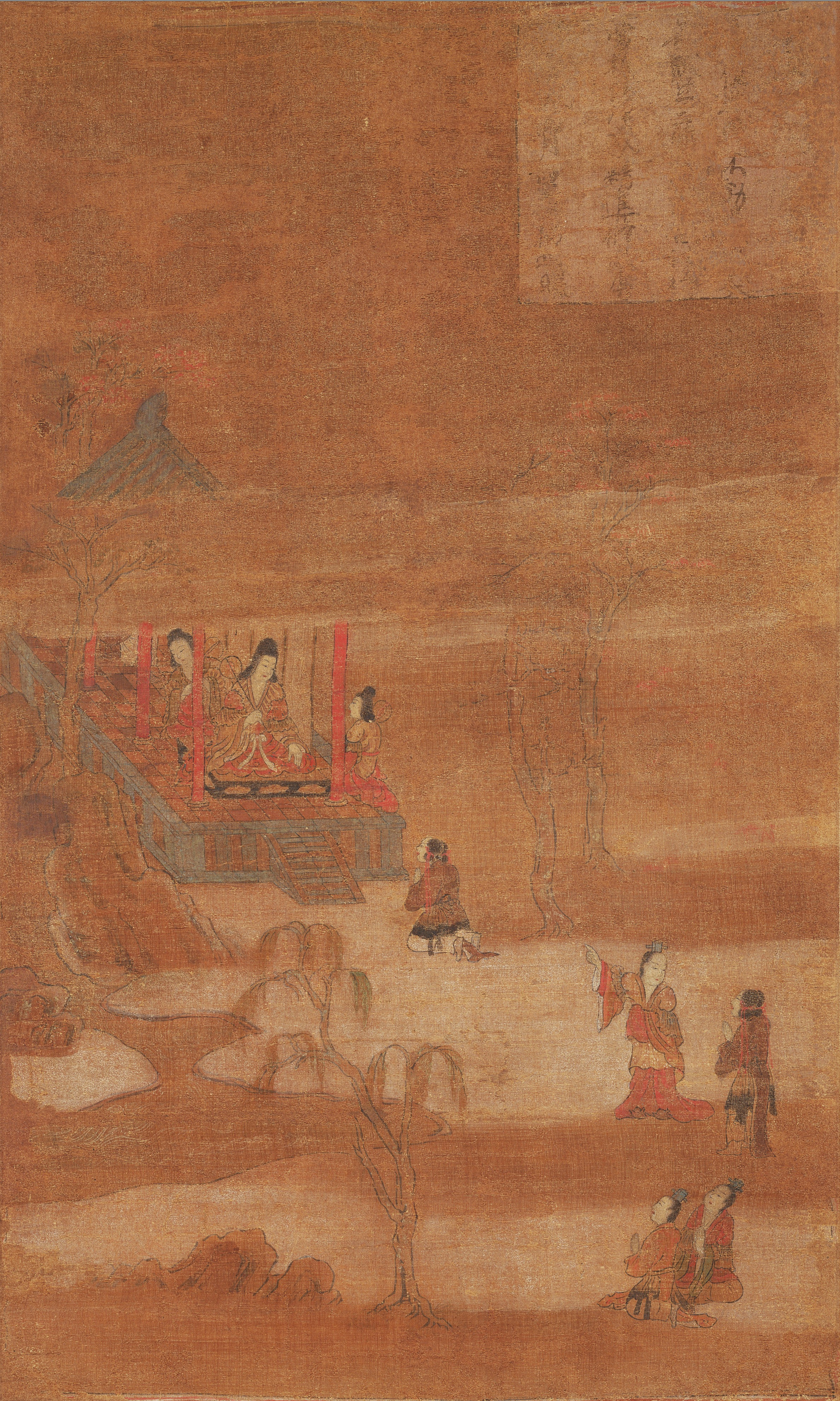
Illustration of Sudhana's Pilgrimage in the Gandhavyuha sūtra, from the Heian period, Nara National Museum, Japan

The Huayan school defended a sudden awakening view. This is because the buddha-nature is already present in all sentient beings, and also because their theory of universal interpenetration entails that Buddhahood is interfused with the very first stage of a bodhisattva's path. Thus, according to patriarch Fazang, "when one first arouses the thought of enlightenment [bodhicitta] one also becomes perfectly enlightened."

Similarly, according to Gimello, Huayan master Li Tongxuan understands the path as follows:

The first access of faith in the mind of the practitioner is in itself the culmination of the entire path, the very realization of final Buddhahood.... 'Faith' or confidence in the possibility of enlightenment is nothing but enlightenment itself, in an anticipatory and causative modality.

This interpenetration of all elements of the path to awakening is also a consequence of the Huayan view of time, which sees all moments as interfused (including a sentient being's present practice and their eventual future Buddhahood aeons from now). Since time itself is empty, all moments (past, present, and future) are interfused with each other. As Fazang writes, "beginning and end Interpenetrate. On each [bodhisattva] stage, one is thus both a Bodhisattva and a Buddha."

As such, Huayan does not understand a bodhisattva's progress through the bodhisattva stages (bhumis) as being linear. Instead, as soon as one reaches the earlier stages of "perfection of faith" (which is part of Huayan's 52 bhumi model), one has also acquired all the stages, as well as Buddhahood. This doctrine of "enlightenment at the stage of faith" (信滿成佛, xinman cheng fo) was a unique feature of Huayan and was first introduced by Fazang though it has a precedent in a passage of the Avatamsaka Sūtra.

In Huayan, Buddhahood transcends all concepts, times and stages. Because practice cannot create something that is not immanent, Huayan sees the bodhisattva path as simply revealing what is already there (buddha-nature, which is buddhahood itself concealed within sentient beings). In spite of this doctrine, Huayan patriarchs also argued that the gradual practices of the bodhisattva stages are still necessary. This is because all stages retain their particularity even while being wholly interfused and only through the practice of the bodhisattva path does the immanent Buddhahood manifest.

Thus, according to Li Tongxuan "there is no other enlightenment" than simply following the bodhisattva path, and furthermore:

Primordial wisdom is made manifest through meditation; cultivation does not create it or bring it into being. If one simply follows the Bodhisattva Path and learns the bodhisattva practices, primordial wisdom will shine forth of itself....

Similarly, patriarch Zongmi held that Buddhahood is reached through "sudden awakening followed by gradual cultivation" and he also held that "sudden and gradual are not only not contradictory, but are actually complementary."

== Sources ==
- Buswell, Robert E. (1991), The "Short-cut" Approach of K'an-hua Meditation: The Evolution of a Practical Subitism in Chinese Ch'an Buddhism. In: Peter N. Gregory (editor)(1991), Sudden and Gradual. Approaches to Enlightenment in Chinese Thought, Delhi: Motilal Banarsidass Publishers Private Limited
- Buswell, Robert E (1993), Ch'an Hermeneutics: A Korean View. In: Donald S. Lopez, Jr. (ed.)(1993), Buddhist Hermeneutics, Delhi: Motilal Banarsidass
- Chang, Garma C.C. (1992), The Buddhist teaching of Totality. The Philosophy of Hwa Yen Buddhism, Delhi: Motilal Banarsidass Publishers
- Cleary, Thomas, trans. (1993). The Flower Ornament Scripture: A Translation of the Avatamsaka Sūtra. ISBN 0-87773-940-4
- Cook, Francis H (1977), Hua-Yen Buddhism: The Jewel Net of Indra, Penn State Press, ISBN 0-271-02190-X
- Dumoulin, Heinrich (2005), Zen Buddhism: A History. Volume 1: India and China, World Wisdom Books, ISBN 978-0-941532-89-1
- Garfield, Jay L.; Edelglass, William (2011), The Oxford Handbook of World Philosophy, Oup USA, ISBN 9780195328998
- Gimello, Robert; Girard, Frédéric; Hamar, Imre (2012). Avataṃsaka Buddhism in East Asia: Huayan, Kegon, Flower Ornament Buddhism; origins and adaptation of a visual culture, Asiatische Forschungen: Monographienreihe zur Geschichte, Kultur und Sprache der Völker Ost- u. Zentralasiens, Wiesbaden: Harrassowitz, ISBN 978-3-447-06678-5.
- Hamar, Imre (2007), Reflecting Mirrors: Perspectives on Huayan Buddhism (Asiatische Forschungen Vol. 151), Wiesbaden: Harrassowitz, ISBN 978-3447055093
- Lai, Whalen (2003), Buddhism in China: A Historical Survey. In Antonio S. Cua (ed.): Encyclopedia of Chinese Philosophy (PDF), New York: Routledge, archived from the original (PDF) on November 12, 2014
- Wright, Dale S. (1982), The Significance of Paradoxical Language in Hua-Yen Buddhism. In: Philosophy East and West 32 (3):325-338, archived from the original on April 12, 2014
