= Maṇi Kambum =

Tibetan Buddhist terma text

The Maṇi Kambum (Tibetan: མ་ཎི་བཀའ་འབུམ་, Wylie: ma Ni bka' 'bum, "Collected teachings on Mani") is a Tibetan Buddhist terma text which contains teachings connected with the bodhisattva Avalokiteśvara. The Maṇi Kambum was composed over time by different hands. It was likely composed from the 12th century to the 13th century.

== Overview ==
The Maṇi Kambum is traditionally attributed to the Tibetan king Songtsen Gampo. It is traditionally said to be a revelation of three different Tibetan masters: siddha Ngöndrup, Nyangrel Nyima Özer, and Śākya Ö. The work focuses on the compassionate bodhisattva Avalokiteśvara which is promoted here as the patron deity of Tibet. In the Maṇi Kambum, Songtsen Gampo is said to be an emanation of Avalokiteśvara who arrived in Tibet in order to spread the Buddha's Dharma.

The Maṇi Kambum is a very important work for the culture and history of Tibetan Buddhism as well as Tibet in general. The text is connected with the rise in popularity of Avalokiteśvara devotion in Tibet from the 12th to the 14th century. It is also influenced by the Kāraṇḍavyūha Sūtra, which is the source of the Mani mantra.

The Maṇi Kambum is divided into three major sections or cycles:

1. The Cycle of Sūtras (mdo skor), revealed by Śākya Ö, which contains myths and legends of Avalokiteśvara and Songtsen Gampo.
2. The Cycle of Attainment (sgrub skor) by siddha Ngöndrup, which contains several ritual manuals for deity yoga. These manuals are called "means of achievement" (sgrub thabs; Skt. sādhanas) and focus on Avalokiteśvara.
3. The Cycle of Precepts (zhal gdams kyi skor) by Nyangrel Nyima Özer, which contains 150 short texts dealing with doctrine and meditation.
