= Cundi =

Cundi can refer to:

- Cundi, Angola
- Cundi, Ethiopia
- Cundi (Buddhism)
- Cundī Dhāraṇī, a Buddhist mantra in China
- Cundi (footballer), real name: Secundino Suárez
