= Nyangrel Nyima Özer =

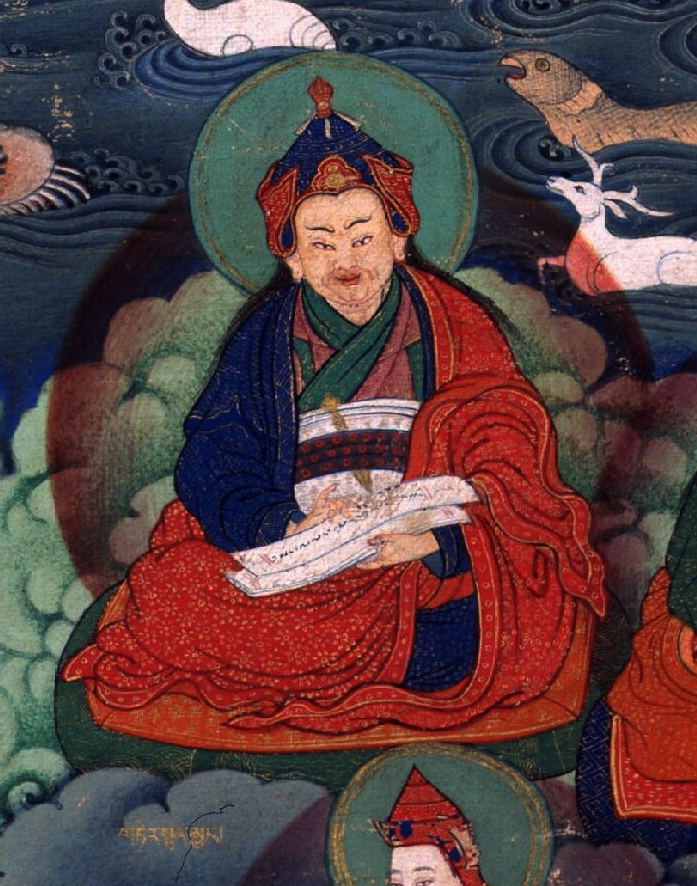

Nyangrel Nyima Özer (Tibetan: ཉང་རལ་ཉི་མ་འོད་ཟེར, Wylie: nyang ral nyi ma 'od zer, c. 1124–1192) was an important Nyingma tertön, a revealer of terma treasure texts in Tibetan Buddhism.

== Overview ==
Nyima Özer was considered to be a reincarnation of King Trisong Detsen. He was a lay yogi and had two sons: Nam mkha’ ‘od zer and Nam’mkha’ dpal ba (who was also his main disciple and heir). Nyang Ral Nyima Özer had several teachers, in particular, he studied with his father - the great master Nyangtona. His teachers were Gyanonpa Tondo, Zhikpo Nyima Senge, Mel and Kavachepa Tonpa Khache. Guru Chowang (Gu ru chos kyi dbang phyug, 1212-1270) was considered to have been a reincarnation of Nyima Özer.

He was born in 1124 or 1136 in Lhodrak to Nyangtona Choki Khorlo and his wife, Pema Devatsel. According to traditional Tibetan literature, when he was eight years old, he had visions of Sakyamuni Buddha, Avalokitesvara and Padmasambhava. Padmasambhava appeared to him, gave him teachings and a list of termas. He discovered many volumes of treasure teachings, such as: the Maṇi Kambum, the Tantra of the Gathering of the Sugatas of the Eight Transmitted Precepts, and the doctrinal Cycles of the Great Compassionate One, the Peaceful and Wrathful Aspects of the Guru, and the Cycle of Mahakala and Malevolent Mantra.

Nyima Özer also wrote a history of Padmasambhava and is considered one of the main creators of the influential Tibetan Padmasambhava cult. According to Germano, "it may be that it was the towering figure of Nyang ral nyi ma ’od zer – one of the main architects of the Padmasambhava mythos – who first linked Padmasambhava to the Great Perfection in a high-profile manner."

Likewise, his discovery of the Maṇi Kambum had a great influence on the Tibetan worship of Chenrezig (Avalokitesvara).

Nyima Özer is also known for his revelation of the "Crown Pith" series of Dzogchen tantras, which according to David Germano, "belongs to newer Padmasambhava-centric Great Perfection traditions emerging in the twelfth century." Though these texts may have also been further expanded and edited by his son and by Guru Chowang. Germano explains these texts as follows:

The content is fairly uniform: the texts are very philosophically oriented, and overflowing with a variety of symbolic literary devices such as allegory, symbolic encoding, striking images, and so forth. There is almost no exposition of techniques, ritualistic or contemplative, and also little in the way of funerary influences. In short, the texts are philosophical poetry rather than practical handbooks of praxis techniques; instead of the blood and violence of later tantra, we find lyrical and elegant verses on light and darkness, purity and pollution, freedom and bondage, illusion and reality, plurality and unity, embodiment and mind.

Germano also writes that

there is a constant motif throughout the literature of the superiority of Crown Pith to the Great Perfection or Transcendence Yoga, indicating that competing Great Perfection movements formed some of its main targets. The subordinated Transcendent Pith Great Perfection (A ti rdzogs chen) is consistently associated more with the side of manifestation and vision and is described as retaining a degree of exertion, conceptuality, and focus on appearances, while the Crown Pith is presented as an uncompromising non-duality zeroed in on original purity (ka dag), one of the most common terms in the text. The tradition never really took off beyond Nyang ral nyi ma ’od zer and his immediate disciples.

== Sources ==
- Dudjom Rinpoche (Jikdrel Yeshe Dorje). The Nyingma School of Tibetan Buddhism Its Fundamentals and History. Trans. Matthew Kapstein. Boston: Wisdom Publications, 1991.
- Phillips, Bradford Lyman. Consummation and Compassion in medieval Tibet: The Maṇi bka’-’bm chen-mo of Guru Chos-kyi Dbang-phyug. Diss. U of Virginia, 2004.
- Germano, David (2005), "Dzogchen", in Jones, Lindsay (ed.), Macmillan Encyclopedia of Religion. Vol.4: Dacian Riders – Esther, MacMillan Reference USA.
- Germano, David (2005b), "The Funerary Transformation of the Great Perfection (Rdzogs chen)", Journal of the International Association of Tibetan Studies (1): 1–54
