= Cundi (Buddhism) =

Female deity in Vajrayana Buddhism

Chundī
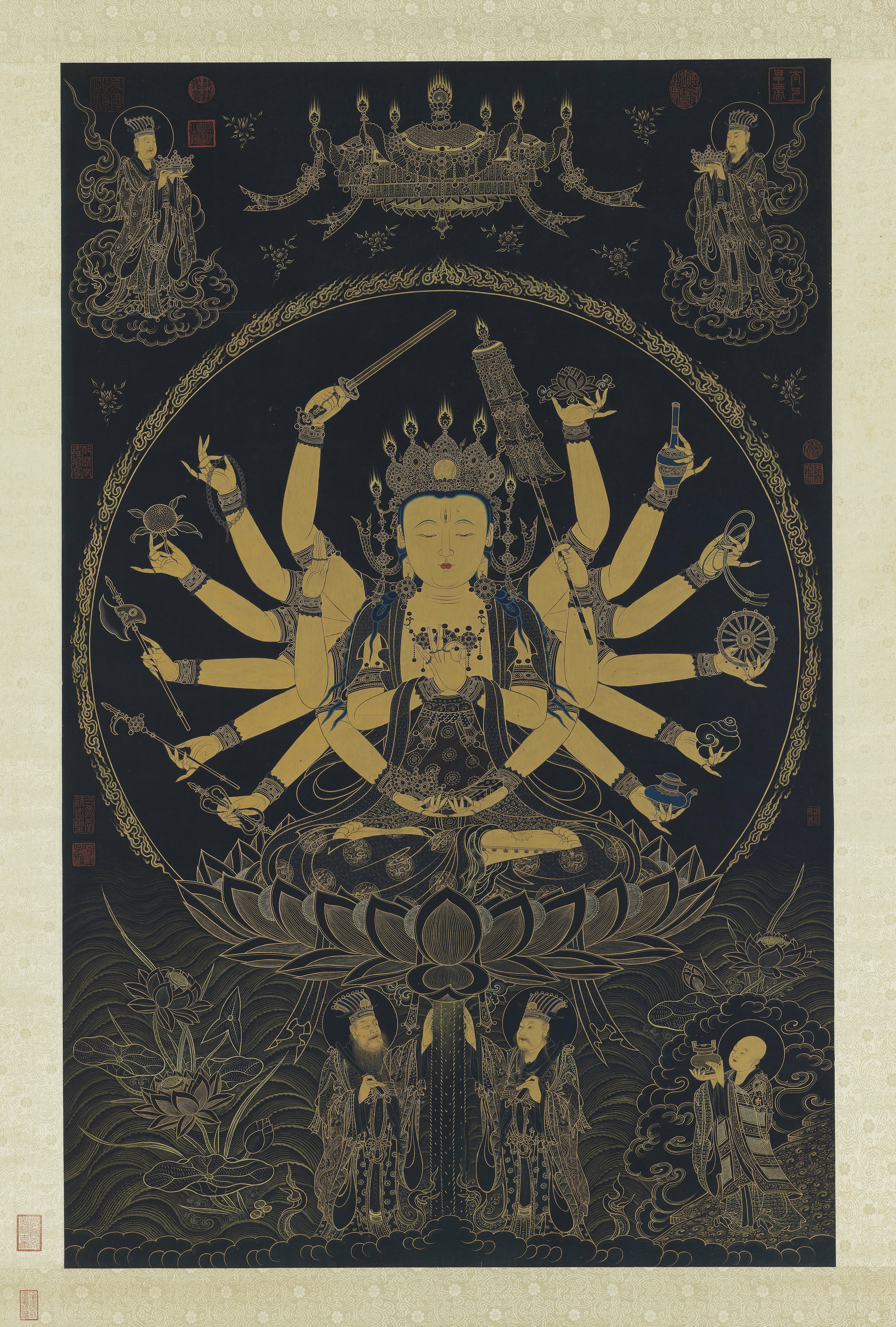
- Hanging scroll depicting the eighteen-armed form of Cundī, China, Ming Dynasty (1368–1644)
- Sanskrit: IAST: Cundī; Cuṇḍī; Cundā; Cundavajrī; Saptakoṭibuddhamatṛ
- Chinese: 準提菩薩 (traditional) 准提菩萨 (simplified) (Pinyin: Zhǔntí Púsà) 準提佛母 (Zhǔntí Fómǔ) 七俱胝佛母 (Qījùzhī Fómǔ)
- Japanese: 准胝観音 準胝観音 準提観音 (Jundei / Juntei Kannon) 准胝仏母 (Juntei / Jundei Butsumo) 七倶胝仏母 (Shichikutei Butsumo)
- Khmer: ព្រះចុន្ទីពោធិសត្វ
- Korean: 준제보살 (RR: Junje Bosal)
- Tagalog: Kundi
- Thai: พระจุนฑีโพธิสัตว์
- Tibetan: སྐུལ་བྱེད་མ; Wylie: skul byed ma
- Vietnamese: Chuẩn Đề Bồ tát Phật Mẫu Chuẩn Đề

Information
- Venerated by: Mahayana, Vajrayana: (Kāraṇḍavyūhasūtra); (Cundī Dhāraṇī Sūtra)

Cundī (Sanskrit, IPA: [t͜ɕʊndiː]; Chinese: 準提; pinyin: Zhǔntí; Japanese: Juntei; Tibetan: ལྷ་མོ་སྐུལ་བྱེད་མ།, Wylie: lha mo skul byed ma, THL: lha-mo kül-jé-ma) or Cundā (IPA: [t͜ɕʊndaː]; Ch: 羅馬化) is a female Indian Buddhist deity who remains popular in East Asian Buddhism. In Chinese Buddhism, she is associated with the practice of the well known Cundī dharani, which is performed along with a specific mudra (hand gesture), as well as the use of a circular mirror. She is considered to be able to purify negative karma, provide protection, and support spiritual practice which allows one to quickly attain Buddhahood.

This deity is also called by various other names and epithets, including Cundavajrī, Saptakoṭi Buddha-bhagavatī ("The Blessed Buddha of the Seventy Million", 七俱胝佛母), "Zhunti Buddha Mother" (準提佛母, Zhǔntí Fómǔ) in Chinese and Saptakoṭibuddhamatṛ ("Mother of Seventy Million Buddhas", though this Sanskrit reconstruction of 佛母 is speculative).

Some depictions of Cundī share many iconographic and symbolic elements with another female Buddhist deity, Prajñāpāramitā Devi. As such, some images of these goddesses are difficult to identify.

In Tibetan Buddhism she is known by the name Lhamo Cunda, Chunde or Cundi ('Lhamo' in Tibetan is 'Devi' in Sanskrit, a term of veneration meaning 'goddess').

== In India ==
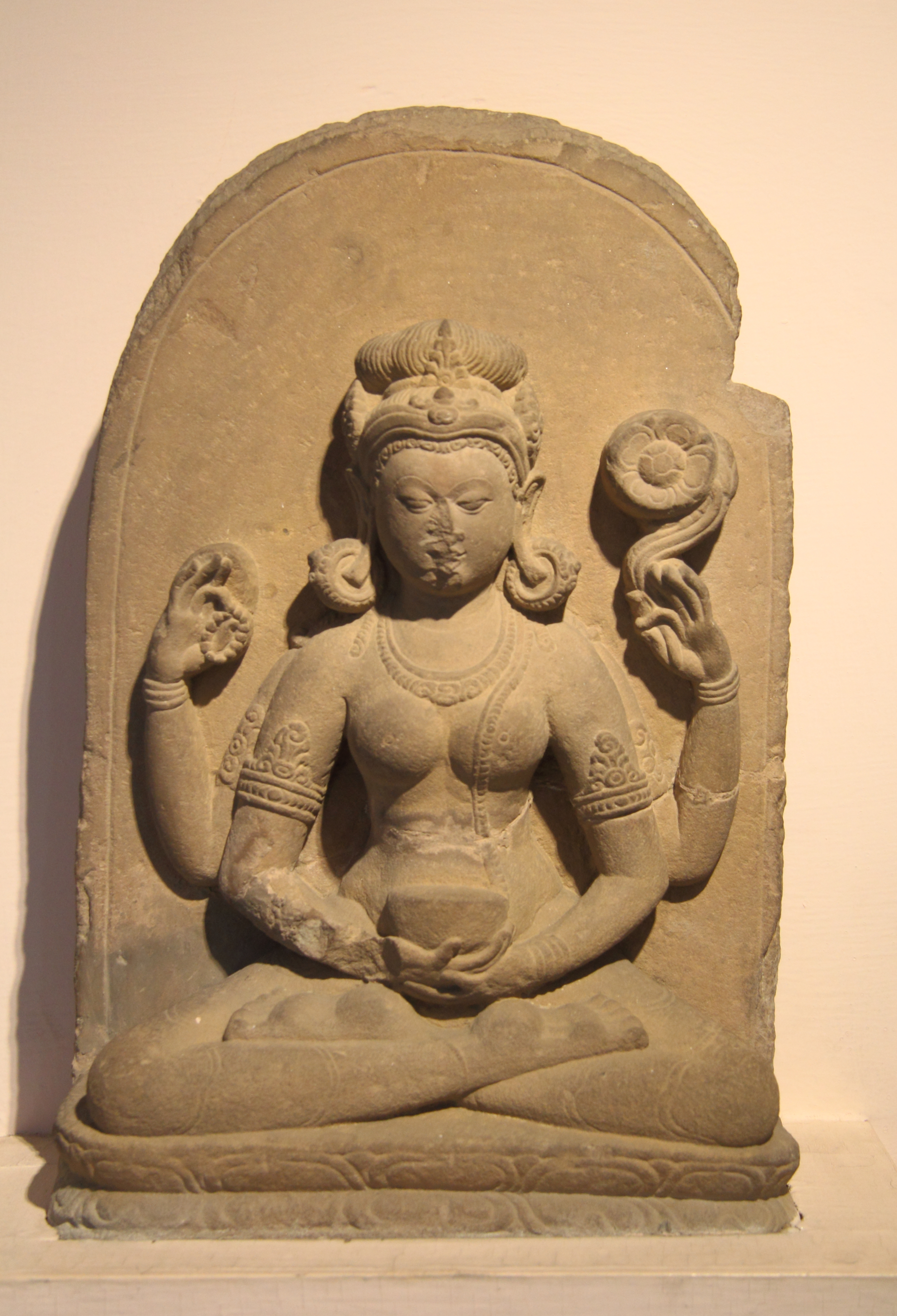
Stone statue of Chunda from Sarnath (Uttar Pradesh), time of Gahadavala dynasty, 11th century CE, National Museum, New Delhi

=== Name ===
The name Cundī (along with other variations like Cundā, Cundrā, Candrā, Caṇḍā, and Cuṇḍrā) refers to an Indian Mahayana Buddhist deity found in numerous Indian sources such as the Śikṣāsamuccaya, Cundādhāriṇī Sūtra, Sādhanamālā, Niṣpannayogāvalī, Mañjuśrīmūlakalpa and the Guhyasamāja. Conze notes that the Tibetan terms for the goddess goes back to the Sanskrit: Cundī, Caṇḍī (a name for Hindu goddess Durga), Cunda, Chundi, or Cuṇṭi. Benoytosh Bhattacharyya argues the correct Sanskrit name should be Cundā.

The deity's mantra, "oṃ cale cule cunde svāhā," seems to indicate the original name being Cundā. Peter Alan Roberts comments, in a note to a translation of the Tibetan version of the Kāraṇḍavyūhasūtra: "Cale cule cunde are the vocative forms of Calā, Culā, and Cundā, three variations of her name. Cundi is the vocative for Cundī."

The meaning of these names is not always clear. The name Cundī connotes a low caste woman, prostitute or other low class female position (such as a madam/procuress). Robert Gimello and the Princeton Dictionary of Buddhism claim that the deity may have emerged as a local yakshini that became important in Indian Buddhism in around the 8th century.

According to The Practical Sanskrit-English Dictionary, the word Cuṇḍā in Sanskrit can also mean a small well or reservoir.

Regarding Candrā, the name means moon in Sanskrit and the goddess is often described as being the color of the moon.

In Japanese Buddhism, there is no agreed upon etymology. Proposals include Śundhi (purity), Sunda (bright and beautiful), Cuṇṭi (well), or Cuṇḍī (to become smaller). Oda Tokunō (織田得能) interpreted the name as "purity, in praise of the purity of mind and nature" which refers to the Dharmakāya (in Bukkyo daijiten [Buddhist Dictionary], rev. ed. Tokyo 1954, p. 993b, s.v. "Juntei 準提"). According to C. N. Tay, "the Fo Guang Buddhist Dictionary, ed. Ding Fubao (丁福保) follows this interpretation."

=== In Indian Buddhist sources ===
An 11th century manuscript of the Aṣṭasāhasrikā Prajñāpāramitā Sūtra (at the Cambridge University Library) contains a miniature illustration of "Cundā of the Cundā temple of Paṭṭikerā" (in Tippera, Bangladesh).

In the Sādhanamālā, Cundā is considered to be affiliated with Vairocana Buddha and the Niṣpannayogāvalī states that she is the embodiment of the Cundādhāriṇī, a dharani also mentioned by Shantideva in his Śikṣāsamuccaya. In the Mañjuśrīmūlakalpa, she appears under the name Candrā (which generally means moon in Sanskrit). Images of the deity also appear in illustrated Prajñāpāramitā sutra manuscripts. Cundī and the Cundī Dhāraṇī are also featured in the Cundī Dhāraṇī Sūtra, which was translated three times from Sanskrit into Chinese in the late 7th century and early 8th century by the Indian esoteric masters Divākara (685 CE), Vajrabodhi (723 CE), and Amoghavajra (8th century).

The worship of this deity became popular in north India during the Pāla Empire, where she was taken as a patron deity of the Pāla dynasty. According to the Tibetan historian Tārānātha, the founder of the dynasty, Gopala I, was a devotee of Cundā. The deity spread throughout the Buddhist world to the rest of India, Sri Lanka, Southeast Asia and the Himalayan regions, also becoming popular in East Asia. During the 8th century, various texts related to the deity were translated into Chinese.

Another important Buddhist textual source of Cundī and the Cundī Dhāraṇī is the Kāraṇḍavyūhasūtra, a sūtra centered around the bodhisattva Avalokiteśvara that introduced the popular mantra Oṃ maṇi padme hūṃ. This text is first dated to around the late 4th century CE to the early 5th century CE. This text may be the reason the deity later came to be identified with Guanyin. In the Kāraṇḍavyūha, her mantra appears after Oṃ maṇi padme hūṃ is pronounced. Seventy million Buddhas appear and recite the Cundī Dhāraṇī. Gimello writes that the sutra "relates an occasion on which seventy-seven krore of tathagatas recited the Cundī Dhāraṇī, thereby causing a pore in Avalokitesvara's body to open and reveal in brilliant illumination a vast multitude of world systems (T. 1050: 20.63a)".

=== Iconography ===
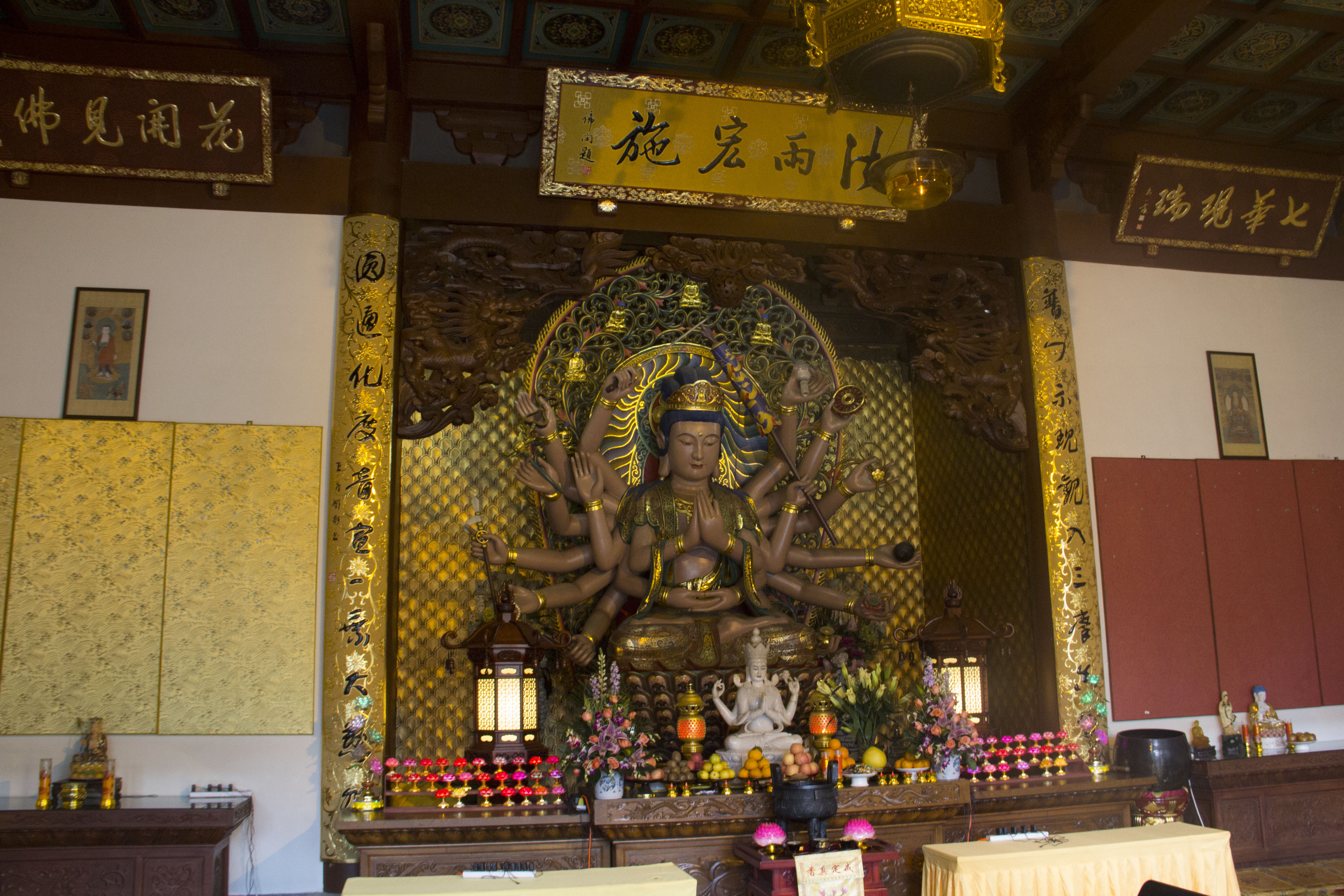
Shrine and statue of the eighteen-armed Zhunti Guanyin from the Mahavira Hall of Lingyin Temple in Hangzhou, Zhejiang, China

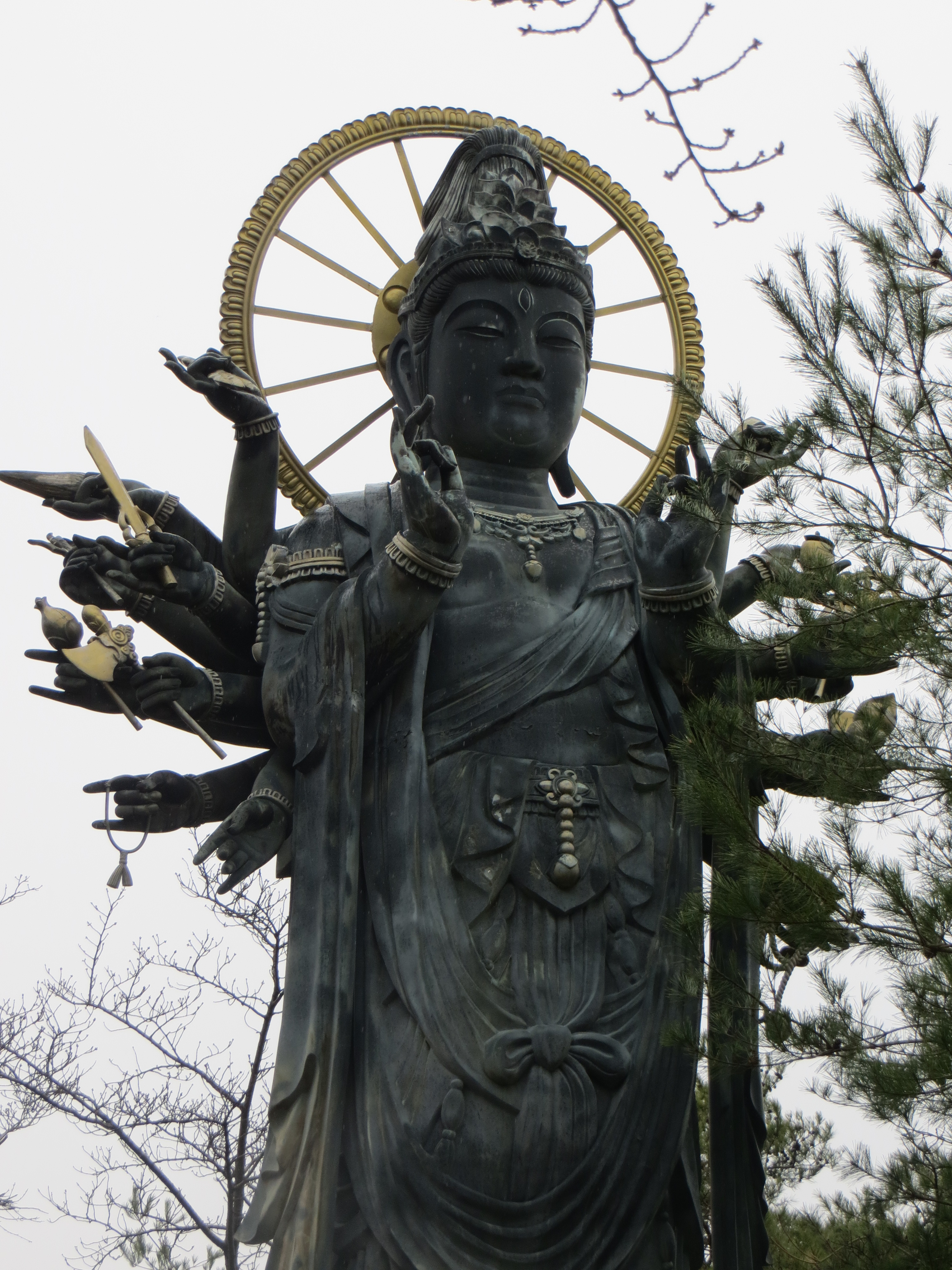
Statue of the eighteen-armed Juntei Kannon at Shichihou-ji in Nose, Osaka, Japan

Cundī is usually depicted with multiple arms. A common form of Cundī found in East Asia has eighteen arms, each wielding implements that symbolize skillful means. Her eighteen arms also represent the eighteen merits of attaining Buddhahood, as described in an appendix to the Cundī Dhāraṇī Sūtra. There are forms of Cundī with four, six, sixteen or twenty-six arms. The four arms of the four-armed form of Cundī symbolize the four immeasurables: loving-kindness or benevolence (maitrī), compassion (karuṇā), empathetic joy (muditā), and equanimity (upekṣā).

In the Sādhanamālā, she is described as follows:

She is of the colour of the autumn moon, and is four-armed. She shows the varada-mudrā in the right hand and holds the book on a lotus in the left. The two other hands hold the bowl. She is decked in all ornaments.

Abhayākaragupta's Niṣpannayogāvalī describes the deity in the mañjuvajra-maṇḍala as follows:

Cundā is moon-white in colour. She has twenty-six arms. With the two principal hands she exhibits the chief mudrā. In the remaining right hands she shows the 1. abhaya-mudrā, 2. sword, 3. garland of jewels, 4. citron, 5. arrow, 6. axe, 7. club, 8. hammer, 9. goad, 10. thunderbolt, 11. tripatākā and 12. rosary. In the remaining left hands she shows the 1. flag marked with cintāmaṇi jewel, 2. lotus, 3. Kamaṇḍalu, 4. noose, 5. bow, 6. javelin, 7. discus, 8. sword, 9. tarjaṇī (raised index finger), 10. bowl, 11. bhiṇḍipāla and 12. the prajñāpāramitā Scripture.

A three-faced, twenty-six armed Cundā form exists in the Rinjung Gyatsa, a collection of deities from all four classes of tantra, compiled in the sixteenth century by the Tibetan master Lama Taranatha. In many images of Cundā, her arms hold numerous symbolic objects or make Buddhist hand gestures - mudras. Important mudras which are often depicted in images of Cundā include the dharmachakra mudra (which symbolizes turning the dharmawheel), the varada mudra (symbolizes granting fulfillment) and the abhaya mudra (fearlessness). Regarding the symbols that she holds, Puspa Niyogi writes:

Among the objects held, the lotus is a symbol of purity; the book held by Cundā is Cundādhāriṇī, the rosary is for counting the number of repetitions of the mantra; the cakra is the symbol of absolute completeness; dhvaja is the banner of victory; the trisula is held to symbolize "the sun with a flame" but there is much diversity of opinion regarding it; the sword is the symbol of the emptiness which constitutes the core of the doctrine of perfect wisdom. The begging-bowl typifies renunciation of all possessions.

=== Hinduism ===
In Hindu texts, a deity also called Cundā is considered a vindictive form of the goddess Durgā, or Pārvatī, wife of the god Śiva. However, as Gimello notes "the often repeated claim that she is the Buddhist form of the Saivite deity Durgā invites suspicion, except insofar as both goddesses are examples of the general growth of devotion to female and maternal deities so rife throughout medieval India."

== In East Asian Buddhism ==
=== Chinese history ===
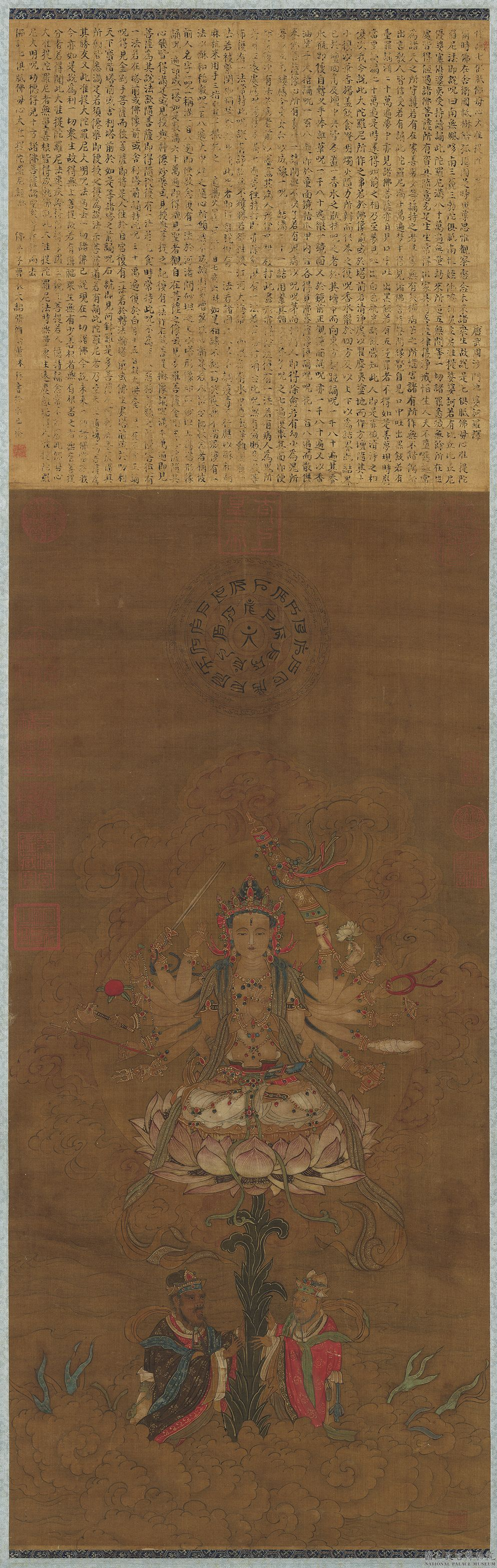
Hanging scroll depicting the eighteen-armed form of Zhunti Guanyin, China, Song dynasty (960–1279)

According to Robert Gimello, Cundī "came to be a, if not the, central focus of esoteric Buddhist practice in late traditional Chinese Buddhism. She is still a significant presence in Chinese Buddhism today." In China she became known as Zhǔntí Fómǔ (Chinese: 準提佛母, "Buddha-Mother Zhunti"). She is also called Zhǔntí Púsà (Chinese: 準提菩薩, "Cundi Bodhisattva").

She was introduced into China in the 8th century when the Cundīdevīdhāraṇīsūtra was translated by Divakara (Dipoheluo, 613–688). Zanning (919–1001) mentions that Vajrabodhi (who also translated a version of the Cundīdevīdhāraṇīsūtra) conducted a Cundī ritual for the Tang emperor Xuanzong (r. 712–736) to help end a long drought, a rite which was deemed to be successful. Amoghavajra translated another version of the sutra, Cundīdevīdhāraṇīsūtra (Qi Juzhi Fomu Suo Shuo Zhun Ti Tuoluoni Jing) which is significantly larger. Various related ritual manuals (like the Seven Koti Buddha Devi Cundi Heart Dharani Ritual and the Seven Koti Devi Ritual, are attributed to Śubhakarasiṃha).

Further sources were translated during the Song dynasty which augmented the Chinese cult of Cundī and her status as an esoteric deity including Kāraṇḍavyūha sūtra, the Māyājāla tantra, and the Cundī (Cundā) tantra.

In the 11th century Buddhism of the Liao dynasty (916–1125), Chinese Cundī practice developed into its most well known form (which remains influential today). This was led by the work of Daoshen who wrote the Collection of Essentials for the Attainment of Buddhahood by Total [Inter-]Penetration of the Esoteric and the Exoteric,. Daoshen's work linked Chinese Esoteric Buddhism, especially Cundī esotericism, with Huayan philosophy. According to Gimello, Daoshen's work is the foundation of what is today known as Chinese "Cundī Esotericism".

Cundī Esotericism continued to be practiced in China after the Liao. During the 17th century (in the late Ming and early Qing dynasty), there was another period of growth of Cundī Esotericism, especially in southern China. During this era, at least six works on Cundī practice were composed. These six texts are today part of the addendum to the Jiaxing Canon as well as in the Supplement to the [Kyoto] Buddhist Canon. Further sources from this period also contain many references to Cundī. There are also many paintings and images of the goddess from this period. Many of the figures associated with the late Ming Buddhist revival, such as Yunqi Zhuhong (1532–1612), Hanshan Deqing (1546–1623), and Ouyi Zhixu (1599–1655), were very engaged with Cundī practice.

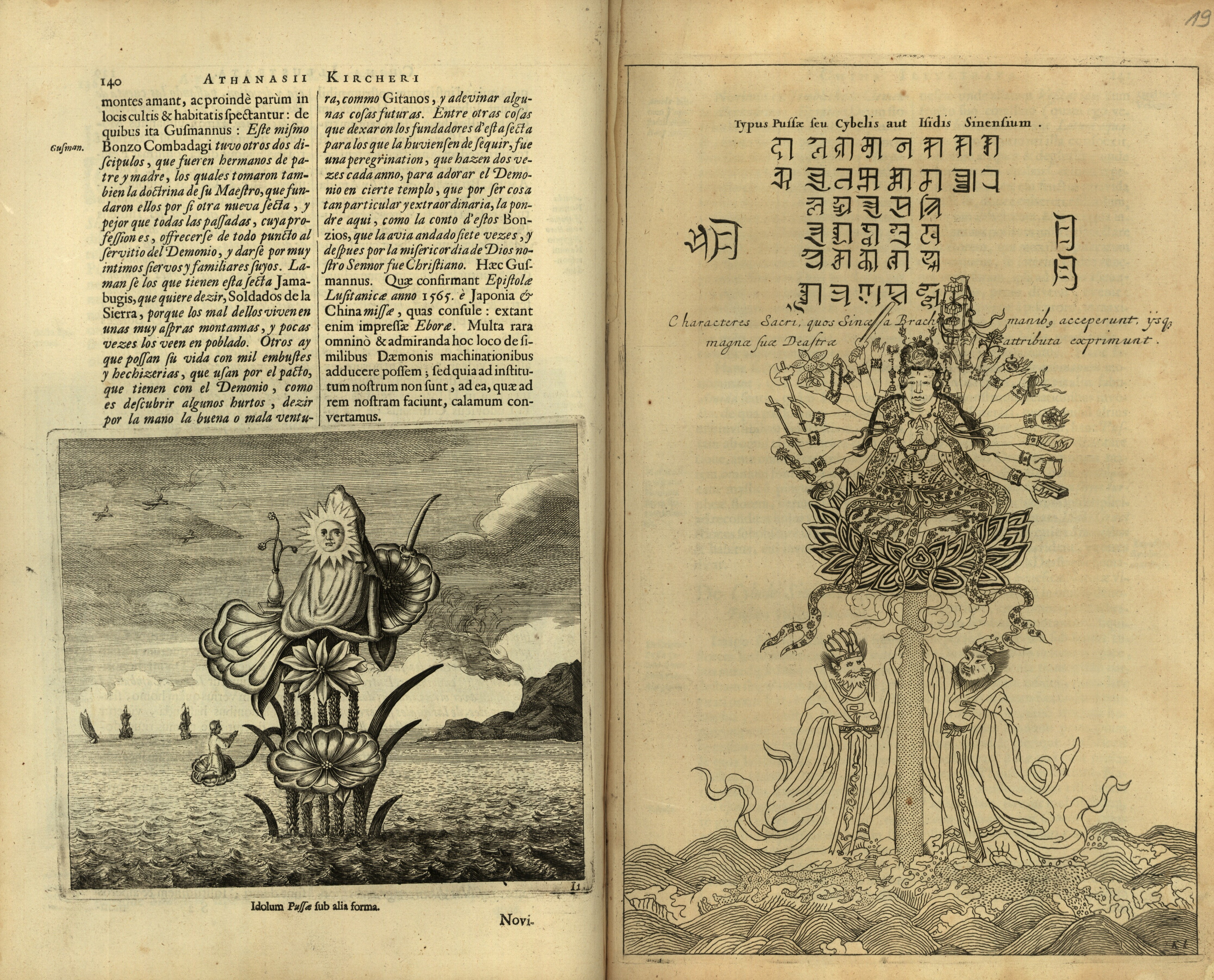
Reproduction of a Ming Zhunti image, China Illustrata (1667)

The slightly later figure Shoudeng (1607–1675) was also important in promoting Cundī Esotericism. He wrote the popular guide to practice titled Method for the Practice of Zhunti Meditation (Zhunti sanmei xingfa 准提三昧行法).

Cundī Esotericism was also widely practiced by Chinese Buddhist laypersons during the Ming. In P'eng Chi-ch'ing's (1740–1796) biography of lay Buddhists, the most popular mantras among laypersons were the Cundī mantra and the Great Compassion Mantra. She is also prominent in the art of the late Ming, such as in the paintings of Chen Hongshou (1598–1652). The popularity of Cundī Esotericism among the laypeople in the late Ming is also attested by German Jesuit Athanasius Kircher (1602–1680) who included an illustration of the deity in his famous China Illustrata (1667).

=== Current status ===
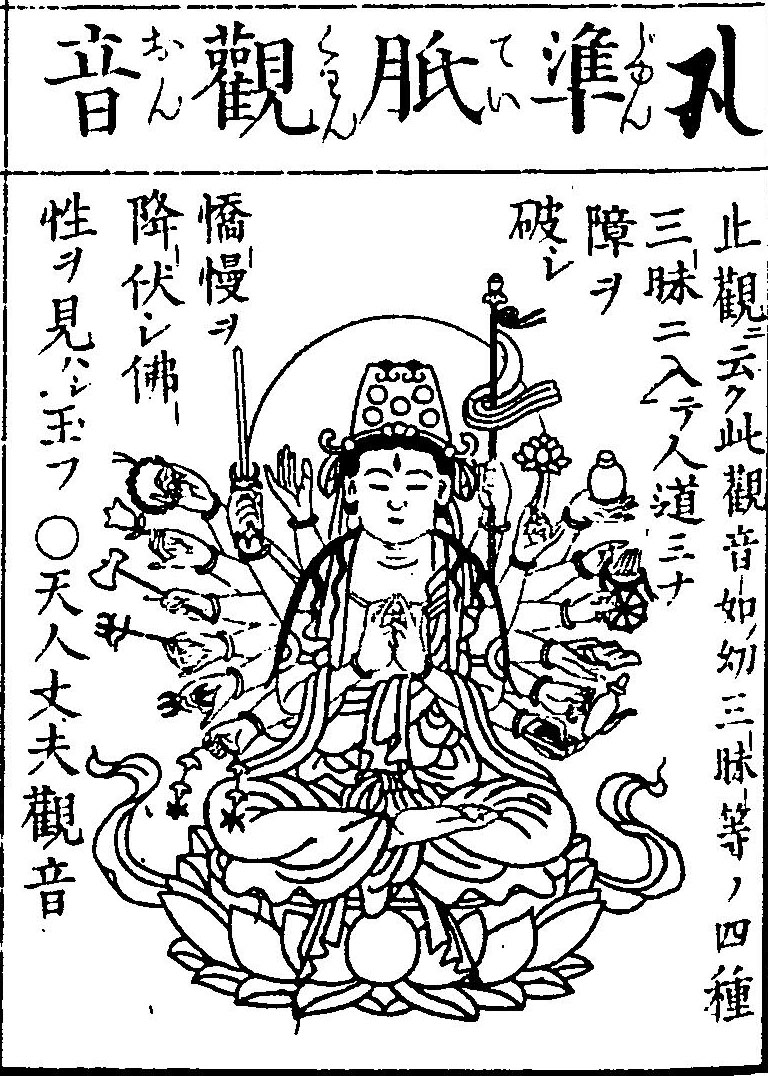
Japanese depiction of the deity

Cundī is still widely revered in East Asian Buddhism. She is also sometimes considered a manifestation of Guanyin and in this form she is called Zhǔntí Guānyīn (Chinese: 準提觀音, "Cundi Avalokiteśvara"). She is known as Junje Gwan-eum Bosal (준제관음보살, Hanja: 准提觀音菩薩, "Cundi Avalokiteśvara Bodhisattva") in Korean, while in Japan she is known as Jundei Kannon (准胝観音, "Cundi Avalokiteśvara") and in Vietnam she is known as Chuẩn Đề Quan Âm (Chữ Hán: 準提觀音, "Cundi Avalokiteśvara").

Cundī remains especially popular in China, where Cundī practices were promoted by some modern Chinese Buddhist figures, like Nan Huai-Chin. In Chinese Buddhist temples in Southeast Asia, statues of Cundī are traditionally enshrined in vegetarian halls (齋堂; zhaitang). In modern Chinese Buddhism, she is also sometimes identified with Marīci or the Queen of Heaven. Her mantra is used by contemporary Chinese healers and is also a central practice in numerous Chinese Buddhist rituals such as the Yujia Yankou rite.

== Cundī Dhāraṇī ==
According to the Cundī Dhāraṇī Sūtra, the dhāraṇī (incantation, spell) associated with Cundī is the following (in Sanskrit, English, Chinese):

- Namaḥ saptānāṃ samyaksaṃbuddha koṭīnāṃ tadyathā Oṁ cale cule cunde svāhā
- The homage by seven times ten million samyaksaṃbuddhas is like this: Oṁ cale cule cunde svāhā
- 南無 颯哆喃 三藐三菩陀 俱胝喃 怛姪他 唵 折隸 主隸 准提 娑婆訶

Nan Huaijin's version adds Om Bhrūm (Ong Bu Lin) to the end of the dhāraṇī.

According to Gimello, "in some later texts, the longer version is routinely framed by certain preliminary and concluding dharani uttered for purificatory and protective purposes." One example is:

Om raṃ om jrīṃ oṃ maṇī padme huṃ

Namaḥ saptānāṃ samyaksaṃbuddha koṭīnāṃ tadyathā:

Oṁ cale cule cunde svāhā

vrāṃ

=== Practice ===
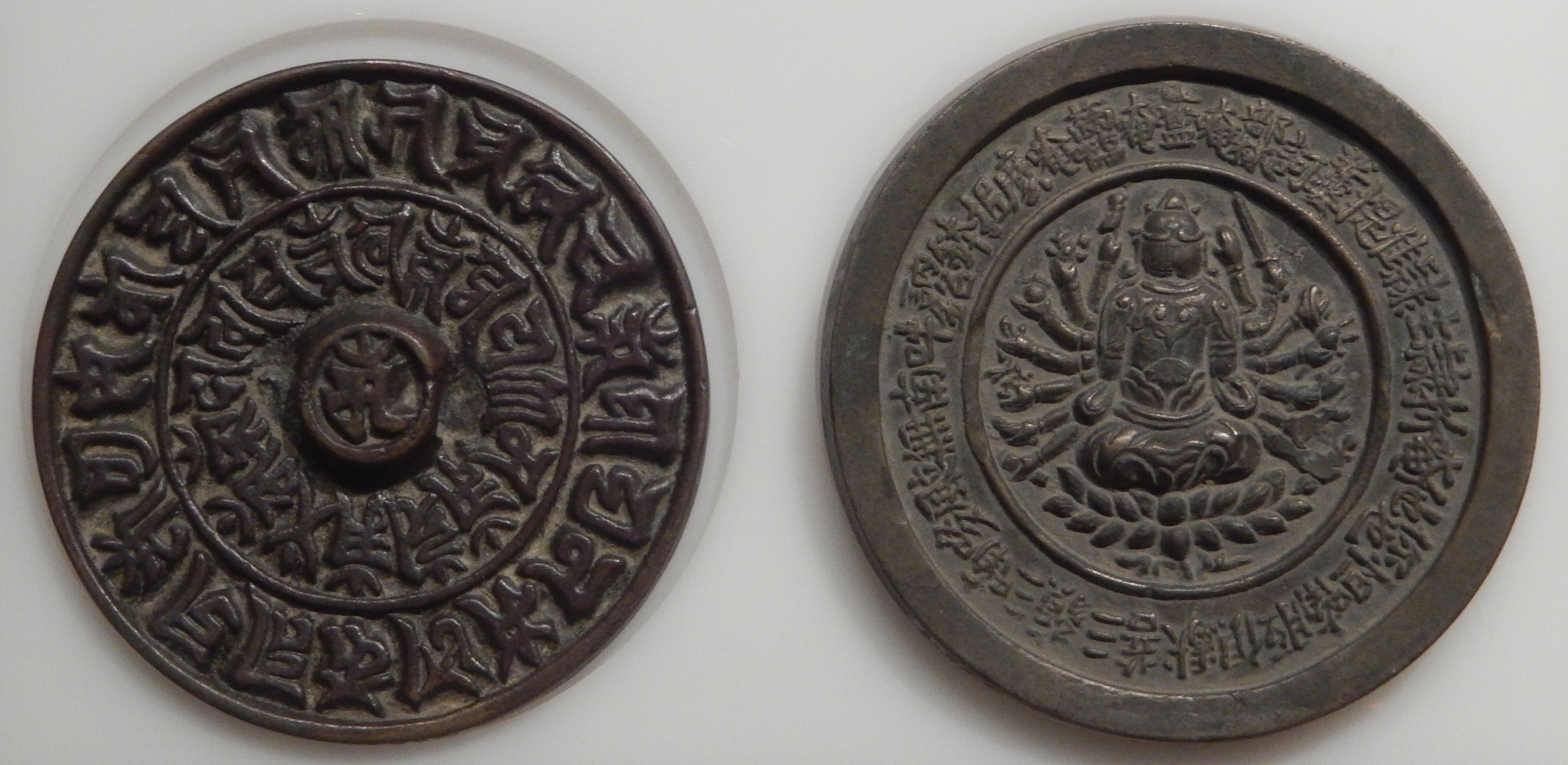
The backs of a pair of bronze mirrors showing Cundi, one with a Sanskrit inscription in Ranjana script, and one with a Sanskrit inscription in Chinese script. Yuan dynasty (1271–1368). Held at the Capital Museum, Beijing.

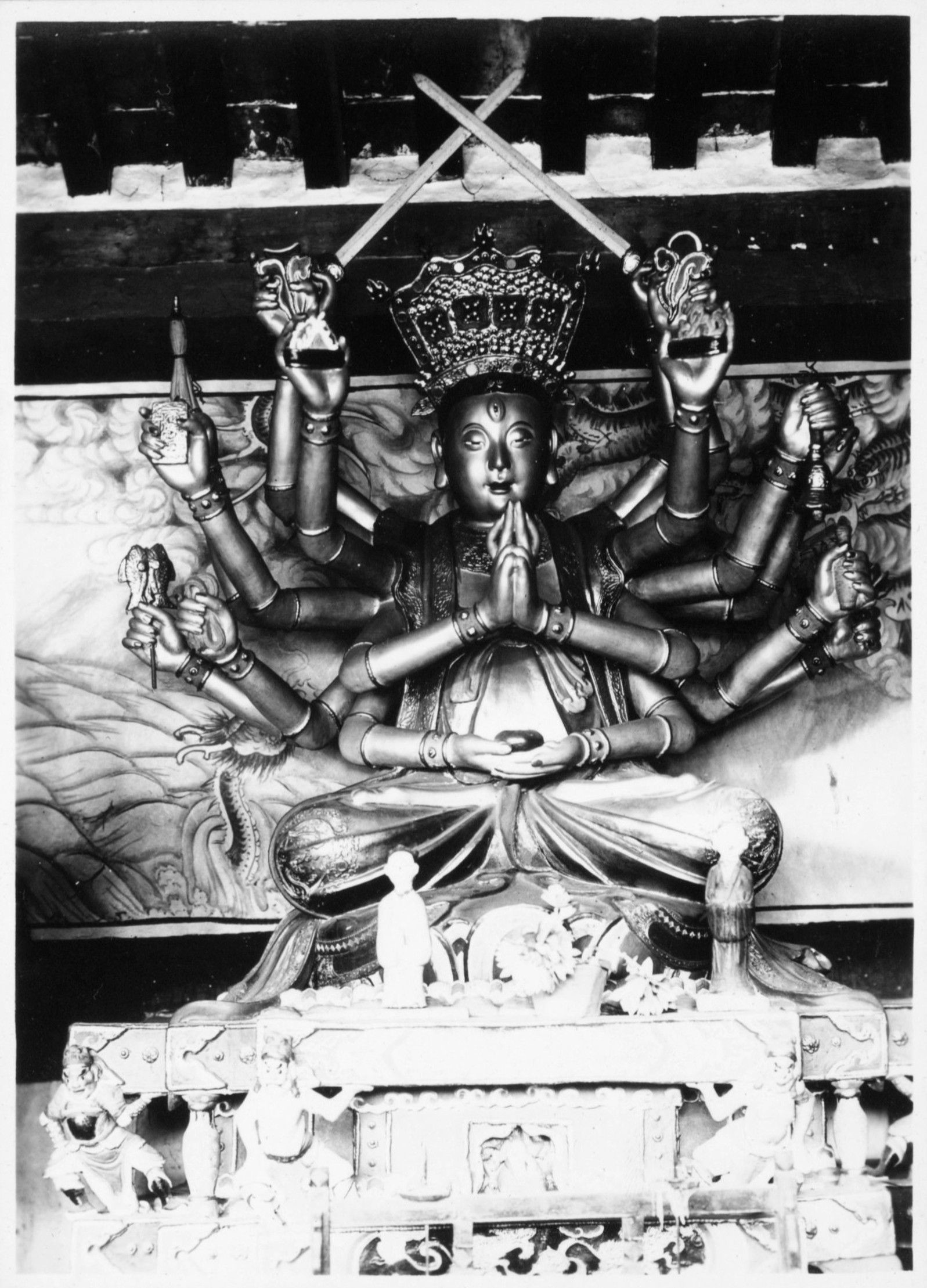
Chinese Zhunti statue shown making the Zhunti esoteric mudra

Robert Gimello describes an element of the practice of the Cundī Dhāraṇī as follows:

It is a defining feature of Zhunti practice, beginning with the Tang translation of the Cundī Dhāraṇī scriptures, that devotees are encouraged to use a mirror – "as an altar" (wei tan), some of the texts say – to facilitate visualization. Gazing into a mirror while reciting the dhāraṇī, one is to visualize both the image of the deity and the mystic letters that embody her. In time, the small disc-shaped bronze mirrors used for this purpose came to be commonly imprinted, on the back, with the deity's iconic form, according to the canonical description, and, on the front and/or the back, with the inscribed dhāraṇī. It was not unusual to have the Sanskrit version of the spell embossed on the outer edge of the front or reflecting side of the disc, and to have the transliterated Chinese version embossed on the circumference of the back. The effect is of an image of the goddess encircled by "garlands" of sacred syllables, as though to reinforce the claim that the goddess and the incantation were inseparable, perhaps even mutually constitutive. And, of course, as the instrument in question is a mirror, the fusion of goddess and spell is further fused with the practitioner's own reflection. Sometimes, to emphasize the theme of communion between devotee and deity, the goddess's image is imprinted on the back of the mirror, facing backwards, so that someone viewing the rear of the mirror would see the back of the goddess and could therefore easily imagine, when gazing at his or her own image in the front of the mirror, that it was the goddess herself, in the guise of one's own visage, who is gazing back.

The visualization of the icon and the recitation of the mantra are also coupled with the formation of a specific Cundī mudra. These three elements (mirror mandala, dharani and mudra) make up the practice of the "three mysteries" (sanmi), a key element of Chinese Esoteric Buddhism.

According to Gimello, the Chinese Cundi practitioner Daoshen held that by invoking the deity Cundi through esoteric ritual and reciting the mantra one could also attain the truth of the Huayan teaching. Gimello writes that Daoshen held that "the "body" of Huayan doctrine and the envisaged image of Cundi are somehow co-inherent, and that by invoking the presence of the goddess we somehow confirm the truth of the doctrines and render them practically efficacious". As such he "urges upon his readers a kind of religious synesthesia in which hearing or reading doctrine, as distilled in dharani, and seeing a deity – the apprehension of the word and the apprehension of the image – entail and merge with each other."

=== Benefits ===
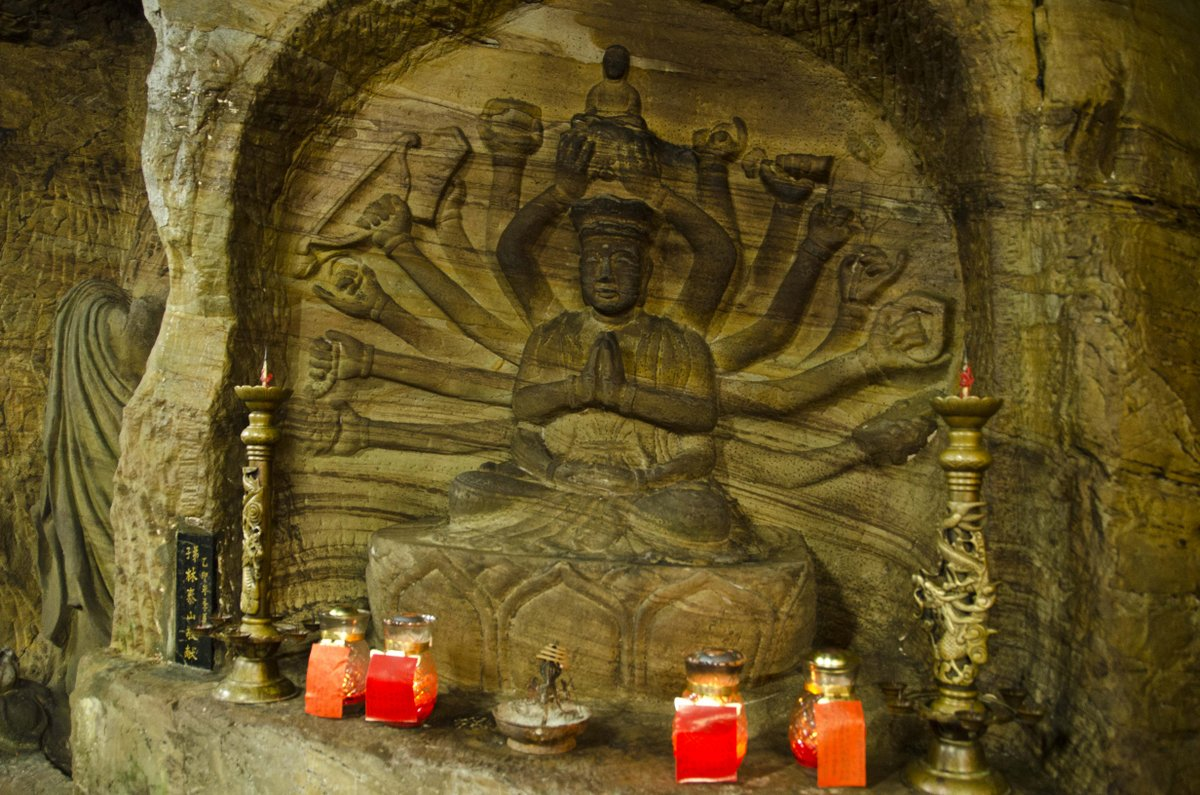
Cundī carving at Xian Dong Yan (仙洞巖), Taiwan

In the sūtra, the Buddha speaks extensively about the various effects and benefits of reciting the Cundī dhāraṇī. Many of the effects are purifying and uplifting in nature. For example, after pronouncing the dhāraṇī, the Buddha then says:

If there are bhikṣus, bhikṣuṇīs, upāsakas, or upāsikās who memorize and recite this dhāraṇī 800,000 times, their deadly karma in every place, created over innumerable eons, will be completely annihilated. In every place where they are born or reside, they will always meet Buddhas and bodhisattvas. They will always have adequate resources and abilities to do as they wish. In any birth, they will always be able to leave the home life, and will have the ability to maintain the pure precepts of a bodhisattva. They will be born in human or heavenly realms, they will not fall into evil destinies, and they will always be protected by all the heavenly guardians.

The dhāraṇī is also closely associated with buddhahood and complete enlightenment (Skt. Anuttarā Samyaksaṃbodhi). At the end of the sūtra, the Buddha closes the teaching by saying:

Moreover, this great dhāraṇī of Cundī is a great brilliant mantra teaching that is spoken by all buddhas of the past, all buddhas of the future, and all buddhas of the present time. I also now speak it thusly to benefit all sentient beings, causing them to attain Anuttarā Samyaksaṃbodhi. If there are sentient beings with little merit, who lack good roots, natural ability, and the Factors of Bodhi, if they obtain hearing of this dhāraṇī method, they will quickly realize the attainment of Anuttarā Samyaksaṃbodhi. If there are people who are always able to remember, recite, and maintain this dhāraṇī, they will all obtain immeasurable good roots.

== See also ==
- Huayan
- Pure Land Buddhism
- Chandi
