= Kāraṇḍavyūha Sūtra =

Sutra in Mahāyāna Buddhism

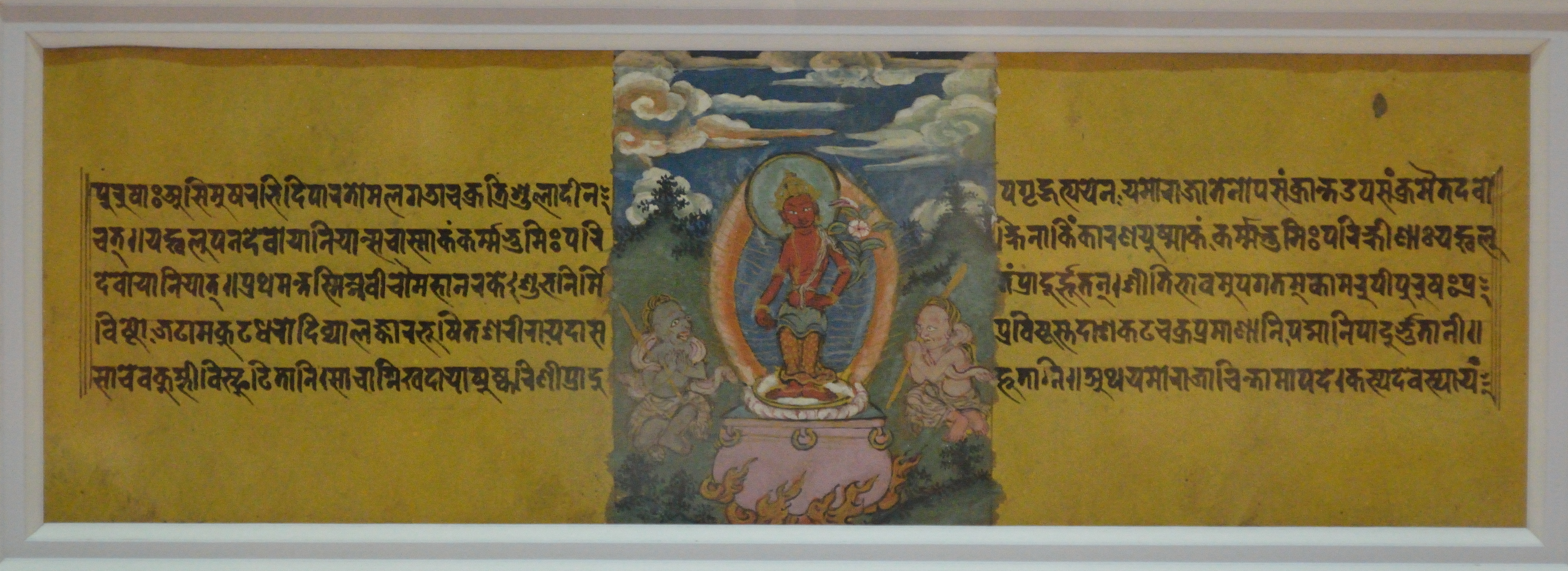
Folio from a Kāraṇḍavyūha Sūtra Manuscript, ca 14th Century CE

The Kāraṇḍavyūha Sūtra ("The Basket's Display", Full Sanskrit: Āryakāraṇḍavyūhanāmamahāyānasūtra, Tibetan: ['phags pa] za ma tog bkod pa zhes bya ba theg pa chen po'i mdo; Chinese: 佛說大乘莊嚴寶王經; pinyin: Fó shuō dàchéng zhuāngyán bǎo wáng jīng; Jyutping: fat6 syut3 daai6 sing4 zong1 jim4 bou2 wong4 ging1) is a Mantrayāna sūtra which extols the virtues and powers of Avalokiteśvara, who is presented here as a primordial cosmic overlord (a kind of adibuddha figure) and as the source of numerous Indian deities.

The Kāraṇḍavyūha was compiled at the end of the 4th century or beginning of the 5th century CE. It exists in Chinese translation (at Taishō Tripiṭaka no. 1050) and in Tibetan (Tohoku no. 116). This sutra is particularly notable for introducing the mantra Om mani padme hum and also teaching the important Cundi dharani.

== Overview ==
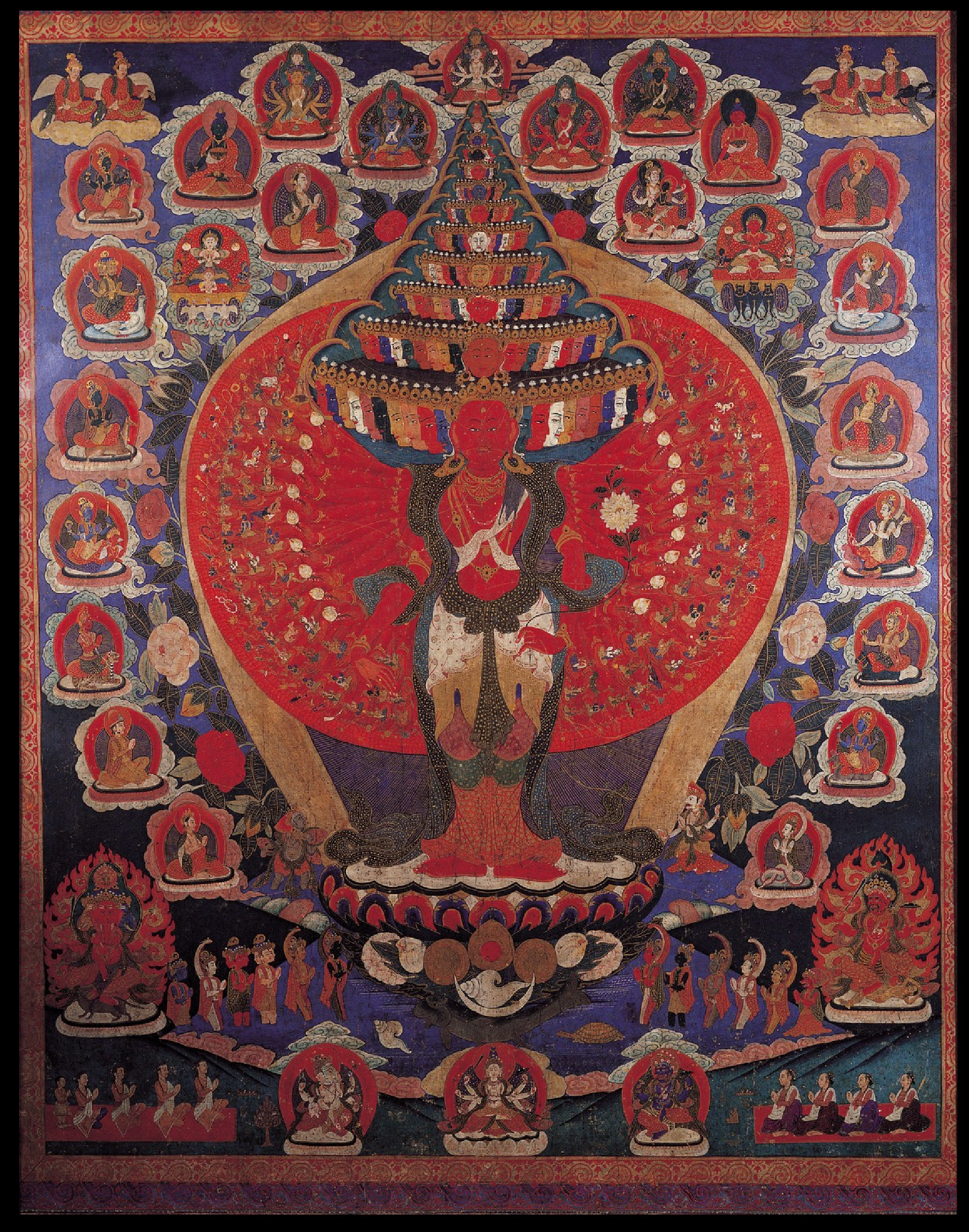
Shristhikantha Lokeśvara, 18th century painting in Nepal.

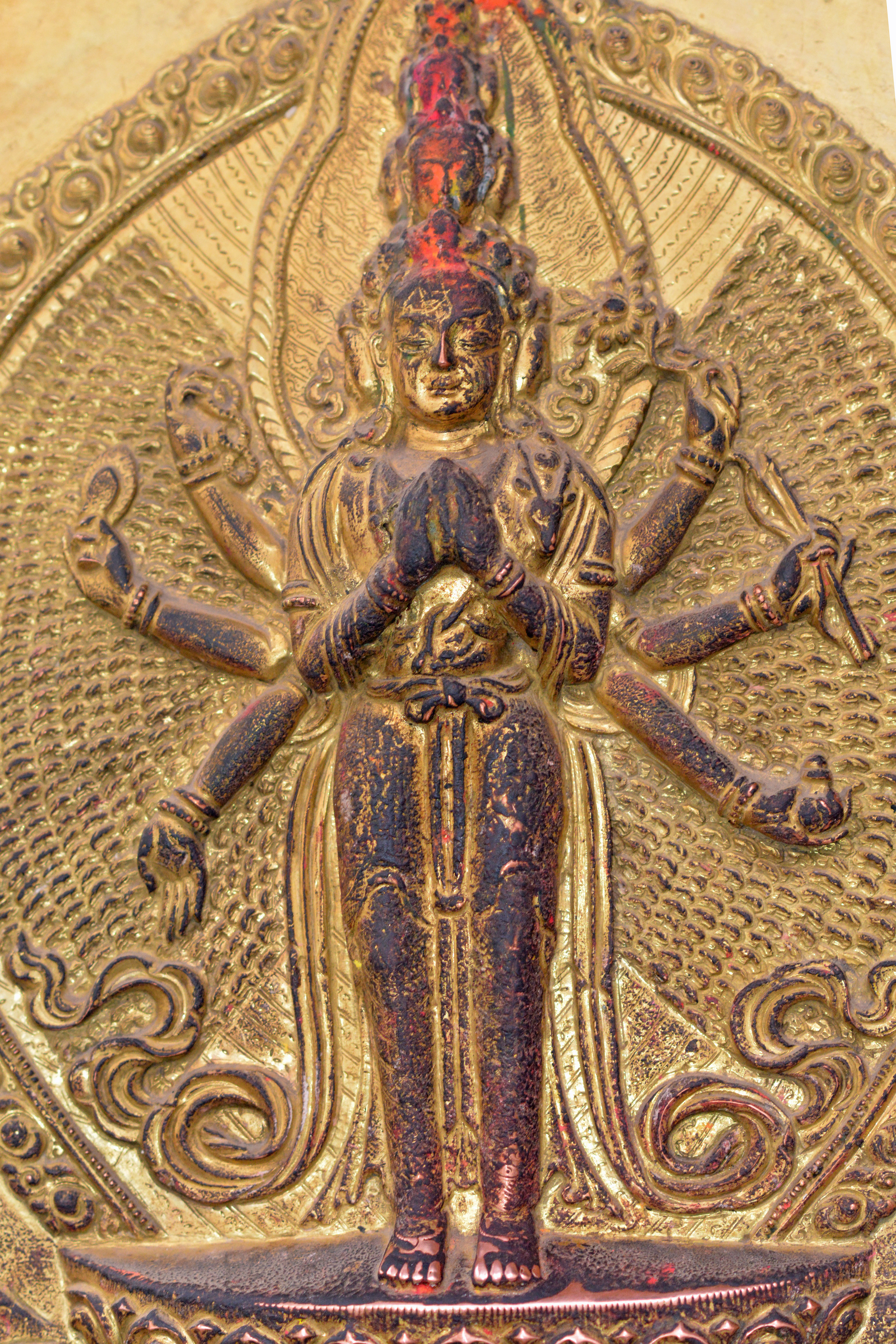
Sahasrabhuja Lokeśvara on the facade of the Janabahā temple, Keltole, Kathmandu.

Alexander Studholme writes that the Kāraṇḍavyūha Sūtra presents the great bodhisattva Avalokiteśvara (Lokeśvara) as a kind of supreme lord of the cosmos and as the progenitor of various heavenly bodies and divinities (such as the Sun and Moon, the deities Shiva and Vishnu, etc.).

According to the Kāraṇḍavyūha Sūtra, many Indic deities were born from Avalokiteśvara bodhisattva's body, such as:

- Surya (the Sun) and Chandra (Moon) are said to be born from Avalokiteśvara's eyes
- Maheśvara from his brow
- Brahma from his shoulders
- Narayana from his heart
- Mahalakshmi from his knee
- Saraswati from his teeth,
- Vayu (Wind) from his mouth
- Varuna (Water) from his stomach
- Bhudevi (Earth) from his feet

Avalokiteśvara himself is linked in the versified version of the sutra to the first Buddha, the Adi-Buddha, who is 'svayambhu' (self-existent, not born from anything or anyone). Studholme comments:

Avalokitesvara himself, the verse sutra adds, is an emanation of the Adibuddha, or 'primordial Buddha', a term that is explicitly said to be synonymous with Svayambhu and Adinatha, 'primordial lord'.

=== Mantras ===
The sutra introduces the Buddhist mantra, Om Mani padme Hum, which it states can lead to liberation (moksha) and eventual Buddhahood. In the sutra, Shakyamuni Buddha states, "This is the most beneficial mantra. Even I made this aspiration to all the million Buddhas and subsequently received this teaching from Buddha Amitabha."

Alexander Studholme sees this famous mantra as being a declarative aspiration, possibly meaning 'I in the jewel-lotus', with the jewel-lotus being a reference to birth in the lotus made of jewels in the Buddhist Eternal Paradise or Pure land 'Sukhavati' of Buddha Amitabha. The mantra is the very heart of Avalokiteśvara (the supreme Buddha of Compassion) and can usher in Awakening. A. Studholme writes:

Om Manipadme Hum, then, is both the paramahrdaya, or 'innermost heart', of Avalokiteśvara ... It is also ... a mahavidya, a mantra capable of bringing about the 'great knowledge' of enlightenment itself ...

The Kāraṇḍavyūhasūtra also sees the mantra as the pith or condensed expression of all "eighty four thousand Dharmas". Because of this it is called "the grain of rice of the Mahayana", and reciting it is equivalent to reciting numerous sutras.

After presenting the Mani mantra, the Kāraṇḍavyūha Sūtra also presents the dhāraṇī of Cundī, which occurs towards the end of the sūtra. This occurs as Seventy million Buddhas appear and recite Cundī Dhāraṇī which is: namaḥ saptānāṃ samyaksaṃbuddha koṭīnāṃ tadyathā, oṃ cale cule cunde svāhā. This event causes "a pore in Avalokitesvara’s body to open and reveal in brilliant illumination a vast multitude of world systems (T. 1050: 20.63a)" according to Gimello.

=== Mandala ===
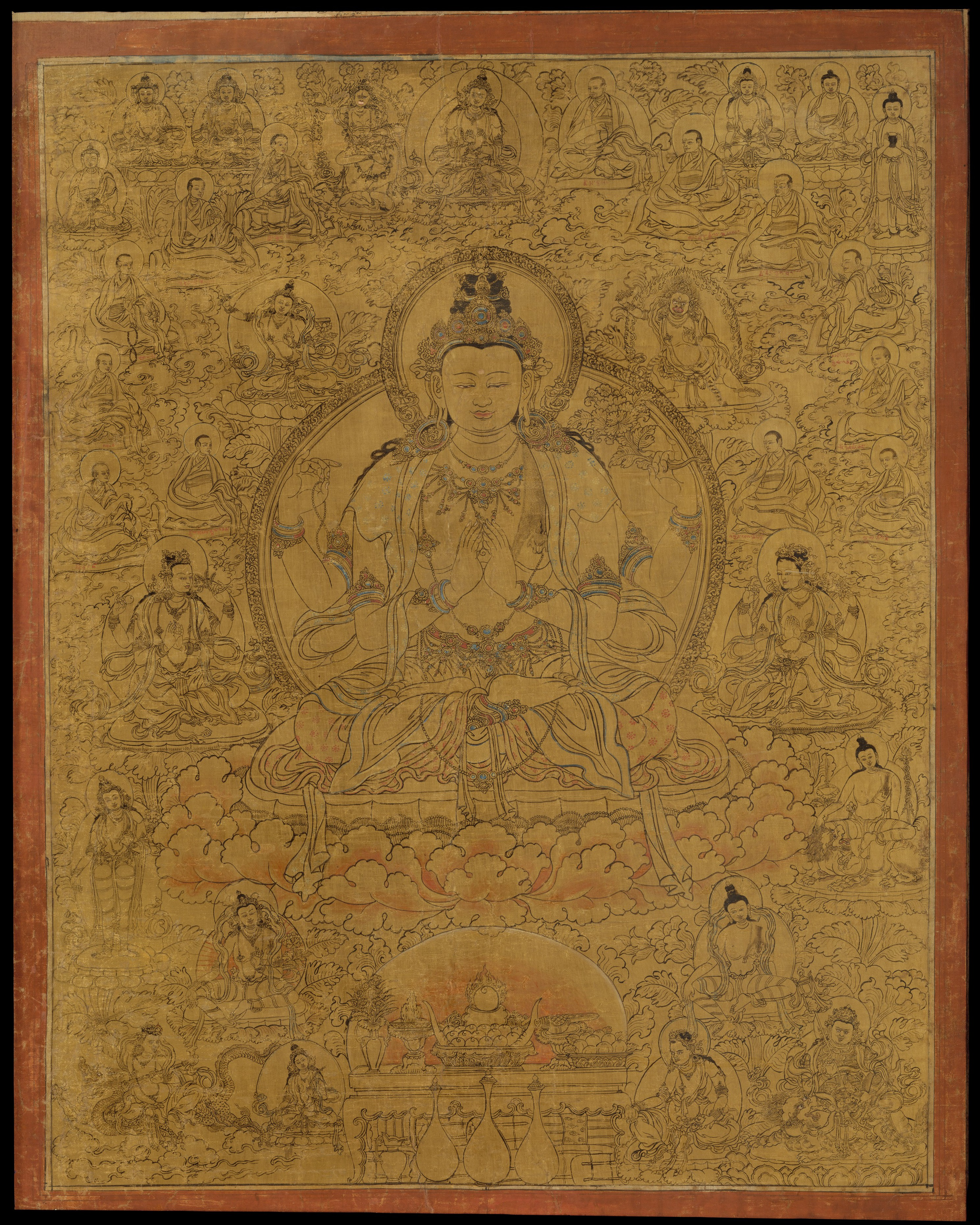
Ṣaḍakṣarī mandala, Avalokiteśvara in the center flanked by Mahāmaṇidhara and Ṣaḍakṣarī Mahāvidyā.

The sutra also describes a specific maṇḍala (the ṣaḍakṣarī mạḍala, mandala of the six syllable one) with Amitābha Buddha at the center, a bodhisattva named Mahāmaṇidhara on his right and the goddess Ṣaḍakṣarī Mahāvidyā on his left:

It should be square with a circumference of five cubits. Draw Amitābha in the centre of the maṇḍala. To create the body of Tathāgata Amitābha, sprinkle powder made from precious sapphire powder, emerald powder, ruby powder, crystal powder, and powdered silver and gold. On his right create Bodhisattva Mahāmaṇidhara. On his left draw Ṣaḍakṣarī Mahāvidyā, who has four arms and is white like the autumn moon. She is adorned with various adornments and holds a lotus in her left hand. Draw a jewel upon that lotus. Draw a jewel rosary in her left hand. Portray the palms of two hands being placed together in the gesture named the lord-of-all-kings. Draw a vidyādhara beneath the legs of Ṣaḍakṣarī Mahāvidyā. Draw him holding a smoking stick of incense in his right hand and a basket filled with various adornments in his left hand. Draw the four mahārājas at the four doors of the maṇḍala. Draw them holding their individual offerings. Place vases filled with various precious jewels at the four corners of the maṇḍala.

This ṣaḍakṣarī mạṇḍala has also been found in other sources like the Sādhanamālā and in a stele found by Indian archeologists. In the Sādhanamālā and in this stele, Avalokiteśvara is at the center of the mandala instead of Amitabha, and he is flanked by Maṇidhara bodhisattva and Ṣaḍakṣarī Mahāvidyā.

=== Influence ===
According to a Tibetan legendary tradition, the text of Kāraṇḍavyūhasūtra arrived in a casket from the sky unto the roof of the palace of the 28th king of Tibet, Lha Thothori Nyantsen, who died in the fifth century C.E., in southern Tibet. This coincides with one version of dating of the Kāraṇḍavyūhasūtra, somewhere in the 4th or perhaps early 5th century, however it seems more likely that the sutra has originated in Kashmir, due to closeness to characteristics to Kasmiri tantric traditions of the time and to Avataṁsakasūtra earlier associated with the Central Asian regions.

The Kāraṇḍavyūhasūtra was also an influential text on Chinese Esoteric Buddhism, which makes use of both the Mani mantra and the Cundi dharani.

== Translations ==
- Tibetan. The Kāraṇḍavyūha Sūtra was first translated into Tibetan as the Za ma tog bkod pa in the 8th century CE by Jinamitra, Yeshe De (or Jnanasutra) and others.
- Chinese. The text was translated by the monk Tianxizai (Chinese: 天息災, pinyin: Tiānxīzāi, Sanskrit: Devasantika) into Chinese in 983 CE during the Song dynasty.
- French. The Sutra has been translated from the Sanskrit into French by Eugène Burnouf (1801-1852) : Eugène Burnouf (1801-1852) et les études indo-iranologiques, actes de la Journée d'étude d'Urville (28 mai 2022) suivis des Lalitavistara (chap. 1-2) et Kāraṇḍavyūha traduits par E. Burnouf, édités par Guillaume Ducoeur, Université de Strasbourg, 2022.
- English. The Sutra has been translated from the Tibetan into English by Peter Alan Roberts with the help of Tulku Yeshi, in 2013.

== See also ==
- God in Buddhism
- Lotus Sutra (Chapter 25: "The Universal Gateway of Avalokiteśvara Bodhisattva")
- Om mani padme hum

== General and cited references ==
- Buswell, Robert Jr; Lopez, Donald S. Jr., eds. (2013). Princeton Dictionary of Buddhism. Princeton, NJ: Princeton University Press. pp. 418–419. ISBN 9780691157863.
- Roberts, Peter Alan (2012). "Translating Translation: An Encounter with the Ninth-Century Tibetan Version of the Kārandavyūha-sūtra", Journal of the Oxford Centre for Buddhist Studies 3, 224-242
