= Om mani padme hum =

Buddhist mantra

Chinese name
- Chinese: 唵嘛呢叭咪吽
Transcriptions
Standard Mandarin
- Hanyu Pinyin: Ōng mā nī bēi mēi hōng

Karandavyuha Sutra name
- Chinese: 唵麼抳缽訥銘吽
Transcriptions
Standard Mandarin
- Hanyu Pinyin: Ōng mó ní bō nè míng hōng

Tibetan name
- Tibetan: ཨོཾ་མ་ཎི་པདྨེ་ཧཱུྂ ཨོཾ་མ་ཎི་པད་མེ་ཧཱུྂ
Transcriptions
- Wylie: oM ma Ni pad+me hU~M` oM ma Ni pad me hU~M`
- Tibetan Pinyin: Om Mani Bêmê Hum

Vietnamese name
- Vietnamese: Úm ma ni bát ni hồng Án ma ni bát mê hồng

Thai name
- Thai: โอํ มณี ปัทเม หูํ

Korean name
- Hangul: 옴 마니 반메 훔 옴 마니 파드메 훔
Transcriptions
- Revised Romanization: Om mani banme hum Om mani padeume hum

Mongolian name
- Mongolian Cyrillic: Ум мани бадмэ хум
- Mongolian script: ᢀᠣᠸᠠ ᠮᠠᢏᢈ ᢒᠠᢑᠮᠧ ᢀᠾᠤᠤ
Transcriptions
- SASM/GNC: Owam mani padme huum

Japanese name
- Kana: オーム マニ パドメー フーム オム マニ ペメ フム
Transcriptions
- Romanization: Ōmu Mani Padomē Fūmu; Omu Mani Peme Fumu

Tamil name
- Tamil: ௐம் மணி பத்மே ஹூம்

Hindi name
- Hindi: ॐ मणि पद्मे हूँ

Sanskrit name
- Sanskrit: ॐ मणि पद्मे हूँ 𑖌𑖼𑖦𑖜𑖰𑖢𑖟𑖿𑖦𑖸𑖮𑖳𑖽

Russian name
- Russian: Ом мани падме хум

Bengali name
- Bengali: ওঁ মণি পদ্মে হূঁ

Assamese name
- Assamese: ওঁ মণি পদ্মে হূঁ

Nepali name
- Nepali: ॐ मणि पद्मे हूँ

Burmese name
- Burmese: ဥုံ မဏိ ပဒ္မေ ဟုံ
- IPA: [òʊɰ̃ ma nḭ paʔ mè hòʊɰ̃]

Malayalam name
- Malayalam: ഓം മണി പദ്മേ ഹും

Odia name
- Odia: ଓ‍ଁ ମଣି ପଦ୍ମେ ହୁଁ

Marathi name
- Marathi: ॐ मणि पद्मे हूँ

Punjabi name
- Punjabi: ੴ ਮਣਿ ਪਦਮੇ ਹੂੰ

Chakma name
- Chakma: 𑄃𑄮𑄀 𑄟𑄧𑄕𑄨 𑄛𑄧𑄘𑄳𑄟𑄬 𑄦𑄪𑄀

Khmer name
- Khmer: ឱំ មណិ បទ្មេ ហូំ

A Om mani padme hum hymn in Changhua, Taiwan

Oṃ maṇi padme hūm̐ (Sanskrit: ॐ मणि पद्मे हूँ, IPA: [õːː mɐɳɪ pɐdmeː ɦũː]) is the six-syllabled Sanskrit mantra particularly associated with the four-armed Shadakshari form of Avalokiteśvara, the Bodhisattva of compassion. It first appeared in the Mahayana Kāraṇḍavyūha sūtra, where it is also referred to as the sadaksara (Sanskrit: षडक्षर, six syllabled) and the paramahrdaya, or "innermost heart" of Avalokiteśvara. In this text, the mantra is seen as the condensed form of all Buddhist teachings.

The precise meaning and significance of the words remain much discussed by Buddhist scholars. The literal meaning in English has been expressed as "praise to the jewel in the lotus", or as a declarative aspiration, possibly meaning "I in the jewel-lotus". Padma is the Sanskrit for the Indian lotus (Nelumbo nucifera) and mani for "jewel", as in a type of spiritual "jewel" widely referred to in Buddhism. The first word, aum/om, is a sacred syllable in various Indian religions, and hum represents the spirit of enlightenment.

In Tibetan Buddhism, this is the most ubiquitous mantra and its recitation is a popular form of religious practice, performed by laypersons and monastics alike. It is also an ever-present feature of the landscape, commonly carved onto rocks, known as mani stones, painted into the sides of hills, or else it is written on prayer flags and prayer wheels.

The mantra is also popularly used in East Asian Buddhist traditions, where it is mainly associated with the Bodhisattva Guanyin, who is the East Asian manifestation of Avalokiteśvara. In Chinese Buddhism, the recitation of the mantra remains widely practiced by both monastics and laypeople, and it plays a key role as part of the standard liturgy utilized in many of the most common Chinese Buddhist rituals performed in monasteries. It is common for the Chinese hanzi transliteration of the mantra to be painted on walls and entrances in Chinese Buddhist temples, as well as stitched into the fabric of particular ritual adornments used in certain rituals. The mantra is also recited in the standard liturgies of temples belonging to the Vietnamese and Japanese Ōbaku Zen Buddhist traditions as well.

The mantra has also been adapted into Chinese Taoism.

== Meaning and effects ==
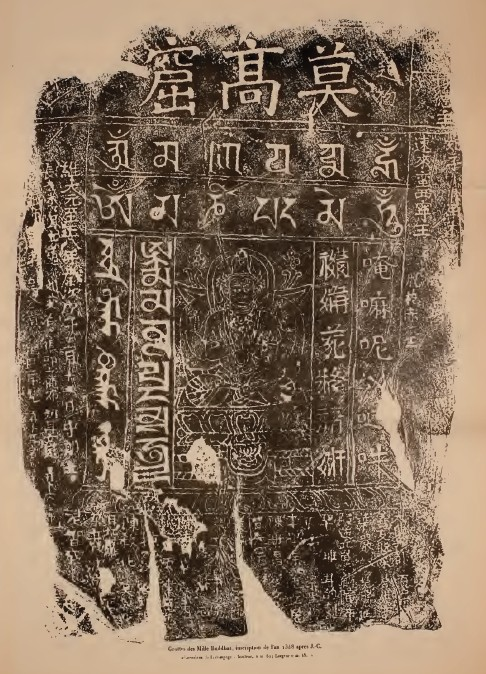
Stele of Sulaiman, erected at the Mogao Caves in 1348 to commemorate the donations of Sulaiman, Prince of Xining. It includes the six-syllable mantra written in six different scripts: Lantsa [1st row], Tibetan [2nd row], Uighur [far left], 'Phags-pa [left], Tangut [right], Chinese [far right].

=== Semantic ===
Mantras may be interpreted by practitioners in many ways, or even as mere sequences of sound whose effects lie beyond strict semantic meaning.

The middle part of the mantra, maṇi padme, is often interpreted as being in the locative case, "wish-fulfilling jewel in the lotus", Sanskrit maṇi "wish-fulfilling/priceless gem, jewel, cintamani" and the locative of padma "lotus". The lotus is a symbol present throughout Indian religion, signifying purity (due to its ability to emerge unstained from the mud) and spiritual fruition (and thus, awakening). Maṇipadme is preceded by the oṃ syllable and followed by the hūṃ syllable, both interjections without linguistic meaning, but widely known as divine sounds.

However, according to Donald Lopez (citing Tibetan grammatical sources) it is much more likely that maṇipadme is in fact a noun of address, addressing in the vocative case a Bodhisattva called maṇipadma, "jewel-lotus" – an alternative epithet of the Bodhisattva Avalokitesvara.

Damien Keown also notes that another theory about the meaning of the mantra is that it actually invokes a female deity named Manipadmi. This is due to evidence from texts such as the Kāraṇḍavyūhasūtra which depict the mantra as a female deity. Also, as noted by Studholme, if the word is read as a noun of address, it is most likely in the feminine grammatical gender, because if masculine, it would be a highly irregular form. Thus as Lopez notes, the original meaning of the mantra could in fact be an invocation of "she of the lotus jewel", who is the vidya (wisdom) and consort of Avalokiteshvara and is equivalent to Shakti's role vis a vis Shiva.

Regarding the relationship between the jewel and the lotus, Sten Konow argued that it could either refer to "a lotus that is a jewel" or to "a jewel in the lotus". He argues that the second explanation makes more sense, indicating Shaivite influence through the imagery of the lingam and the yoni, both also terms associated with mani and padma respectively. Thus the mantra could in fact mean "O, she with the jewel in her lotus".

According to Alexander Studholme however, the meaning of manipadme "should be parsed as a tatpurusa, or 'determinative', compound in the (masculine or neuter) locative case", meaning "in the jewel-lotus", or "in the lotus made of jewels", which refers to:

the manner in which buddhas and Bodhisattvas are said to be seated in these marvelous blooms and, in particular, to the manner in which more mundane beings are believed to appear in the pure land of the buddhas. Given the predominance, in the Kāraṇḍavyūha and in the Mahayana in general, of the religious goal of the pure land of Amitabha, it may be safely assumed that maṇipadme would have been quite naturally associated with the mode of the rebirth of human beings there. The recitation of Oṃ Maṇi Padme Hūṃ, then, the bringing to mind of the name of the Buddhist isvara, includes a declaration of the manner in which a person is reborn in Sukhavati: "in the jewel lotus."

=== According to the Kāraṇḍavyūhasūtra ===
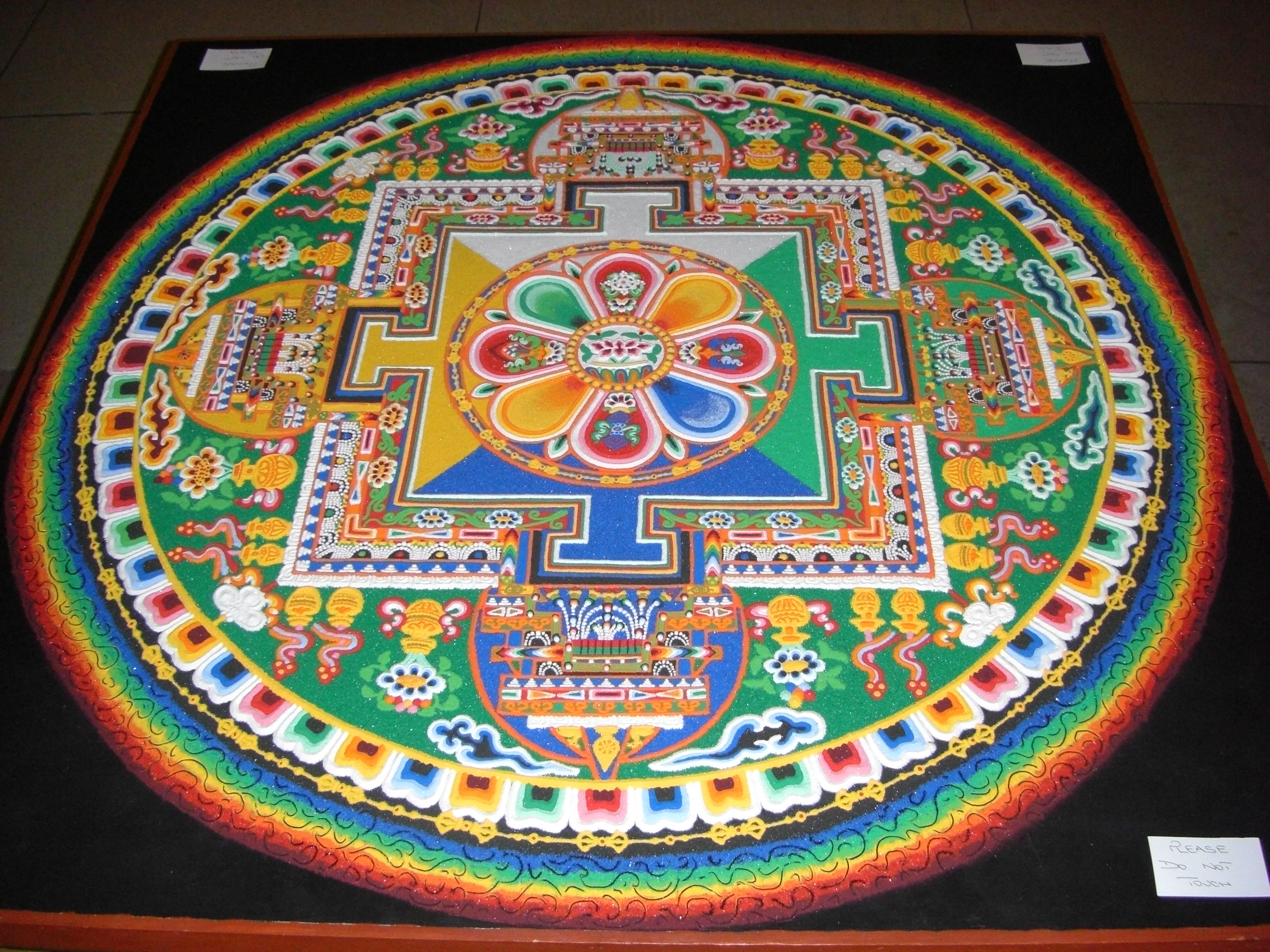
A Tibetan sand mandala of Avalokitesvara, a key element of the tantric initiation ritual required to practice the mantra according to the Kāraṇḍavyūha

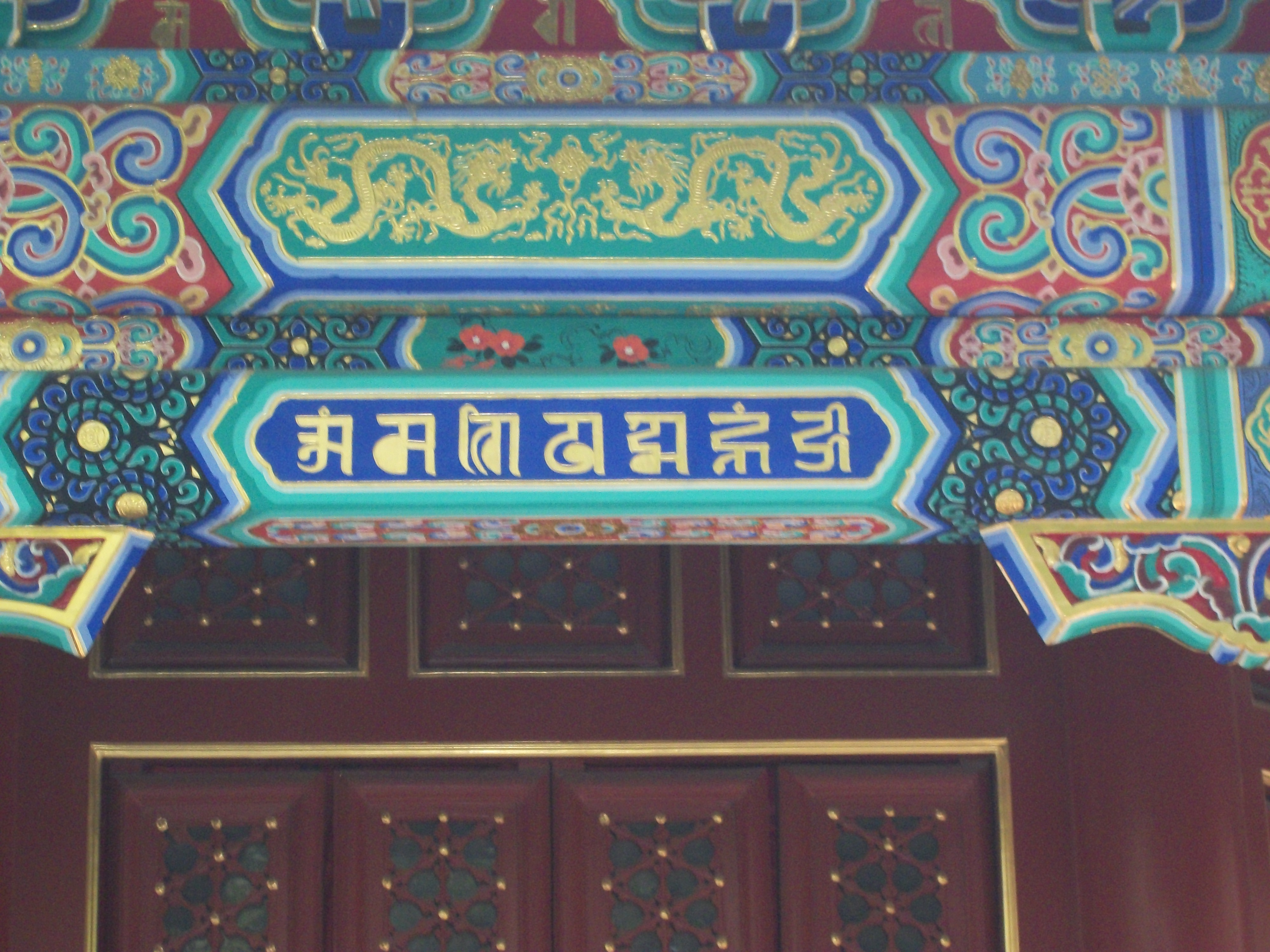
At Yonghe Temple, Beijing

In the Nepalese Lanydza script

The first known description of the mantra appears in the Kāraṇḍavyūha Sūtra ("The Basket's Display", c. 4–5th centuries), which is part of certain Mahayana canons such as Chinese and Tibetan. In this sutra, Shakyamuni Buddha states, "This is the most beneficial mantra. Even I made this aspiration to all the million Buddhas and subsequently received this teaching from Buddha Amitabha."

The sutra promotes the recitation of this mantra as a means to liberation. It states that whoever knows (janati) the mantra will know liberation as a fully enlightened Buddha. It also states that initiation into the mantra by a qualified preceptor (which is said to be a lay dharmabhāṇaka, vidyadhara or mahasiddha) is an important requirement for practicing this mantra. In the sutra, Avalokitesvara says that the mantra should not be given to one who has not seen the mandala. This initiation is said to be open to all Buddhists regardless of class and gender, whether they be of the Mahayana or Hinayana, but not to tirthikas.

The Kāraṇḍavyūhasūtra also sees the mantra as the pith or condensed expression of all "eighty four thousand Dharmas". Because of this it is called "the grain of rice of the Mahayana", and reciting it is equivalent to reciting numerous sutras.

Thus, according to Studholme, the significance of the mantra in the Kāraṇḍavyūha is mainly that it is the "innermost heart" of Avalokitesvara, and therefore is "a means both of entering into the presence of Avalokitesvara and of appropriating some of the Bodhisattva's power". Its practice is said to lead numerous positive qualities including:

- The seeing (darsana) the Bodhisattva's "thousand-fold" form,
- Rebirth into the myriad worlds contained in the pores of the Bodhisattva's body
- Innumerable samadhis (meditative absorptions), including the samadhi of "rejoicing in loving kindness and compassion" (maitri-karuna-mudito).
- The development of "great compassion" (maha karuna)
- Accumulation of immeasurable merit
- Accomplishment of the six perfections
- Awakening (bodhi)

In this sutra, the sadaksari mahavidya (six syllabled great vidya) also appears as a goddess, "autumn yellow" in color, with four arms, with two arms holding a lotus and prayer beads, and the other two in anjali mudra. According to Studholme, these features are similar to the way the mantra Om nama shivaya is depicted in Shaiva texts, since "both are concise vidyas, the hrdayas [heart] of their respective isvaras, sui generis means of attaining liberation, universally available, though of rare value and somewhat secret. Both are also, it has been argued, conceived of as forms of pranava [divine sound]."

=== In Tibetan Buddhism ===
The mantra in Tibetan script with the six syllables colored

"Om mani padme hūṃ hrīḥ"

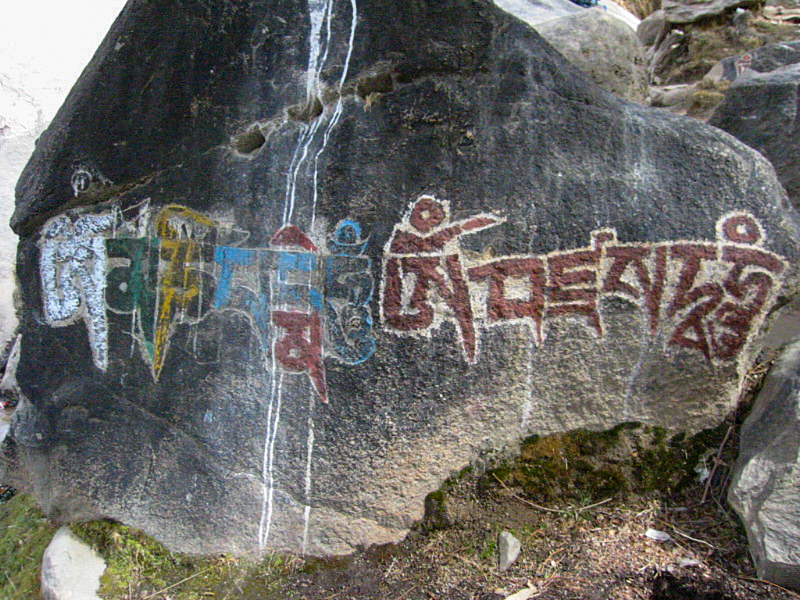
"Om mani padme hūṃ", mani stone carved in Tibetan script outside the Potala Palace in Lhasa

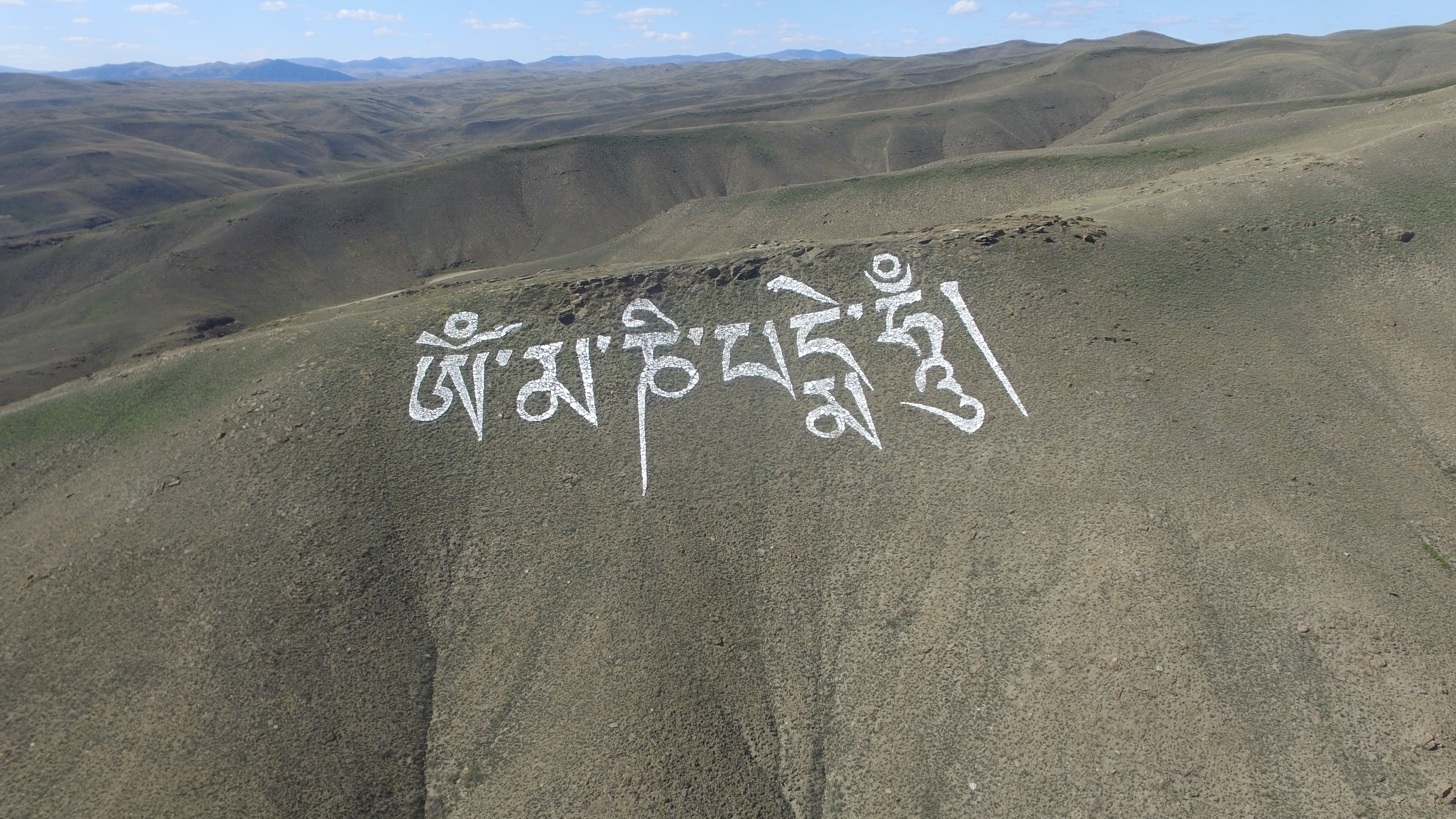
The largest mantra inscription in the world is located on Dogee Mountain in Kyzyl, Russia.

The 11th-century Bengali master Atiśa Dīpaṃkara Śrījñāna, who was influential in bringing Buddhism to Tibet, also wrote a short treatise on the mantra called the Arya-sad-aksari-sadhana. Some Buddhist scholars argue that the mantra as practiced in Tibetan Buddhism was based on the Sadhanamala, a collection of sadhana or spiritual practices published in the 12th century. However, according to Peter Alan Roberts, "the primary source for Tibetan Avalokitesvara practices and teachings" is the 11th-century Maṇi Kambum.

Donald Lopez writes that according to a 17th-century work by the prime minister of the fifth Dalai Lama, the meaning of the mantra is said to be "O, you who have the jewel and the lotus." That manipadme is a noun of address is also supported by a 9th-century Tibetan grammatical treatise.

Lopez also notes that the majority of Tibetan Buddhist texts have regarded the translation of the mantra as secondary, focusing instead on the correspondence of the six syllables of the mantra to various other groupings of six in the Buddhist tradition.

For example, in the Chenrezig Sadhana, Tsangsar Tulku Rinpoche expands upon the mantra's meaning, taking its six syllables to represent the purification of the six realms of existence:

Syllable	Six Pāramitās	Purifies	Samsaric realm	Colors	Symbol of the Deity	(Wish them) To be born in
Om	Generosity	Pride / Ego	Devas	White	Wisdom	Perfect Realm of Potala
Ma	Ethics	Jealousy / Lust for entertainment	Asuras	Green	Compassion	Perfect Realm of Potala
Ni	Patience	Passion / desire	Humans	Yellow	Body, speech, mind quality and activity	Dewachen
Pad	Diligence	Ignorance / prejudice	Animals	Blue	Equanimity	the presence of Protector (Chenrezig)
Me	Renunciation	Greed / possessiveness	Pretas (hungry ghosts)	Red	Bliss	Perfect Realm of Potala
Hum	Wisdom	Aggression / hatred	Naraka	Black	Quality of Compassion	the presence of the Lotus Throne (of Chenrezig)

==== According to Trijang Rinpoche ====
The tutor to the present Dalai Lama, Trijang Rinpoche (1901–1981) wrote a commentary on the mantra which states:

Regarding mani padme, "Jewel Lotus" or "Lotus Jewel" is one of the names of the noble Avalokitesvara. The reason that he is called by that is that, just as a lotus is not soiled by mud, so the noble Avalokitesvara himself has, through his great wisdom, abandoned the root of samsara, all the stains of the conception of true existence together with its latencies. Therefore, to symbolize that he does not abide in the extreme of mundane existence, he holds a white lotus in his hand...He joins the palms of his two upper hands, making the gesture of holding a jewel to symbolize that, like a wish-granting jewel, he eliminates all the oppression of suffering for all sentient beings and bestows upon them all temporary and ultimate benefit and bliss.

==== According to the 14th Dalai Lama ====
The 14th Dalai Lama Tenzin Gyatso states:

It is very good to recite the mantra Om mani padme hung, but while you are doing it, you should be thinking on its meaning, for the meaning of the six syllables is great and vast... The first, Om [...] symbolizes the practitioner's impure body, speech, and mind; it also symbolizes the pure exalted body, speech, and mind of a Buddha[...]

The path of the middle way is indicated by the next four syllables. Mani, meaning jewel, symbolizes the factors of method: (the) altruistic intention to become enlightened, compassion, and love.[...]

The two syllables, padme, meaning lotus, symbolize wisdom[...]

Purity must be achieved by an indivisible unity of method and wisdom, symbolized by the final syllable hung, which indicates indivisibility[...]

Thus the six syllables, om mani padme hung, mean that in dependence on the practice of a path which is an indivisible union of method and wisdom, you can transform your impure body, speech, and mind into the pure exalted body, speech, and mind of a Buddha[...]

— Tenzin Gyatso, 14th Dalai Lama, "On the meaning of: OM MANI PADME HUNG"

==== Dilgo Khyentse Rinpoche ====
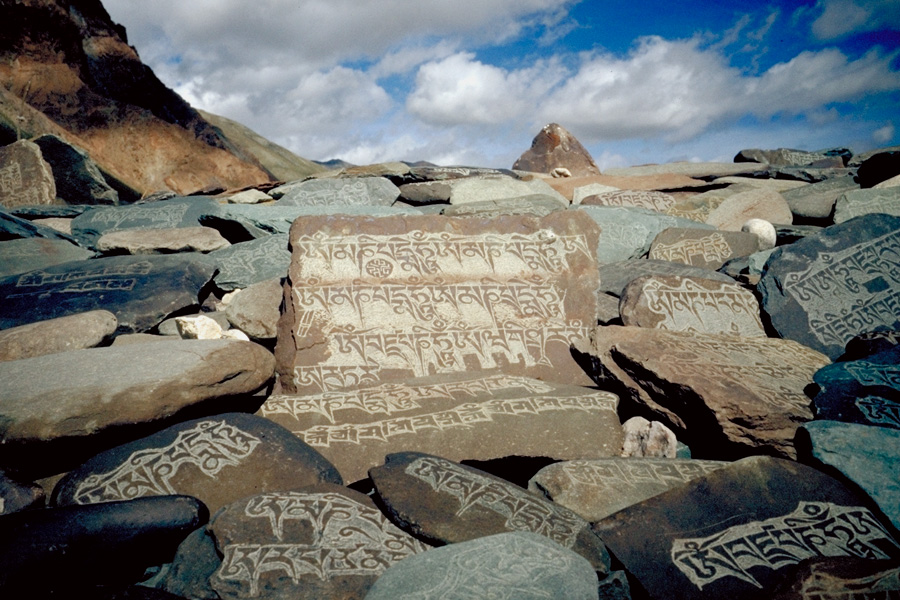
Carved mani stones, each with "Om Mani Padme Hum" on a pathway in Zangskar

The mantra Om Mani Pädme Hum is easy to say yet quite powerful, because it contains the essence of the entire teaching. When you say the first syllable Om it is blessed to help you achieve perfection in the practice of generosity, Ma helps perfect the practice of pure ethics, and Ni helps achieve perfection in the practice of tolerance and patience. Pä, the fourth syllable, helps to achieve perfection of perseverance, Me helps achieve perfection in the practice of concentration, and the final sixth syllable Hum helps achieve perfection in the practice of wisdom.

So in this way recitation of the mantra helps achieve perfection in the six practices from generosity to wisdom. The path of these six perfections is the path walked by all the Buddhas of the three times. What could then be more meaningful than to say the mantra and accomplish the six perfections?

— Dilgo Khyentse Rinpoche, Heart Treasure of the Enlightened Ones

=== In East Asian Buddhism ===
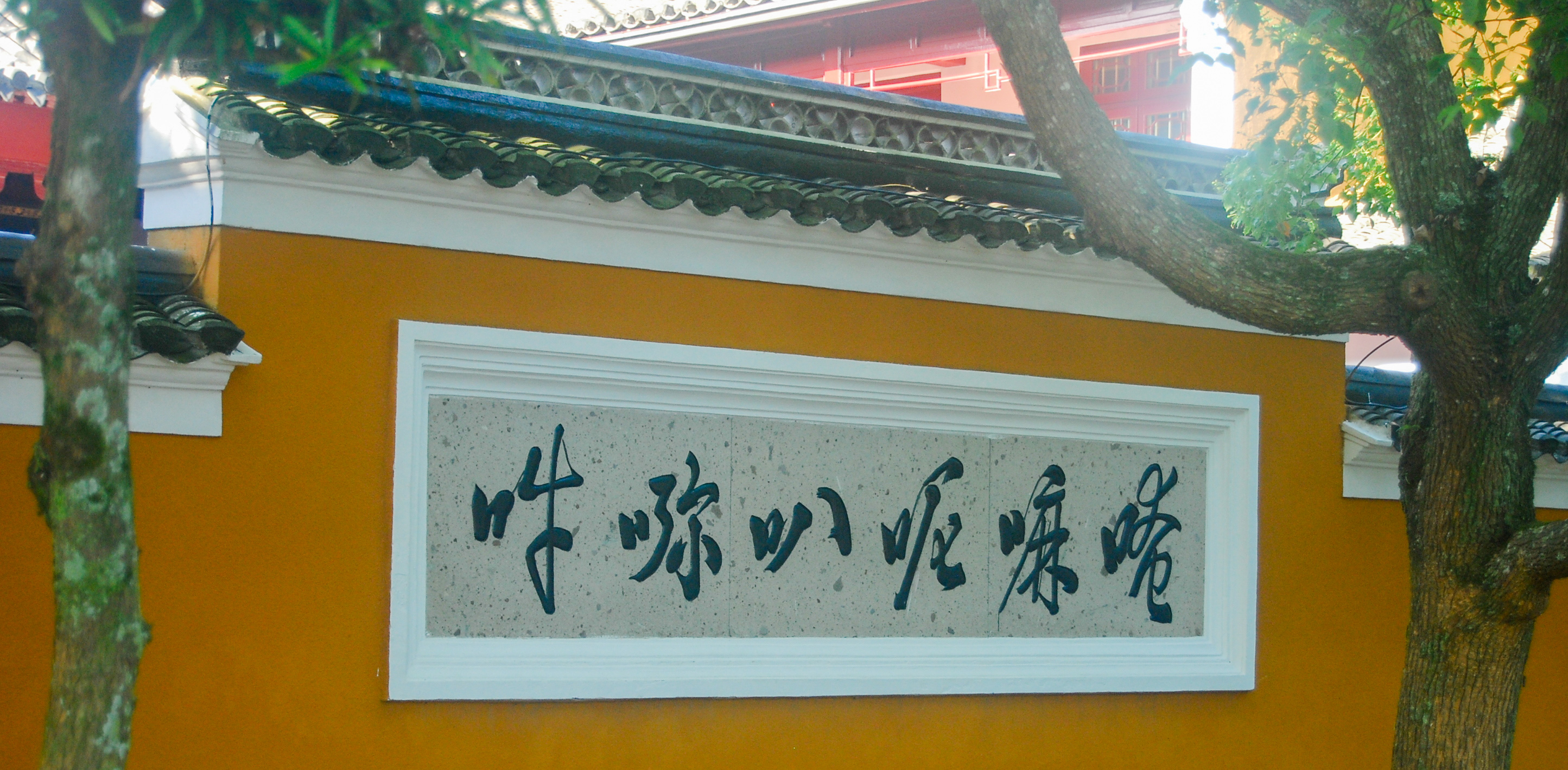
Hanzi transliteration of the mantra (read from right to left), painted on a Chinese Buddhist temple on Mount Putuo, which is regarded in Chinese Buddhist tradition as the bodhimaṇḍa of Guanyin (Avalokiteśvara).

The mantra was first introduced into Chinese Buddhism during the Song dynasty (960 - 1279) in 983 CE when the Kāraṇḍavyūha Sūtra was first translated into Chinese by the monk Tianxizai^{[zh]} (Chinese: 天息災, pinyin: Tiānxīzāi, Sanskrit: Devasantika). The mantra's popularity further heightened during subsequent Chinese dynasties due to increased interactions between Chinese Buddhists and Tibetan and Mongolians Buddhists.

Illustration with both Chinese and Tangut transliterations of the mantra from the Pearl in the Palm, a 12th-century bilingual glossary between both languages.

The mantra remains ubiquitous and widely employed in contemporary Chinese Buddhist liturgies and practices, such as the esoteric Yujia Yankou rite, where it is recited up to 108 times during a subsection where the ritual space is visualized, as well as being incorporated into the Āryavalokiteśvarā Bodhisattva Vikurvana Dhāraṇī (Chinese: 觀音靈感真言, Pinyin: Guānyīn Línggǎn Zhēnyán), which is one of the Ten Small Mantras that are still recited every morning as part of the standard daily liturgy at most modern Chinese, Vietnamese as well as Japanese Ōbaku Zen Buddhist temples.

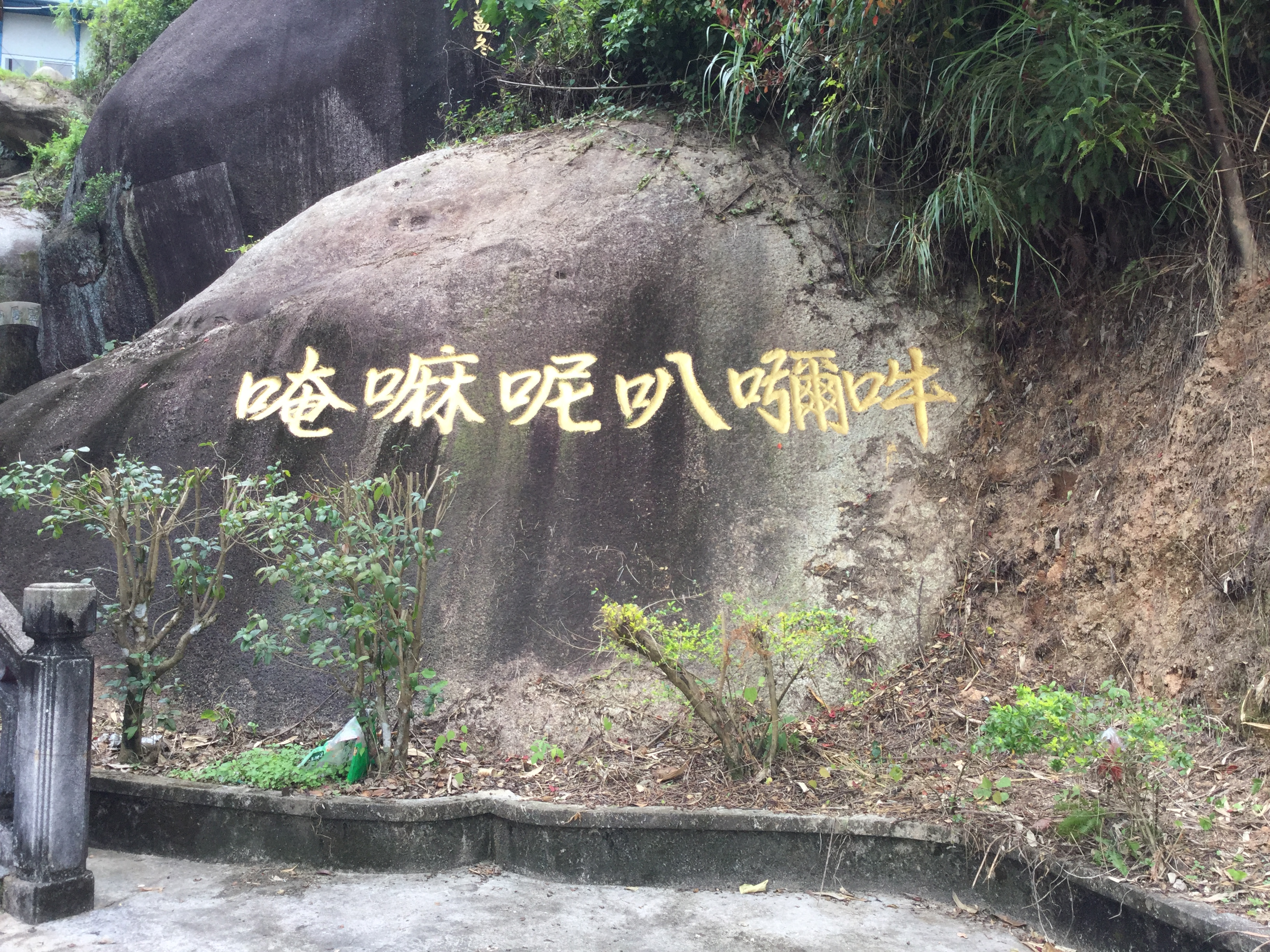
Hanzi transliteration of the mantra (read from left to right), painted on a rock at Feifeng Temple in Guangdong, China.

Various prominent monastics, such as the Chan Master Hsuan Hua (who was one of the first monks to transmit Chan Buddhism in the west) and Venerable Chin Kung (who was an influential Pure Land teacher), have also delivered lectures and teachings on the meaning of the mantra. For instance, according to Hsuan Hua:

The first word is "Om". When you recite "Om" once, all ghosts and spirits must place their palms together because this signifies their intent to maintain the rules and regulations. By conforming to the regulations, they stay on the proper way. Recite this once and all ghosts and spirits do not dare rebel and create confusion; they do not dare disobey orders. This is the first sound in the mantra.

"Mani" means "silent wisdom". Using wisdom one is able to understand all truths, and thus abide in the state of quiescence that is without birth. It is also defined as, "separating from filth", which means living a morally pure life free of defilement. It can be compared to the "precious as-you-will pearl" which is extremely pure and immaculate. Whatever you wish to excel in can be done if you have the "precious as-you-will pearl". It can also fulfill your wishes in accord with your thoughts. Every vow you make will be fulfilled. These are its benefits.

"Padme" means "light perfectly illuminating", and is also defined as "the opening of the lotus". This is the wonderful mind of Avalokiteshvara Bodhisattva. This is "Padme".

Next comes "Hum", which means to "give rise to". Anything at all can be created from this character "Hum". It also means "to protect and support". Recite this word and all Dharma protectors and good spirits come to support and protect you. It also means "eradicating disasters". Recite this word and whatever difficulties you encounter will be eradicated. It also means "success"; whatever you cultivate can be accomplished.

Recite the Brilliant Mantra of Six Words once, and the immeasurable Buddhas, Bodhisattvas, and Vajra Dharma protectors support and protect you. Therefore, when Avalokiteshvara Bodhisattva finished saying this Brilliant Mantra of Six Words, there were seven million Buddhas who came to support, protect, and surround him. The power and capacity of the Brilliant Mantra of Six Words are inconceivable; "the Path and the response intertwine in an inconceivable way." Therefore it is called the Secret School. If one were to explain in detail, the meanings would be limitless and boundless. They cannot be completely spoken. So I have just given this simple explanation for everyone.

— From a lecture by Hsuan Hua, Vajra Bodhi Sea, Issue No. 11, February (Translated by Bhiksu Heng Ch'ien)

=== In Taoism ===
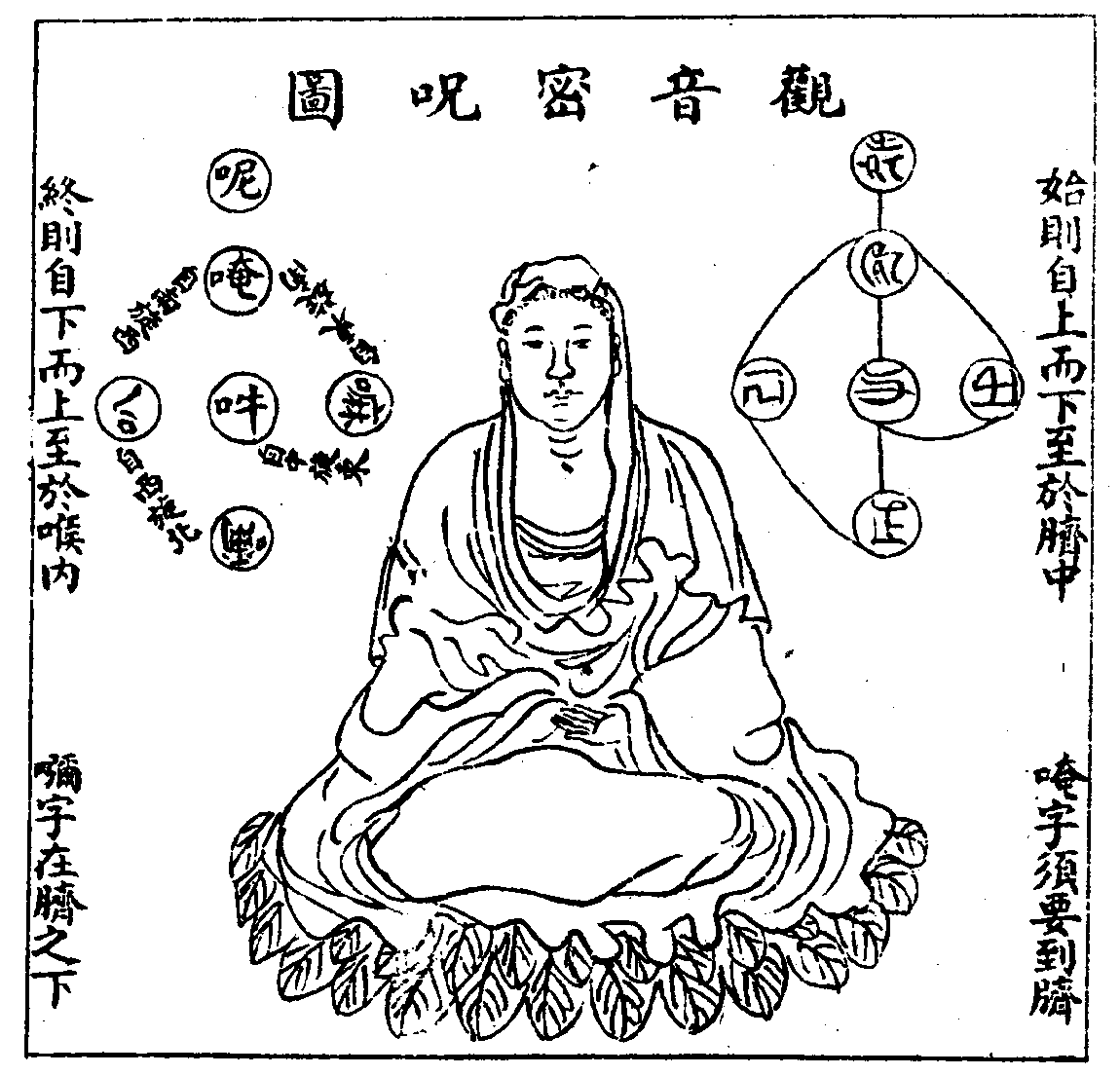
Instructions on utilizing the mantra from the Xingming guizhi, a Ming dynasty (1368 - 1644) Taoist manual.

Usage of the mantra has spread into Taoism, where various figures from the Buddhist pantheon such as Śākyamuni Buddha and Avalokiteshvara have been incorporated as part of the Taoist pantheon. Like in Buddhism, usage of the mantra is widespread in mainstream Taoist practice.

A key example of the mantra's employment is the practice of a chanting exercise which maps the syllables to specific areas of the body. During the exercise, the practitioner recites the mantra using certain intonations while performing specific visualizations in order to attain a transcendental state of experience. The mantra is also widely used by Taoist practitioners when creating fulus (Taoist charms that are usually written in a talismanic script).

== Transliterations ==
In English, the mantra is variously transliterated, depending on the schools of Buddhism as well as individual teachers.

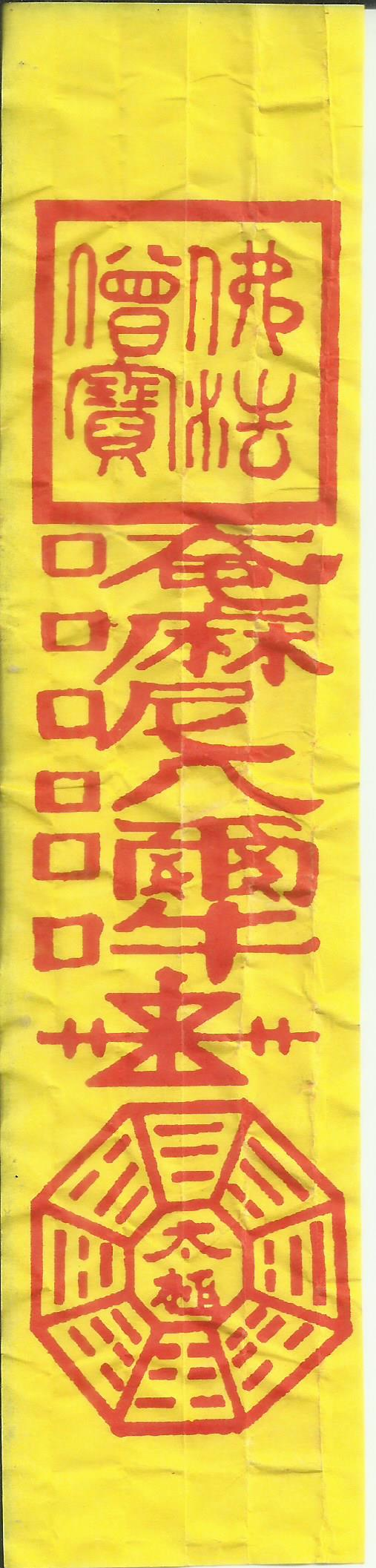
A fulu written using the Chinese hanzi transliteration of "Om mani padme hum"

Most authorities consider maṇipadme to be one compound word rather than two simple words. Sanskrit writing does not have capital letters and this means that capitalisation of transliterated mantras varies from all caps, to initial caps, to no caps. The all-caps rendering is typical of older scholarly works, and Tibetan Sadhana texts.

- ISO-15919 (Roman alphabet): ōṁ maṇi padmē hūm̐
- IAST (Roman alphabet): Oṃ Maṇi Padme Hūm̐
- Tibetan: ཨོཾ་མ་ཎི་པདྨེ་ཧཱུྃ(Tibetan Pinyin: Õ Mani Päme Hũ)
- Devanagari: ॐ मणिपद्मे हूँ
- Manchu: ᢀᠣ ᠮᠠᢏᡳ ᢒᠠᡩᠮᡝ ᢀᡥᡠᡠ Om mani padme huum
- Mongolian:
  - Mongolian: ᢀᠣᠸᠠ ᠮᠠᢏᢈ ᢒᠠᢑᠮᠧ ᢀᠾᠤᠤ Owam mani padme huum
  - Khalkha: Ум мани бадмэ хум (Um mani badme khum)
  - Buryat: Ом маани бадмэ хум (Om maani badme khum)
  - Kalmyk: Ом мани бадме хум (Om mani badme xum)
- 'Phags pa: ꡝꡡꡏ ꡏ ꡋꡞ ꡌꡊ ꡏꡠ ꡜꡟꡃ ʼom ma ni pad me hung
- Tangut: 𗙫𗏵𗐱𗴟𗘺𗦀 ꞏa mja¹ nji² pja¹ mjij¹ xo
- Old Uyghur: oom mani badmi xung
- Jurchen: am ma ni ba mi xu
- Meitei (Manipuri): ꯑꯣꯝ ꯃꯅꯤ ꯄꯗ꯭ꯃꯦ ꯍꯨꯡ (ōm manee padme hūng)
- Chinese: 唵嘛呢叭咪吽; pinyin: Ōng mānī bēimēi hōng or 唵麼抳缽訥銘吽; pinyin: Ōng móní bōnèmíng hōng
- Korean: 옴 마니 반메 훔 (Om Mani Banme Hum) or 옴 마니 파드메 훔 (Om Mani Padeume Hum)
- Japanese: オーム・マニ・パドメー・フーム (Ōmu Mani Padomē Fūmu) or オムマニペメフム (Omu Mani Peme Fumu); however, in practice a Japanese pronunciation of 唵麼抳缽訥銘吽, such as on ma nei hatsu mi un, is used, e.g. in translations and adaptations of Journey to the West.
- Vietnamese: Án ma ni bát mê hồng
- Siddham: 𑖌𑖼 𑖦𑖜𑖰 𑖢𑖟𑖿𑖦𑖸 𑖮𑗝𑖼
- Lepcha: ᰣᰨᰵ ᰕᰍᰧ ᰎᰳᰕᰬ ᰝᰫᰵ
- Limbu: ᤀᤥᤱ ᤔᤏᤡ ᤐᤍ᤻ᤔᤣ ᤜ᤺ᤢᤱ
- Brahmi: 𑀑𑀁 𑀫𑀡𑀺 𑀧𑀤𑁆𑀫𑁂 𑀳𑀽𑀁
- Telugu: ఓం మణి పద్మే హుం
- Nepali: ॐ मणि पद्मे हुँ
- Newari: 𑑉 𑐩𑐞𑐶 𑐥𑐡𑑂𑐩𑐾 𑐴𑐸𑑃
- Assamese: ওঁ মণি পদ্মে হুঁ (Öm Moni Podme hum)
- Bengali: ওঁ মণি পদ্মে হুঁ (Om Moni Pôdde hum)
- Odia: ଓ‍ଁ ମଣି ପଦ୍ମେ ହୁଁ (Oṃ Maṇi Padme Huṃ)
- Sinhala: ඕං මණි පද්මේ හුං
- Tamil: ௐ மணி பத்மே ஹூம்
- Malayalam: ഓം മണി പദ്മേ ഹും
- Kannada: ಓಂ ಮಣಿ ಪದ್ಮೇ ಹುಂ
- Grantha: 𑍐 𑌮𑌣𑌿 𑌪𑌦𑍍𑌮𑍇 𑌹𑍂𑌁
- Chakma: 𑄃𑄮𑄀 𑄟𑄧𑄕𑄨 𑄛𑄧𑄘𑄳𑄟𑄬 𑄦𑄪𑄀
- Burmese: ဥုံမဏိပဒ္မေဟုံ (Burmese pronunciation: [òʊɰ̃ ma nḭ paʔ mè hòʊɰ̃])
- Mon: ဥုံမဏိ ပဒ္မေ ဟုံ (ʼūṃmaṇi padme huṃ)
- Shan: ဢုုံမꧣိပၻ်မေႁုံ
- Lanna: ᩒᩴ ᨾᨱᩥ ᨸᨴ᩠ᨾᩮ ᩉᩪᩴ
- Thai: โอํ มณิ ปทฺเม หุํ
- Khmer: ឱំ មណិ បទ្មេ ហុំ
- Lao: ໂອໍ ມະນິ ປັທເມ ຫຸໍ
- Cham: ꨀꨯꨱꩌ ꨠꨘꨪ ꨚꩅꨠꨯꨮ ꨨꨭꨩꩃ
- Balinese: ᬑᬁ ᬫᬡᬶ ᬧᬤ᭄ᬫᬾ ᬳᬸᬁ
- Javanese: ꦎꦀ ꦩꦟꦶ ꦥꦢ꧀ꦩꦺ ꦲꦸꦀ
- Tagalog (Filipino): ᜂᜋ᜔ ᜋᜈᜒ ᜉᜇ᜔ ᜋᜒ ᜑᜓᜋ᜔ Um mani pad mi hum

=== Variations ===
The mantra: Oṃ Maṇi Padme Huṃ Hrīḥ

As Bucknell et al. (1986, p. 15) say, the complete Avalokiteshvara Mantra includes a final hrīḥ (Sanskrit: ह्रीः, IPA: [ɦɽiːh]), which is iconographically depicted in the central space of the syllabic mandala as seen in the ceiling decoration of the Potala Palace. The full mantra in Tibetan is thus: ཨོཾ་མ་ཎི་པདྨེ་ཧཱུྂ་ཧྲཱིཿ The hrīḥ is not always vocalized audibly and may be resonated "internally" or "secretly" through intentionality.

According to Sam Van Schaik, Tibetan works from Dunhuang which was a major cult center of Avalokitesvara, contain numerous mantras associated with this figure, the six syllable mantra only being one of many. Some of these are lesser known variations on the six syllable mantra such as: Om vajra yaksa mani padme hum.

Another variation, noted by Peter Alan Roberts, is Om manipadme hum mitra svaha.

== See also ==
- Ye Dharma Hetu
- Maṇi Kambum
- Ashtamangala
- Great Compassion Mantra – Expanded Compassion of Om Mani Padma Hum
- Heart sutra
- Samsara
- Samsara (2011 film)
- Shurangama Mantra – Expanded Protective Power of Om Mani Padma Hum
- Desire realm
- Yujia Yankou, an example of a Chinese Buddhist ritual where the mantra is employed
