= Original enlightenment =

East Asian Buddhist doctrine

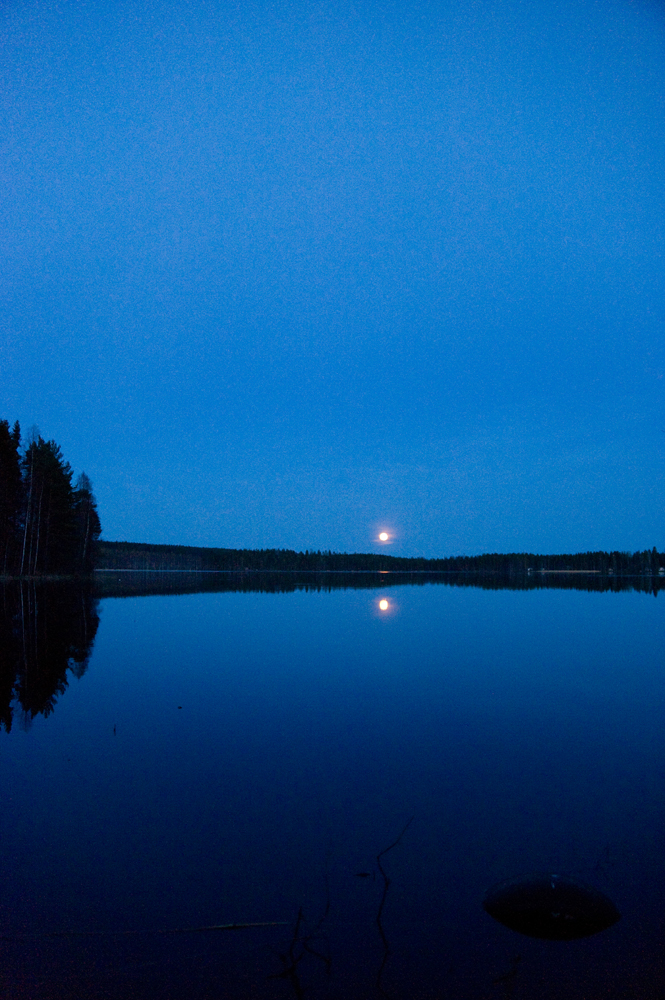
The moon reflected in water is a popular simile for enlightenment used by Dōgen in the Genjōkōan.

Original enlightenment or innate awakening (Chinese: 本覺; pinyin: běnjué; Japanese pronunciation: hongaku; Korean pronunciation: bongak; Vietnamese: bản giác) is an East Asian Buddhist doctrine often translated as "inherent", "innate", "intrinsic" or "original" awakeness.

This doctrine holds all sentient beings are already enlightened or awakened in some way. In this view, since all beings have some kind of awakeness as their true nature, the attainment of insight is a process of discovering and recognizing what is already present, not of attaining some goal or developing a potential. As such, people do not have to become Buddhas through religious cultivation, they just have to recognize that they already are awake, just like Buddhas. Original enlightenment thought is related to Indian Buddhist concepts like Buddha-nature and the luminous mind. The doctrine is articulated in influential East Asian works like the Awakening of Faith and the Sutra of Perfect Enlightenment, and was also influenced by the teachings of the Huayan school on the interpenetration of all phenomena.

Original enlightenment is often contrasted with "acquired", "initial", "actualized" or "the inception of enlightenment" (Chinese: 始覺; pinyin: shijué; Japanese pronunciation: shikaku), which is a relative experience that is attained through Buddhist practices and teachings by an individual in this life.

Original enlightenment is an influential doctrine of various schools of East Asian Buddhism, including Chan / Zen, Tiantai and Huayan. Inherent enlightenment was also often associated with the teachings of sudden enlightenment which was influential for Japanese Zen. The original enlightenment idea was also important for Korean Buddhism, especially Korean Seon. It was a central teaching in medieval Japanese Buddhist traditions like Shingon, Tendai, and also for some of the new Kamakura schools like Japanese Zen.

== History ==
=== Indian roots ===
The doctrine of innate enlightenment developed in Chinese Buddhism out of various Indian Mahayana ideas, such as the Buddha-nature (tathagatagarbha) doctrine, the luminous mind and the teachings found in various Mahayana sources, including the Śūraṅgama Sūtra, Ghanavyuha, Śrīmālādevī, Tathagatagarbha sutra, Nirvana sutra, and the Ratnagotravibhāga.

The influential Huayan-Chan scholar, Guifeng Zongmi, cites various Indian Mahayana sources for this idea. He cites a passage from the Avatamsaka Sutra which states, "When one first raises the thought [of awakening], one attains unexcelled, perfect awakening." He also cites the Nirvana Sutra, which states: "The two, raising the thought [of awakening] and the ultimate, are not separate."

The Prajña translation of the Buddhāvataṃsaka Sūtra (translated c. 798 by the Indian monk Prajña) also mentions the term, stating: "When the buddhas and bodhisattvas realize enlightenment, they convert the ālaya and attain the wisdom of original enlightenment" (Taisho no. 10 n0293 p0688a08).

=== Origins in China ===
The Chinese term itself is first mentioned in the Awakening of Faith in the Mahayana (c. 6th century). According to this treatise:

The essence of Mind is free from thoughts [心體離念]. The characteristic of that free from thoughts is analogous to the sphere of empty space that pervades everywhere. The one aspect of the world of reality (dharmadhātu) is none other than the undifferentiated Dharma body [dharmakāya], the “essence body” of the Tathāgata. [Since the essence of Mind is] grounded on the dharmakāya, it is to be called the original enlightenment. Why? Because “original enlightenment” indicates [the essence of Mind] in contradistinction to [the essence of Mind in] the process of the actualization of enlightenment; the process of actualization of enlightenment is none other than [the process of integrating] the identity with the original enlightenment.

The Awakening of Faith also identifies inherent enlightenment with "true suchness" (真如, tathātā), the mind which is pure in itself, and the tathagata-garbha. According to Jacqueline Stone, the Awakening of Faith sees original enlightenment as "true suchness considered under the aspect of conventional deluded consciousness and thus denotes the potential for enlightenment in unenlightened beings."

The idea is further discussed in the influential commentary to the Awakening of Faith titled On the Interpretation of Mahāyāna (Shi Moheyan lun, 釈摩訶衍論, Japanese: Shakumakaen-ron, Taisho no. 1668). Original enlightenment is also found in other influential East Asian works, like the Sutra of Perfect Enlightenment and the Vajrasamadhi Sutra.

The Sutra of Perfect Enlightenment explains inherent enlightenment or "Perfect Enlightenment" as the source of all phenomena (which are ultimately illusory), drawing on essence-function thought:

Good sons, all sentient beings' various illusions are born from the perfectly enlightened marvelous mind of the Tathagata, just like the sky-flowers come to exist in the sky. Even though the illusory flowers vanish, the nature of the sky is indestructible. The illusory mind of sentient beings also vanishes based on illusion, and while all illusions are utterly erased, the enlightened mind is unchanged.

The term also appears in the 8th century Amoghavajra translation of the Humane King Sutra:

I [the Buddha] constantly say to all sentient beings, “Only sever the ignorance [無 明] of this triple world; this is called becoming a Buddha. That which is pure in itself is called the nature of inherent enlightenment. This indeed is the universal wisdom of all Buddhas. This is the basis [本] for attainment [of Buddhahood] by sentient beings, and the basis for practice by all Buddhas and bodhisattvas. Therefore the bodhisattvas' practice on this basis (T. 8，836b29-837a4).

What these various Chinese sources have in common is that they understand the idea of original enlightenment as the "essence" of things in the framework of essence-function thought (tiyong) and thus see it as the ultimate source or basis for all phenomena.

The term is also found in the Platform Sutra (c. 8th to 13th century), a central text for Zen Buddhism:

Good friends, when I say 'I vow to save all beings everywhere,' it is not that I will save you, but that sentient beings, each with their own natures, must save themselves. What is meant by 'saving yourselves with your own natures'? Despite heterodox views, passions, ignorance, and delusions, in your own physical bodies you have in yourselves the attributes of inherent enlightenment, so that with correct views you can be saved.

=== Development in the mainland ===
In medieval China, the doctrine of original enlightenment developed in the East Asian Yogacara, Huayan and Chan Buddhist schools. The Huayan scholar Fazang presents an extensive analysis of the idea in his commentary on the Awakening of Faith. According to the Japanese scholar of hongaku thought, Tamura Yoshirō (1921–1989), "It was here in Huayen doctrine, a "philosophy of becoming", based on the idea of one principle or one mind, that the concept of original enlightenment first took on special significance".

Original enlightenment was also an important and widely pervasive doctrine in Chinese Chan and in the other continental Zen traditions. The Huayan-Chan scholar monk Guifeng Zongmi wrote about the idea from a Chan perspective, while also promoting the doctrine of sudden enlightenment, followed by gradual cultivation. Korean figures like Wŏnhyo, influenced by the thought of Zongmi, introduced the concept to Korean Buddhism, where it also had a considerable impact. The topic of original enlightenment was widely discussed and developed in Korea by figures like Wônhyo (617–686), Jinul (1158–1210), Kihwa (1376–1433) and Hyujông (1520–1604). According to Charles Muller, "all four of these men wrote extensively on the matter of the relationship between innate and actualized enlightenment." As such, the foundational view of the Korean Sôn tradition is grounded on the view of original enlightenment and essence-function metaphysics influenced by scriptures like the Platform Sutra, Sutra of Perfect Enlightenment, and the Awakening of Faith.

The teaching of the Awakening of Faith was eventually adopted into the Tiantai school by figures like the patriarch Zhanran (711–782). However, as Stone writes, Tiantai figures like Zhanran appropriated these ideas "in a manner consistent with their own metaphysics, that is, as denoting the interpenetration of the mind and all phenomena without assigning priority to either and without notions of original purity." As such, in classic Tiantai thought, original enlightenment is not an original source or a pure one mind (as in the Awakening of Faith), it merely refers to the doctrine that all phenomena (dharmas) are mutually inclusive and interrelated. The doctrine of original enlightenment also influenced the idea that insentient things also had buddha-nature, a doctrine popularized in some quarters of the Tiantai school which further integrated Huayan ideas into Tiantai.

However, since the founder of Tiantai, Zhiyi (538–597) had famously rejected the doctrine of the Awakening of Mahāyāna Faith of an originally pure mind that gives rise to the phenomenal world, some parties in the Tiantai school rejected the adoption of the idea into Tiantai. This Song era Tiantai debate was part of the so called "home mountain" (shanjia) vs. "off mountain" (shanwai) debates. The "off mountain" faction supported the original enlightenment view, which was influenced by the thought of Zongmi and Yongming Yanshou, and promoted the existence of the "one pure formless mind" like the Awakening of Mahāyāna Faith. The Tiantai patriarch Siming Zhili (960–1028) famously defended the home mountain faction and argued against the Awakening of Faith—original enlightenment view.

=== In Japanese Buddhism ===
Kūkai (774–835), founder of Shingon Buddhism, was one of the first Japanese authors to discuss original enlightenment. He was fond of the Awakening of Faith (and the Shi Moheyan lun commentary), so his view of the teaching is based on these sources.

==== In Tendai ====
The doctrine of innate enlightenment (jp: hongaku) was also very influential in the Tendai school. The Tendai founder Saichō, in various works like his Kenkairon, Jubosatsukaigi, and his commentary on the Sutra of Innumerable Meanings, discusses the concept of the pure mind and the buddha-nature in a way which prefigures later Tendai hongaku thought. For example, in his discussion of the bodhisattva precepts in the Jubosatsukaigi, Saichō writes:

These are the single precepts of the Tathagata, the diamond treasure precepts. They are the precepts which are (based on) the eternally abiding Buddha-nature, the foundational source of all sentient beings, pure in itself and immobile like space. Therefore by means of these precepts one manifests and attains the original, inherent, eternally abiding Dharma-body with its thirty-two special marks (DDZ 1:304).

Original enlightenment thought became particularly important for the tradition during the time from the late Heian cloistered rule era (1086–1185) through the Edo period (1688–1735). During the late Heian and Kamakura periods, new texts were produced which focused specifically on original enlightenment and a new branch of Tendai developed, called hongakumon, which emphasized this teaching. These texts include the Contemplation of Suchness (Shinnyokan), the Honri taikō shu, Hymns on Inherent Enlightenment (Hongaku-san), with commentaries to it titled Chu-hongaku-san and Hongaku-san shaku, Shuzen-ji ketsu. During this time, lineages of secret oral transmission of hongaku teachings (kuden) also developed within Tendai. The following passage from the Shinnyokan illustrates the basic idea of original enlightenment found in these types of Tendai sources:

If you wish to attain buddhahood quickly or be born without fail in [the Pure Land] of Utmost Bliss, you must think, "My own mind is precisely the principle of suchness." If you think that suchness, which pervades the dharma realm, is your own essence (wagatai 我体), you are at once the dharma realm; do not think that there is anything apart from this. When one is awakened, the buddhas in the worlds of the ten directions and also all bodhisattvas dwell within oneself. To seek a separate buddha apart from one’s own person is [the action of] a time when one does not know that oneself is precisely suchness.

The main practice promoted in this text is simply to contemplate how ourselves and all other beings are identical to suchness, i.e. original enlightenment. This can be done in combination with any Buddhist practice, or any mundane activity. This practice is said to help one transcend all bad karma and defilement instantaneously by helping one see that they are also non-dual with enlightenment itself. This contemplation is also said to collapse all temporal and spatial dualities, leading one to realize that one is already a Buddha here and now, which also contains all places and all times, all bodhisattva stages and all sentient beings.

The medieval Tendai view of original enlightenment saw it as encompassing not only all sentient beings, but all living things and all nature, even inanimate objects—all were considered to be Buddha. This also includes all our actions and thoughts, even our deluded thoughts, as expressions of our innately enlightened nature. Tamura Yoshirō saw "original enlightenment thought" (本覺思想, hongaku shisō) as being defined by two major philosophical elements. One was a radical Mahayana non-dualism, in which everything was seen as pure, empty and interconnected, so that the differences between ordinary person and Buddha, samsara and nirvana, and all other distinctions, were ultimately ontologically negated. The other feature of medieval hongaku thought was a radical affirmation of the phenomenal world as an expression of the non-dual realm of Buddha nature.

This was expressed in popular phrases such as "the worldly passions are precisely enlightenment", "birth and death are precisely nirvana", "Saha is the Pure Land", and "the grasses, trees, mountains, and rivers all attain Buddhahood." According to Tamura, the negation of the duality between Buddha and human beings is taken to a radical end in Tendai hongaku sources, which affirm human beings as they are, with all their delusions, as true manifestations of Buddhahood." Tamura argues that such a strong emphasis on the actual world is due to influence of non-buddhist elements of Japanese culture.

According to Jacqueline Stone, these radical non-dual ideas "do not deny the need for practice. Rather, practice is no longer instrumentalized: it is not a means to enlightenment but inseparable from it. In the inversion of the path seen in hongaku literature, enlightenment becomes the ground of practice, rather than its end goal." Some hongaku sources state that this revolutionary view abandons the idea that enlightenment is achieved from the cause (practice) to the effect (buddhahood). Rather, hongaku thought takes us from the effect to the cause (juga kōin 従果向因).

==== Later developments ====
The Tendai view of hongaku had deep impact on the development of New Kamakura Buddhism (c. 1185 to 1333), for many of those who founded new Kamakura Buddhist schools (Eisai, Honen, Shinran, Dōgen and Nichiren) studied Tendai at Mount Hiei as Tendai monks. The influence of hongaku thought can be seen in Dōgen's view of the "oneness of practice and attainment" (shushō ittō 修証一等), in Shinran’s idea of the "immediate achievement of birth in the Pure Land" (sokutoku ōjō 即得往生) and in also in Nichiren's teaching that all the Buddha's practices and merits are inherent in the daimoku (the title of the Lotus Sūtra) and are directly accessible to those who chant it.

The teaching of original enlightenment remained a key doctrine for most Japanese Buddhist schools throughout their history, and remains influential today. Original enlightenment thought also influenced the development of other Japanese religions, like Shinto and Shugendō.

During the 1980s a Japanese movement known as Critical Buddhism led by Komazawa University scholars Matsumoto Shirō and Hakamaya Noriaki critiqued original enlightenment as an ideology that supports the status quo, and legitimates social injustice by accepting all things as expressions of Buddha nature. These scholars went even further in their critiques, arguing that the buddha-nature doctrine was not really Buddhist, but a kind of foundationalist substance theory similar to the Hindu doctrine of atman-brahman. Their critiques sparked a heated debate, as other Japanese scholars like Takasaki Jikidō and Hirakawa Akira defended the buddha-nature teachings and original enlightenment thought.

== See also ==
- Atman (Buddhism)
- Buddha nature
- Fitra
- Luminous mind
- Mencius
- Nirvana
- Nondualism

== See also ==
- Exclusivity (senju) and Innate Enlightenment (hongaku shiso) in Kamakura Buddhism
