= Guifeng Zongmi =

Chinese Huayan and Chan Buddhist monk and scholar

Guīfēng Zōngmì
- 圭峰宗密
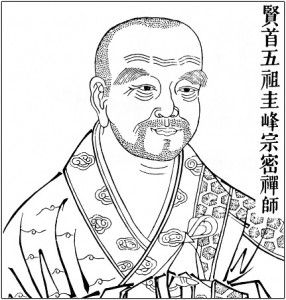
- Title: Samādhi-Prajnā Chan Master

Personal life
- Born: 780 Xichong County, Sichuan
- Died: 1 February 841 (aged 60–61) Chang'an

Religious life
- Religion: Mahayana Buddhism
- Order: Chan Buddhism, Huayan
- School: Heze school (Southern Chan) and Huayan school
- Lineage: Heze Chan lineage of Heze Shenhui through Suizhou Daoyuan; Huayan lineage via Qingliang Chengguan

Guifeng Zongmi (Chinese: 圭峰宗密; pinyin: Guīfēng Zōngmì; Japanese pronunciation: Keihō Shūmitsu) (780–1 February 841) was a Tang dynasty Chinese Buddhist monk and scholar who is considered a patriarch of both the Huayan school and Chan Buddhism. Zongmi wrote a number of works on several Mahayana Sutras, Chan and Huayan, and he also discussed Taoism and Confucianism. His works are a major source for studying the various Chan schools of the Tang.

Zongmi was deeply interested in both the practical and doctrinal aspects of Mahayana Buddhism, especially the teachings of the Sutra of Perfect Enlightenment and the Mahayana Awakening of Faith. Zongmi's work is concerned with harmonizing the various Chan teachings (especially the doctrines of sudden awakening and original enlightenment) with other Chinese Buddhist traditions, especially Huayan, though he also drew on the work of Tiantai Zhiyi in his ritual works. His philosophy attempts to create a comprehensive worldview that includes and sublimates all Buddhist and non-buddhist teachings of his time into a single harmonious spiritual vision.

== Biography ==
=== Early years (780–810) ===
Zongmi was born in 780 into the powerful and influential He (Chinese: 何) family in what is now central Sichuan. In his early years, he studied the Chinese classics, hoping for a career in the provincial government. When he was seventeen or eighteen, Zongmi lost his father and took up Buddhist studies. In an 811 letter to Chengguan, he wrote that for three years he "gave up eating meat, examined [Buddhist] scriptures and treatises, became familiar with the virtues of meditation and sought out the acquaintance of noted monks."

At the age of twenty-two, he returned to the Confucian classics and deepened his understanding, studying at the Yixueyuan (義學院) Confucian Academy in Suizhou. His later writings reveal a detailed familiarity with the Analects, the Classic of Filial Piety, and the Book of Rites, as well as historical texts and Daoist classics such as the works of Laozi. He eventually converted to Buddhism, but Zongmi's Confucian moral values never left him and he spent much of his career attempting to integrate Confucian ethics with Buddhism.

=== Chan (804–810) ===
At the age of twenty-four, Zongmi met the Chan master Suizhou Daoyuan (Chinese: 遂州道圓; pinyin: Suìzhōu Dàoyuán (Note: There are no records of the monk Daoyuan other than Zongmi’s testimony. Zongmi traced his Chan lineage to Shenhui (Chinese: 菏澤神會; pinyin: Hézé Shénhuì; Japanese pronunciation: Kataku Jinne, 680–758), and the Sixth Patriarch, Huineng (Chinese: 慧能; Japanese pronunciation: Enō, 638–713). He referred to this lineage as the Heze school of Chan.)) and trained in Chan for two or three years. He received Daoyuan's seal in 807, the year he was fully ordained as a Buddhist monk. Daoyuan was part of a southern Chan tradition called the Jingzhong school, which was based in Chengdu, Sichuan. This lineage goes back to the Korean prince and Chan master Kim Hwasang (c. 684–762, also known as Jingzhong Wuxiang, 浄衆無相 ), and to his student Shenhui (not to be confused with the earlier Heze Shenhui). According to Broughton, Daoyuan's teacher, Yizhou Nanyin, the abbot of Shengshou Monastery, likely trained with Heze Shenhui and this other Shenhui of Sichuan.

In his autobiographical summary, Zongmi recounts how after a sutra chanting service, he encountered a copy of the Sutra of Perfect Enlightenment. According to Gregory, "after only reading two or three pages, he had an awakening, an experience whose intensity so overwhelmed him that he found himself spontaneously dancing for joy." Zongmi would later write: "at one word [from Daoyuan] my mind-ground opened thoroughly, and with one scroll [of the Scripture of Perfect Enlightenment] its meaning was as clear and bright as the heavens."

Zongmi's sudden awakening during this period had a profound impact upon his subsequent scholarly career. He spent the next several years studying the Sutra of Perfect Enlightenment and its commentaries extensively. He propounded the necessity of scriptural studies in Chan, and was highly critical of what he saw as the antinomianism of the Hongzhou lineage derived from Mazu Daoyi (709–788), which practiced "entrusting oneself to act freely according to the nature of one's feelings".

=== Huayan (810–816) ===
In 810, at the age of thirty, Zongmi met Lingfeng (Chinese: 靈峯), a disciple of the preeminent Buddhist scholar and Huayan exegete Chengguan (Chinese: 澄觀, 738–839). Lingfeng gave Zongmi a copy of Chengguan's commentary and sub-commentary on the Avatamsaka Sutra. The two texts were to have a profound impact on Zongmi. He studied these texts and the sūtra with great intensity, declaring later that due to his assiduous efforts, finally "all remaining doubts were completely washed away." In 812 Zongmi travelled to the western capital, Chang'an, where he spent two years studying with Chengguan, who was not only the undisputed authority on Huayan, but was also highly knowledgeable in Chan, Tiantai, the vinaya and East Asian Mādhyamaka.

=== Mount Zhongnan and scholarly work (816–828) ===
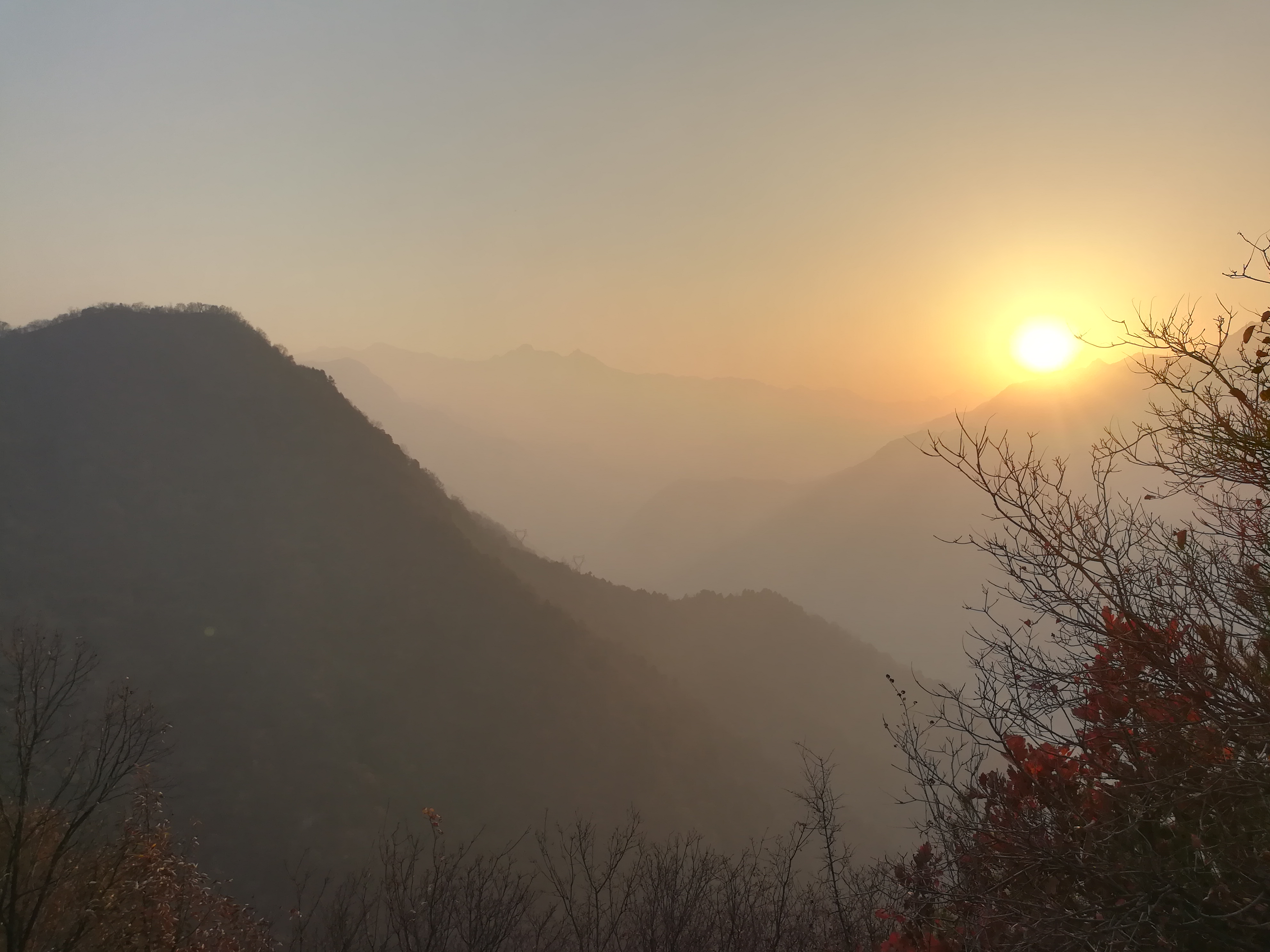
The Zhongnan Mountains

In 816, Zongmi withdrew to the Zhongnan Mountains southwest of Chang'an and began his writing career, composing an annotated outline of the Sutra of Perfect Enlightenment, and a compilation of passages from four commentaries on the sūtra. For the next three years Zongmi continued his scholarly research, reading through the Buddhist canon, the Tripiṭaka, and traveling to various temples on Zhongnan. He returned Chang'an in 819 and continued his studies utilizing the extensive libraries of various monasteries in the capital city. In late 819 he completed a commentary (Chinese: 疏; pinyin: shū) and subcommentary (Chinese: 鈔; pinyin: chāo) on the Diamond Sutra. In early 821 he returned to Cottage Temple (Chinese: 草堂寺; pinyin: Cǎotáng sì) beneath Gui Peak and hence became known as "Guifeng Zongmi". In mid-823, he finally finished his own commentary on the text that had led to his first awakening, Sutra of Perfect Enlightenment, and the culmination of a vow he had made some fifteen years earlier. For the next five years, Zongmi continued writing and studying in the Zhongnan Mountains as his fame grew.

=== Capital city (828–835) ===
Zongmi was summoned to the capital in 828 by Emperor Wenzong (r. 826–840) and awarded the purple robe and the honorific title "Great Worthy" (大德; dade; bhadanta). The two years he spent in the capital were significant for Zongmi. He was now a nationally honored Buddhist master with extensive contacts among the literati of the day, such as the devout Buddhist layman and scholar-official Pei Xiu and the famed poet Bai Juyi (772–846).

During this time, Zongmi turned his considerable knowledge and intellect towards writing for a broader audience rather than the technical exegetical works he had produced for a limited readership of Buddhist specialists. His scholarly efforts became directed towards the intellectual issues of the day and much of his subsequent work was produced at the appeals of assorted literati of the day. One such works directed at the lay literati was Inquiry into the Origin of Humanity.

During this period, Zongmi also began collecting every extant Chan text in circulation with the goal of producing a Chan canon to create a new section of the Buddhist canon. This work is lost, but the title, Collected Writings on the Source of Chan (禪源諸詮集; Chanyuan zhuquanji) remains.

=== Last years (835–841) ===
It was Zongmi's association with the great and the powerful that led to his downfall in 835 in an event known as the Sweet Dew Incident. A high official and friend of Zongmi, Li Xun, in connivance with Emperor Wenzong of Tang and his general Zheng Zhu, attempted to curb the power of the court eunuchs by killing them all. The plot failed and Li Xun fled to the Zhongnan Mountains, seeking refuge with Zongmi. Li Xun was quickly captured and executed and Zongmi was arrested and tried for treason. Impressed with Zongmi's bravery and honesty in the face of execution, the eunuch generals spared Zongmi.

Little is known about Zongmi's activities after this event, though he certainly would not have been welcome at court and evidence from his late commentary on the Yulanpen sutra indicates he returned home to Sichuan. Zongmi died in the zazen posture on 1 February 841 in Chang'an. According to his wishes, his body was left as food for scavengers, and was then cremated. Twelve years later he was awarded the posthumous title "Samādhi-Prajñā Dhyāna Master" and his remains were interred in a stupa called Blue Lotus. (Note: For details on the Sweet Dew Incident and Zongmi’s death, see Gregory, 2002:85–90)

=== Influence ===
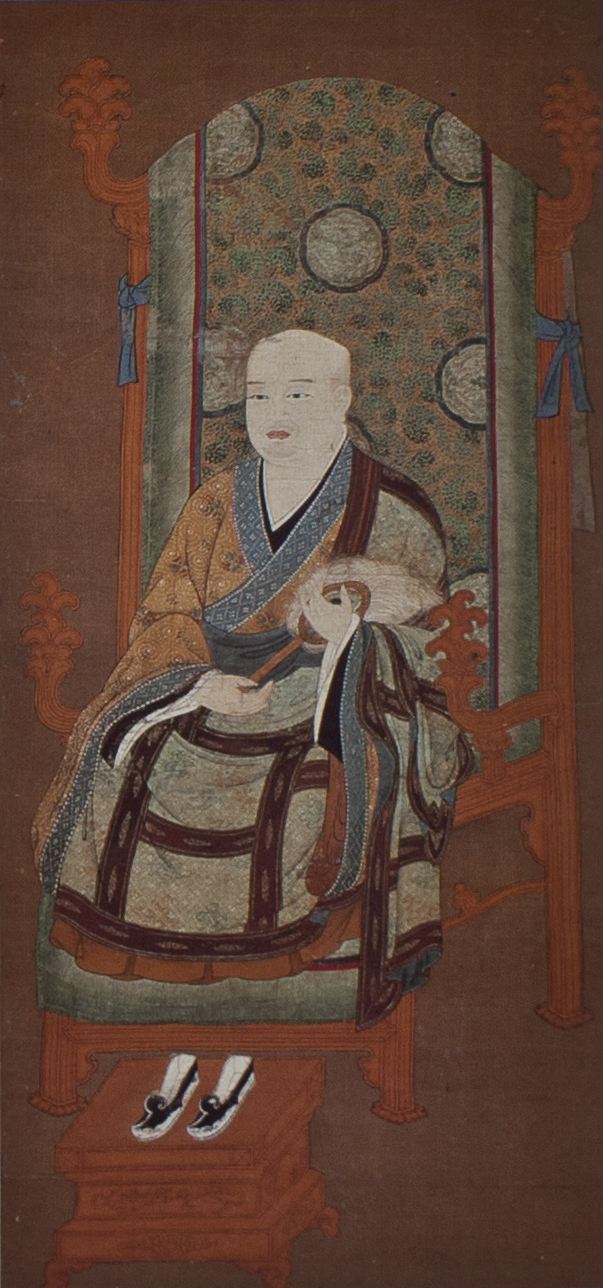
Potrait of Guifeng Zongmi (Japanese: Keihō Shūmitsu) from the Kegon-affifiated temple of Tōdai-ji in Nara, Japan. 15th century.

Zongmi's work continued to be studied by later Chinese Buddhists. His ecumenical vision of Chan as a single family with many branches and his account of Tang Chan lineages were influential sources for later Song dynasty Chan works. His work was also very influential on the "Huayan-Chan" traditions of the Khitan Liao Empire (916–1125) and the Tangut kingdom (1038–1227) of the Western Xia.

Zongmi's ideas also remained influential during the later Song and Ming dynasties. For example, Zongmi's views about sudden awakening, gradual cultivation, and the importance of scripture to Chan practice was influential on the later Chan figure Yongming Yanshou, whose Mind Mirror (Zongjinglu) echoes Zongmi's views on these topics. The Mind Mirror was widely printed during the Song dynasty and widely circulated. According to Broughton, the Mind Mirror "conveyed to Song Chan the most fundamental elements of Zongmi's Chan Prolegomenon, sometimes in Zongmi's wording or close paraphrases". Zongmi's paradigm of "sudden awakening, gradual cultivation" was also promoted and defended by later Chan figures like as Dahui Zonggao (1089–1163) and Hanshan Deqing (1546–1623).

Zongmi's work was also very influential on the Song era Tiantai school. This led to the "home mountain" vs "off mountain" debates initiated by Siming Zhili who penned extensive criticisms of Zongmi's teaching.

According to Albert Welter, during the Song era, there were to main contrasting styles of Chan, the "moderate" sutra based Chan (wenzi chan) of Zongmi and Yanshou, and the "rhetorical" Chan of the Linji school which is based on recorded sayings literature (like the Linji yulu). The rhetorical Chan held that Chan was "separate transmission outside the teachings" (jiaowai biechuan) and thus saw sutra based Chan as a confused and futile method and the sutras as "old toilet paper that wipes away filth" (Extensive Record of Yunmen).

Furthermore, Zongmi's thought also influenced later Neo-Confucianism. For example, Zhu Xi's (1130–1200) critique of Chan Buddhism is a but recapitulation, in Confucian terms, of Zongmi's critique of the Hongzhou school.

The Chan of Zongmi and Yanshou was also influential on Korean Buddhism, due to its impact on Jinul's (1158–1210) system, who also argued for the unity of Chan and the teachings. According to Broughton, Jinul's influential Excerpts from the Separately Circulated Record of the Dharma Collection with Inserted Personal Notes "is an expression of sutra-based sudden awakening gradual practice Guifeng Chan". The gradual practice is centered around the Kanhua Chan of Dahui, making Jinul's system a mix of Zongmi Chan and Dahui's Linji Chan. Zongmi's Chan Preface remained one of the most widely printed texts throughout Korean Buddhist history, with a large number of woodblock print editions. Zongmi's thought continues to be influential on modern Korean Seon (where the Preface remains part of the study curriculum of the Chogye order), and his ideas remain a major topic of discussion today.

Through the influence of the Mind Mirror, Zongmi-Yanshou Chan also reached Japan, where it was influential on the Daruma school of Zen and on the thought of early Rinzai figures like Myoan Yosai (1141–1215) and Enni Ben'en (1202–1280). The works of Zongmi and Yanshou were also printed by the monasteries of the Five Mountains of Rinzai (around Kyoto and Kamakura). This tradition valued textual study, and the influence of Zongmi can be seen in the works of some of its important literari figures, like Kiyō Hōshū (1361–1424), who promoted Zongmi's teachings with the aphorism: "No Zen separate from the teachings; no teachings separate from Zen."

== Philosophy ==
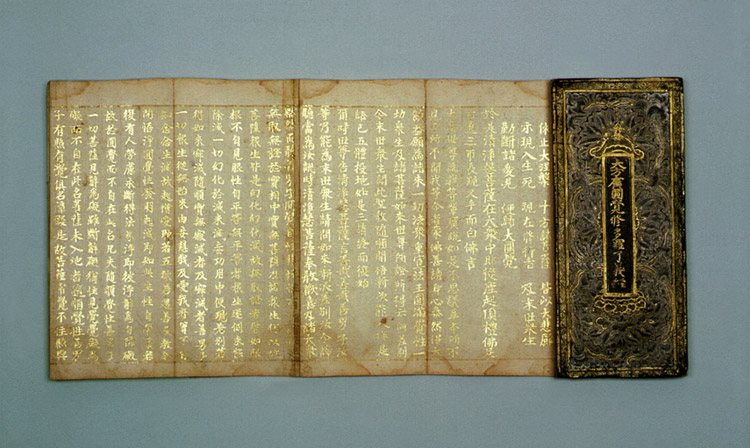
Zongmi's doctrinal views are largely based on the Sutra of Perfect Enlightenment.

Zongmi's lifelong work was the attempt to incorporate differing and sometimes conflicting systems into an integrated framework that harmonized various Buddhist teachings and traditions, especially those of Chan practice and Huayan doctrine. More specifically, according to Peter Gregory, one of Zongmi's main philosophical projects was to reformulate Huayan thought so as to "provide an ontological basis and philosophical rationale for Ch'an practice". This philosophical basis also provided a basic ethical theory for Chan which could stand up against Confucian critiques. It also provided the moral foundations needed to critique the more antinomian forms of Chan Buddhism that had developed in the Tang.

Metaphysically speaking, Zongmi moves beyond the thought of earlier Huayan thinkers like Fazang, who emphasized the doctrine of perfect interfusion or unobstructed interpenetration. Instead, Zongmi emphasizes the teachings of the Mahayana Awakening of Faith on the "one mind" (一心) and the teachings of the Sutra of Perfect Enlightenment on the teaching of sudden enlightenment (頓教) followed by gradual cultivation, which is based on the originally enlightened mind that all beings have.

=== Classification of teachings ===
As with many Chinese Buddhist scholars, doctrinal classification (Chinese: p’an chiao) was an integral part of Zongmi's work. Such taxonomical schemas (prefigured by Indian ideas like the three turnings of the wheel) were important in Chinese Buddhism, since they provided a sense of order and a hermeneutical structure to the mass of Buddhist teachings which contained numerous, seemingly conflicting ideas and which had been transmitted to China at different times.

Zongmi's classification system, influenced by previous Huayan schemas like those of Fazang and Chengguan, provided a schematic analysis of various teachings and practices which explained and harmonized their differences. Zongmi organized all teachings into a hierarchical schema that integrates and validates all traditions and teachings, seeing each lower category as partially true. According to Gregory, "the logic by which such a synthetic approach worked was dialectical. Each teaching overcame the particular shortcoming of the one that preceded it, and the highest teaching was accorded that vaunted position precisely because it succeeded in sublating all of the other teachings within itself."

Zongmi's mature panchiao (found in sources like Inquiry into the Origin of Humanity and Chan Preface) arranged the Buddhist teachings into five categories:

1. The teaching of men and gods (人天教), teaches ethics, karmic retribution and rebirth;
2. The teachings of the Hinayana ("Lesser Vehicle", non-Mahayana Śrāvakayāna Buddhism, Ch: 小乘教); including the doctrine of not-self and the classic teachings of Abhidharma Buddhism;
3. The Mahayana teaching of the analysis of phenomenal appearances (大乘法相教), mainly referring to the Yogacara teachings which see all phenomena as constructed by mind;
4. The Mahayana teaching of the negation of phenomenal appearances (大乘破相教), the teaching of emptiness and Madhyamaka which sees all phenomena, even mind, as equally unreal;
5. The teaching of the one vehicle (ekayāna) that reveals the nature (一乘顯性教) also known as the "teaching of the nature" (xingzong, i.e. faxing zong, "Dharmata teaching"), which is associated with the teaching of intrinsically enlightened pure mind found in the Awakening of Faith and the Sutra of Perfect Enlightenment. It teaches that one's own mind is the true nature (Ch: zhenxing, Skt: tattva), which is the true mind (zhenxin), empty, calm, intrinsically pure. It is a clear, bright and constant knowing (Ch: zhi, Skt: jñana), also called buddha-nature, mind ground, etc.

In Zongmi's teaching, the "nature" of each person is identical with Buddha-nature, which is emphasised in Chan. He stated, "To designate it, initially there is only one true spiritual nature, that is not born, does not die, does not increase, does not decrease, does not become, and does not change." In giving this teaching the highest position, Zongmi's schema is quite different from the Huayan system of Fazang, who regarded the Huayan "perfect" teaching of the interpenetration of all dharmas (Ch: shih-shih wu-ai), as illustrated by the Indra's net metaphor, to be the supreme teaching.

Zongmi's thought instead focuses on the nature of the mind and on how all phenomena arise from that ultimate nature and are deeply interconnected with it. As such, Zongmi follows a doctrinal shift initiated by Chengguan, who also saw the idea of the "unobstructed interpenetration of the absolute and phenomenal" (li-shih wu-ai) and "nature origination" (how all phenomena arise from one ultimate nature) as a more foundational doctrine than the interpenetration of all phenomena (shih-shih wu-ai). Zongmi identifies this ultimate nature, the one true dharmadhatu, with the "one mind" taught in the Awakening of Faith and with buddha-nature. As such, for Zongmi, the highest teaching of the "One Vehicle" (Ekayāna), the culmination of Chan and Huayan, is grounded in this teaching of the ontological basis of all reality, which is the originally awakened mind, the ultimate "nature" or principle (li).

According to Gregory, Zongmi's classification scheme provides a dialectical progression, from a naive view, to increasingly apophatic positions (which culminate in the full apophasis of Madhyamaka that lets go of all views and words), to an advanced cataphasis which recovers the use of positive religious language as a method to directly reveal (hsien-shih) the true nature. Zongmi's defense of affirmative religious discourse (Ch: piao-ch'uan), against those who held that only a negative apophatic discourse (che-ch'uan, like Madhyamaka or some forms of Chan), is an important element of his Chan Preface. Zongmi held that the tradition which "takes the nature as its cardinal principle" made use of both types of discourse in order to reveal the true nature of reality. Zongmi thus affirms positive statements which describe ultimate reality as "empty tranquil awareness" (k'ung chi chih), "the enlightened illumination of awareness and vision", "the mirror-like radiance of the spirit", "brilliant refulgence", "clear tranquility," "clear and bright, unobscured, ever-present awareness" and so forth. According to Zongmi, without the positive elements, the negative descriptions of the ultimate cannot apply to anything but to a complete nothingness.

=== The intrinsically enlightened true mind ===
The central doctrine of the highest teaching which is at the core of Zongmi's thought is the idea that all beings are endowed with a "perfectly enlightened mind," which is none other than the buddha-nature (tathāgatagarbha), the Dharmadhātu (法界, absolute reality) and the "one mind" of the Awakening of Faith. According to Zongmi:

The teaching of the one vehicle that reveals the nature holds that all sentient beings without exception have the intrinsically enlightened true mind. From time without beginning it is permanently abiding and immaculate. It is shining, unobscured, clear and bright ever-present awareness. It is also called Buddha-nature, and it is also called tathagatagarbha. From time without beginning deluded thoughts cover it, and [sentient beings] by themselves are not aware of it. Because they only recognize their inferior qualities, they become indulgently attached, enmeshed in karma, and experience the suffering of birth-and-death. The Great Enlightened One took pity upon them and taught that everything without exception is empty. He further revealed that the purity of the numinous enlightened true mind is wholly identical with that of all Buddhas.

For Zongmi, the ultimate truth is characterized by "awareness" (chih), which he also sometimes describes as "numinous awareness" (ling-chih), "numinous awareness unobscured" (ling-chih pu-mei), "ever-present awareness" (ch'ang-chih), and "empty tranquil awareness" (k'ung chi [chih] chih). This awareness is not the defiled mind, mental discrimination, nor is it an object of the mind. According to Gregory, for Zongmi, this awareness is "the underlying ground of consciousness that is always present in all sentient life," it is "the noetic ground of both delusion and enlightenment, ignorance and wisdom, or, as he aptly terms it, the mind ground (hsin-li)." Zongmi explains the true nature as a "spiritual Knowing that never darkens," going on to state that whether one is enlightened or deluded, mind is "aware in and of itself," or "spontaneously Knowing" (自知; zizhi), without depending on sense objects or conditions. Zongmi understands the term "empty tranquil awareness" as encompassing both the positive and negative aspects of the ultimate reality. He says:

"Empty" means empty of all phenomenal appearances and is still a negative term. "Tranquil" just indicates the principle of the immutability of the true nature and is not the same as nothingness. "Awareness" indicates the revelation of the very essence and is not the same as discrimination. It alone constitutes the intrinsic essence of the true mind.

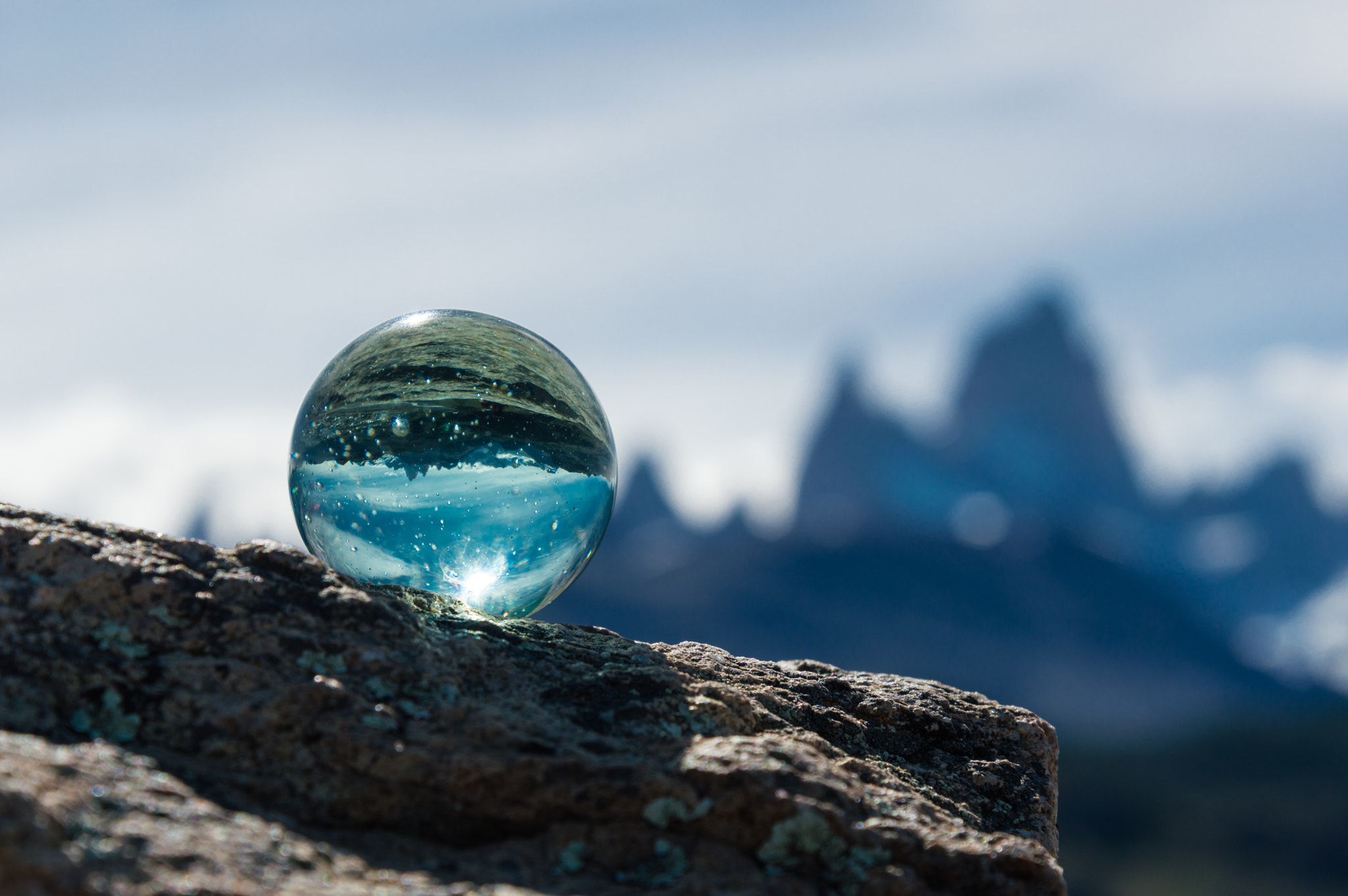
The Andes reflected in a crystal ball

In the Chan Letter, Zongmi illustrates the immutable and conditioned aspects of "the one spiritual mind" through the simile of the wish-fulfilling jewel (cintāmaṇi), which is like a crystal ball reflecting many colors. Because its substance is brightness, the jewel has the capacity to reflect. In terms of the analogy, where the reflected color characteristics represent the mind having come into contact with objective supports (ālambana), the jewel's brightness stands for awareness itself. Where the former is the conditioned principle, the latter is immutable. Moreover, although it has the potential to reflect them in all their variety, the jewel itself has no differentiation at all in terms of colors. As Zongmi says, "The variety is inherent in the color characteristics themselves; the bright jewel never changes." This is explained in the following way:

Just the perfect brightness of jade-like purity [yingjing yuanming] is the jewel substance [zhuti]. [...] The black color, up to and including all the other colors, such as blue and yellow, etc., are unreal. [...] When one truly sees the color black, the black from the outset is not black. It is just the brightness. The blue from the outset is not blue. It is just the brightness, up to and including, all the [other colors], such as red, white, yellow, etc., are like this. They are just the brightness. If, at the locus of the color characteristics, one after the other you just see the perfect brightness of jade-like sparkling purity, then you are not confused about the jewel. [...] If you are just free of confusion about the jewel, then black is non-black; black is the bright jewel, and so on with all colors. This is freedom [from the two extremes of] existence and non-existence. The brightness and the blackness are in fusion. How could there be any further obstacle?

Zongmi also utilizes a mirror analogy to illustrate a three truth model, with the mirror's luminous reflectivity standing for the highest truth. He says, "It is like a luminous mirror, which also has three aspects. The images reflected in a mirror—each of which appears distinct such that one cannot call something blue yellow, or something beautiful ugly—represent conventional truth. The reflections' lack of any nature of their own—each and every one of which is altogether empty—represents ultimate truth. The ever-present luminous reflectivity of the essence—which is neither empty nor coloured but can appear as empty and coloured—represents the highest truth." According to Peter Gregory, where the reflected images represent the mind as it adapts to conditions, and their lack of self-nature corresponds to the mind's unchanging aspect, the ever-present luminosity of the mirror points to "the one mind as the ultimate ground of all reality."

Zongmi follows the Śrīmālādevī sutra and the Awakening of Faith in seeing this ultimate mind ground as being both empty and not-empty in the sense that it is empty of defilement and discrimination, but not empty of positive qualities like the four perfect qualities (Skt: guṇapāramitā, which are: permanence, purity, bliss, and self), as well as all the buddha qualities.

For Zongmi, any gradual practice of the Buddhist path must be grounded in faith in the originally enlightened mind. This is what makes it possible to attain a sudden awakening to our own originally enlightened state. This true awakened mind is what is revealed during the experience of sudden awakening. It is a recognition of what is already the case, one's innate originally awakened nature. This is like how gold is already present in ore.

Before awakening, the true mind has two principles: being in concord with and not being in concord with unreal thought. Insofar as it concords with unreal thought, it can contain both purity and impurity and is known as the storehouse consciousness. But in its principle of not being in concord with unreal thought its substance is immutable and it is known as thusness. Zongmi's metaphysics follows the "one mind two gates" model of the Awakening of Faith which sees the mind as having an unchanging absolute aspect and a phenomenal appearing aspect. As such, Zongmi saw enlightenment and delusion as two parallel sides of the same non-dual reality.

Zongmi cites the Avatamsaka sutra which states that "there is not a single sentient being that is not fully endowed with the wisdom of the Tathagata" as a major source for this teaching. He also sees this teaching as exemplified by numerous sources, like the Sūtra of Perfect Enlightenment, the Śūraṅgama Sūtra, Ghanavyuha, Śrīmālādevī, Tathāgatagarbha Sūtra, Nirvana Sūtra, Awakening of Faith, Buddha-nature treatise (Foxing lun) and Ratnagotravibhāga.

=== Nature origination ===
This ultimate ground of reality, the "dharmadhatu of suchness" (chen-ju fa-chieh), is, according to Zongmi, "the pure mind that is the source of Buddhas and sentient beings." It is the nature or the essence of mind which gives rise to all dharmas (phenomena). Thus, "nature origination" (hsing-ch'i) refers to the manifestation of all phenomena in the universe from the ultimate nature.

Nature origination is also identified with the concept of the interpenetration of the absolute and the phenomenal realms (li-shih wu-ai). Like gold (i.e. the nature) and the various objects that can be produced from gold (dharmas), they are neither the same exact thing, nor are they different in essence.

According to Zongmi, this teaching of nature origination is one of the key differences between Huayan thought and Yogācāra, since for Yogācarā, the pure suchness is inert and unchanging, while in Huayan and in the Awakening of Faith, suchness also has a conditioned aspect that gives rise to all dharmas.

Furthermore, it is precisely due to the fact that all dharmas originate wholly from suchness that all dharmas also interpenetrate. As Zongmi writes, nature origination "is why Buddhas and sentient beings are inextricably interconnected and the pure and defiled lands harmoniously interpenetrate." As such, for Zongmi, the Huayan idea of the interfusion and interpenetration of all dharmas with each other (shih shih wu-ai) is subordinate to and derived from the interpenetration of the ultimate principle and phenomena that arise from it (li-shih wu-ai).

Zongmi also makes use of the East Asian discourse of essence and function (ti yong) to explain the ultimate nature. In this analysis, Buddha nature (i.e. suchness) is described as the essence (ti) which is the pure and absolute (pu-pien) aspect of the mind. Meanwhile, the innate capacities and manifestations of Buddha nature are its functioning, which includes an intrinsic unchanging awareness, and also the impermanent and conditioned (sui-yuan) aspects of mind which respond to various causes and conditions. According to Zongmi, all of these are aspects of a unitary reality which includes both dependent arising on the conventional level and also nature origination which is more fundamental and makes conventional causality possible. Ultimate reality thus includes all phenomena in the world which are all empty and interconnected with each other, as well as the ontological basis of reality, the dynamic mind ground of awareness (chih), which generates all phenomena.

=== The five stages of phenomenal evolution ===
Another key part of Zongmi's system is a theory of cosmogonic development which, as Gregory writes, "explains how the world of delusion and defilement, the world in terms of which unenlightened beings experience themselves, evolves out of a unitary ontological ground that is both intrinsically enlightened and pure." In this system, which is largely derived from the Awakening of Faith, the world of suffering, samsara, arises out of a primal dualistic delusion (i.e. the unenlightened aspect of the storehouse consciousness) which arises out of the primordial state of undifferentiated perfection. Zongmi compares the primal delusion to the act of a wealthy and well respected man falling asleep and forgetting who they are.

The five stages are:

1. The One Mind, the ultimate source (Ch: pen-yuan) of all pure and impure phenomena. It is the underlying nature (hsing) of all reality, the buddha-nature in all beings that is the basis for samsara and nirvana and yet transcends all dualities. It is also termed the wondrous mind of perfect enlightenment (in the Sutra of Perfect Enlightenment) and the one true dharmadhatu (in Huayan). Enlightenment for Zongmi is thus a return to the original source, which is also said to be ineffable, inconceivable and beyond thought.
2. The Two Aspects of the One Mind. As described in the Awakening of Faith, the one mind also has two aspects: the transcendent "mind as suchness", which is neither born nor dies, and the "mind subject to birth-and-death", which refers to the storehouse consciousness. As indicated by the Awakening of Faith, the second aspect (the storehouse) is an interfusion of buddha-nature and the conditioned deluded consciousness "in such a way that they are neither one nor different." This is compared to waves and water, though a wave is not identical to water itself, their nature is not different. As such, in this system, ignorance and delusion are adventitious manifestations of the one mind.
3. The Two Modes of the storehouse consciousness. These two modes are the enlightened mode, which is free of thought and gives rise to pure dharmas (phenomena) through pure dependent arising, and the unenlightened mode, which gives rise to impure dharmas (i.e. the world of samsara). The enlightened mode refers to intrinsic awakening, which is none other than the undifferentiated Dharmakaya. The unenlightened mode is "primordial unenlightenment" which gives rise to impure dependent arising, and which is yet also based on the enlightened nature (i.e. they are of the same essence).
4. The Three Subtle Phenomenal Appearances: 1. activation (yeh) or the activity of ignorance, 2. the perceiving subject, 3. the perceived object. The activity of ignorance is the initial "subtle movement of thought" which stirs the originally calm one mind, and this produces the duality of subject and object.
5. The Six Coarse Phenomenal Appearances, which is a step by step process found in the Awakening of Faith, each one leading to the other. The six are: [1] discrimination of likes and dislikes; [2] continuation: awareness and thoughts of pleasure and pain; [3] attachment to and objectification of perceptual objects; [4] conceptual elaboration; [5] karmic generation in which one's attachments lead to actions (karma); [6] suffering of karmic bondage - the experience of the consequences of one's past actions.

Zongmi also correlated these five stages to the various teachings in his doctrinal classification system, seeing different teachings as focusing on overcoming different stages of phenomenal development in a process that reverses the course of phenomenal evolution. As such, the first three stages of evolution are associated with the sudden and advanced teachings, while the fourth stage of evolution is correlated with the Yogacara teachings. The first two of the six coarse phenomenal appearances are then seen as covered by the Mahayana teachings on emptiness, the third and fourth appearances by Hinayana, and the last two phenomenal appearances are dealt with by the teaching of men and gods. Thus, this psycho-cosmogy provides another layer to Zongmi's soteriological map of Buddhist practice.

=== Sudden awakening, gradual cultivation ===
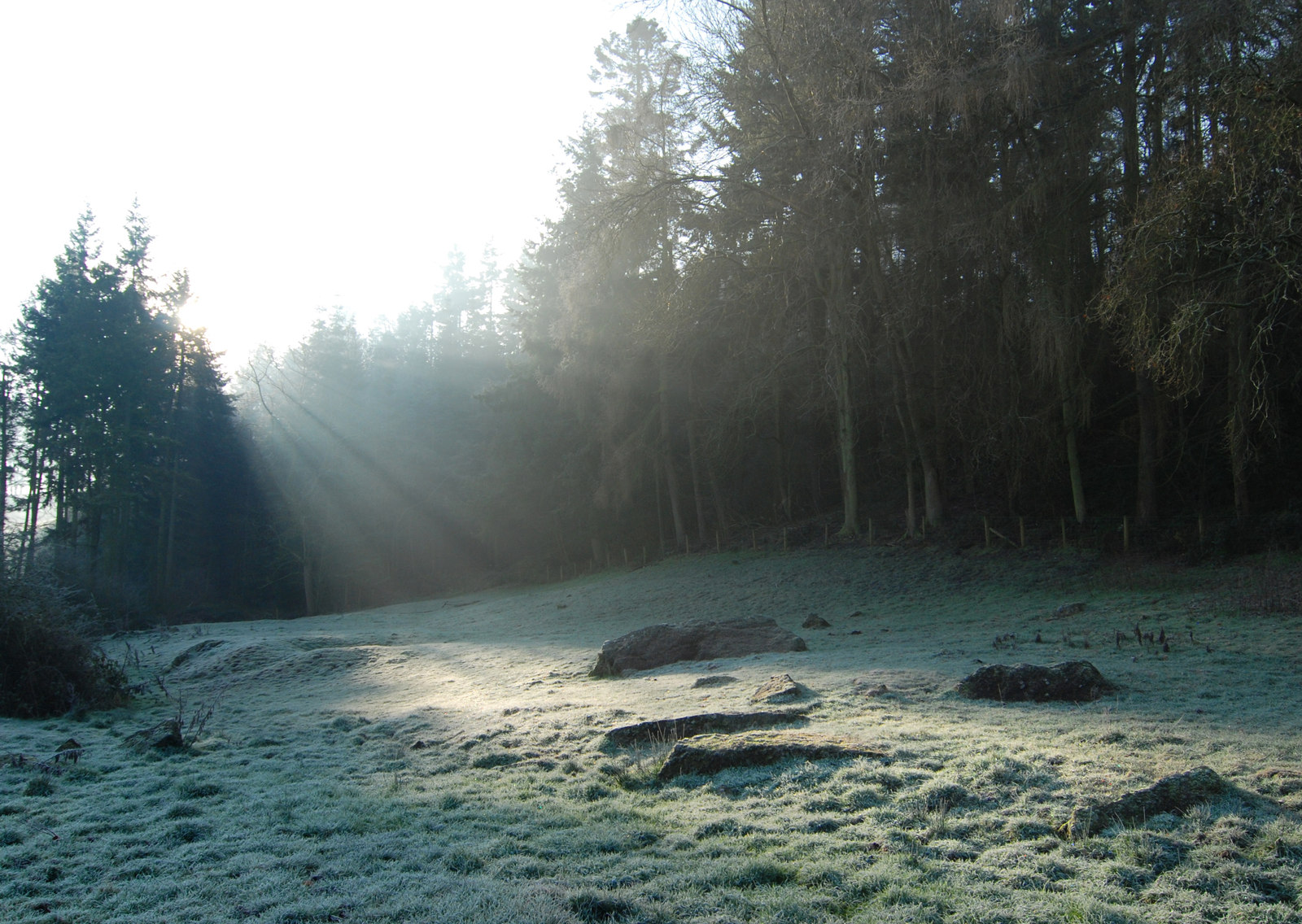
Zongmi used the simile of the sun melting frost to illustrate sudden awakening followed by gradual cultivation

Zongmi tried to harmonize the different views on the nature of awakening (bodhi). A key topic of debate in Tang Chan circles was the nature of awakening, and how it could occur suddenly. Zongmi advocated the view of sudden awakening (Ch: tun-wu), accompanied by gradual cultivation. In the Chan Preface, Zongmi writes that all ancient Chan teachings "first show the original nature [kaishi benxing] and then require reliance on this nature to practice dhyana [yixing xiuchan]."

Indeed, sudden awakening and gradual cultivation were ultimately one and the same according to Zongmi who writes:

It is only because of variations in the style of the World Honoured One’s exposition of the teachings that there are sudden expositions in accordance with the truth and gradual expositions in accordance with the capacities [of beings]…this does not mean that there is a separate sudden and gradual [teaching].

Zongmi thus understands "sudden" and "gradual" teachings as different ways or methods that express the same truth, not to two separate teachings or truths. Furthermore, although the sudden teaching reveals the truth directly, and results in a "sudden" understanding that all beings are Buddhas, this does not mean that one attained full Buddhahood right away. This is because the deeply rooted defiled seeds are only removed by extensive training which reduces these residual effects of past life conditionings.

As such, Zongmi differentiates between two types of awakening / enlightenment: the awakening of initial insight (chieh-wu) which is the basis of gradual cultivation and the awakening of full realization (cheng wu) which is the final awakening. This means Zongmi's analysis of the path has three main components: initial insight, gradual cultivation, full realization. Thus, Zongmi advocated "sudden enlightenment, gradual cultivation" (Ch: tun-wu chien-hsiu). Sudden awakening provides an initial insight into the true nature and gradual cultivation is needed to eliminate all remaining traces of defilements that prevented the total integration of the originally enlightened mind into all actions.

As Gregory writes: "the realization that one was a Buddha was not sufficient to guarantee that one acted like a Buddha. The gradual practices thus played a necessary role in the post-enlightenment actualization of the insight afforded by the sudden teaching to beings of superior capacity." Furthermore, for Zongmi, gradual practices are only truly authentic after the experience of sudden awakening. He writes "if one engages in spiritual cultivation without having first experienced enlightenment, then it is not authentic practice."

Zongmi described this sudden awakening event as follows:

Sudden enlightenment means that although [beings] have been deluded [from time] without beginning, recognizing the four elements as their body and deluded thoughts as their mind and taking them both together as constituting their self, when they meet a good friend who explains to them the meaning of the absolute and conditioned [aspects of suchness], the nature and its phenomenal appearance, the essence and its functioning ..., then they at once realize that [their own] marvelous awareness and vision is their true mind, that the mind—which is from the beginning empty and tranquil, boundless and formless—is the dharmakaya, that the nonduality of body and mind is their true self, and that they are no different from all Buddhas by even a hair.

Zongmi drew on various similes to explain the process of sudden awakening - gradual cultivation:

In terms of the elimination of hindrances, it is like when the sun immediately comes out, yet the frost melts gradually. With respect to the perfection of virtue, it is like a child which, when born, immediately possesses four limbs and six senses. As it grows, it gradually develops control over its actions. Therefore, the Hua Yen [Avatamsaka sutra] says that when the bodhicitta is first aroused, this is already the accomplishment of perfect enlightenment.

Zongmi also used the metaphor of water and waves found in the Awakening of Faith to explain this teaching. The essential tranquil nature of water which reflects all things (intrinsic enlightenment) is disturbed by the winds of ignorance (un-enlightenment, delusion). Although the wind may stop suddenly (sudden enlightenment), the disturbing waves subside only gradually (gradual cultivation) until all motion ceases and the water once again reflects its intrinsic nature (Buddhahood). However, whether disturbed by ignorance or not, the fundamental nature of the water (i.e., the pure luminous mind) never changes.

=== Stages of spiritual cultivation ===
Zongmi also outlined a ten-stage process of spiritual development. Each stage overturns a corresponding stage of the development of samsara, moving from coarser aspects to more subtle ones. The stages are as follows:

1. Sudden enlightenment: the initial insight into the true nature of the mind, the original enlightenment (benjue), which gives rise to faith.
2. Resolving to attain Buddhahood: one generates compassion, wisdom, and bodhisattva vow fueled by bodhicitta.
3. Cultivating the five practices of giving, morality, patience, striving and meditative insight (samatha-vipasyana).
4. Spiritual development - one further develops compassion, wisdom, and vows, and the three minds: straight mind, deep mind, and mind of great compassion.
5. Realizing the emptiness of self
6. Realizing the emptiness of dharmas
7. Mastery of form - one realizes that perceptual objects are manifestations of the mind and gains mastery over them.
8. Mastery of mind - one sees the perceiving subject as also illusory and gains mastery of it
9. Freedom from thought - one is fully aware of the origin of deluded thoughts and sees the true nature of mind.
10. Attainment of Buddhahood - returning to the ultimate source, realizing the non-duality of all things, even delusion and enlightenment, samsara and nirvana.

=== Scripture and doctrinal study ===
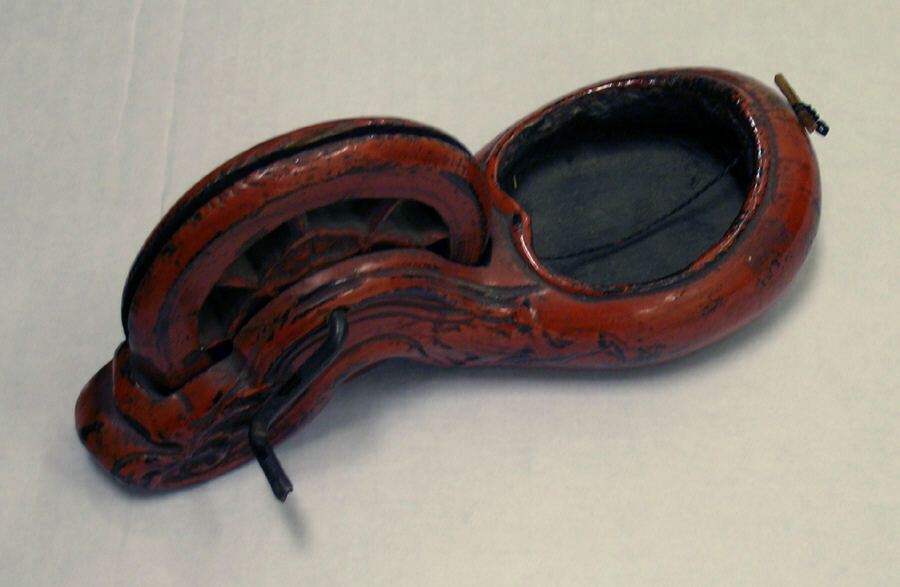
Japanese carpenter's marking line (19th century). Zongmi compared the sutras to an inked marking line used by craftsmen.

Aside from promoting the importance of "gradual" classic Buddhist practices such as taking of precepts and taking part in rituals, Zongmi also promoted the importance of doctrinal study as an indispensable element of spiritual cultivation. Indeed, for Zongmi, the Buddhist scriptures were a key element of validating one's spiritual experiences, even in Chan, which relies on a direct "mind to mind" transmission of the essential meaning. According to Zongmi, even though Bodhidharma taught in this direct way, he did not reject Buddhist scripture or see enlightenment as a separate teaching from what is taught in the sutras. Zongmi held that those who believed that Chan was separate from doctrinal study were deeply confused.

As such, Zongmi promoted the "correspondence of the teachings and Chan" (chiao-ch'an i-chih), which sees the meaning of Chan as the same as the meaning of the scriptures. Because of this, Zongmi's Chan Preface states that: "the scriptures are like a marking line to be used as a standard to determine true and false....those who transmit Ch'an must use the scriptures and treatises as a standard." According to Zongmi, Chan and Buddhism rely on three sources of knowledge (pramana): inference, direct perception and the word of the Buddha. Those who only rely on one of these are unbalanced, and they may go astray by merely relying on their own unguided experiences, which may be faulty. Zongmi thus promotes an approach to spiritual cultivation that relies on a harmonious development of both meditation and doctrinal study.

That being said, for Zongmi, the scriptures themselves are not Chan, which relies on an intuitive mysterious or dark understanding based on "getting the idea and forgetting the words". As such, the meaning of Chan and the sutras "are spontaneously understood in a mysterious way", not in a conceptual intellectual way. The reading and study of the sutras therefore, are a useful guide to the true meaning, but they are not the true meaning itself, which appears in the source of one's mind suddenly without calculation, and without becoming caught up in the words or clinging to the text. This is the meaning of the phrase Zongmi attributes to Bodhidharma "no involvement with the written word." It is not a rejection of textual study, but an indication that Chan realization goes beyond words even while also skillfully making use of the scriptures. This is the way in which the following simile by Zongmi on Chan (which is beyond words) and the scriptures is to be understood:

The sutras are like an inked marking string [shengmo], serving as a model by which to establish the false and the correct. The inked marking string is not the skill itself; a skillful craftsman must use the string as a standard [wei ping]. The sutras and treatises are not Chan; one who transmits Chan must use the sutras and treatises as a norm [wei zhun].

Broughton argues that the sutra-based "sudden enlightenment, gradual cultivation" Chan was the normative type of Chan during the Song and Ming dynasties, as well as in Goryeo Korea. Zongmi's sutra-based Chan view contrasts with another popular Zen narrative which sees Chan / Zen as being separate from textual learning altogether, and sees scriptural study as pointless for the Zen practitioner. According to Broughton, modern Japanese Rinzai Zen generally promotes this other popular narrative which is "an image of Zen framed by the Record of Linji—wherein the real teacher boldly discards the teachings of the Buddhist canon."

== Account of Chan Buddhism ==
Zongmi's analysis of Chan (i.e. Zen Buddhism) also attempted to harmonize the various splits and debates which existed among the various Chan schools of his time, which often engaged in debate and disparaging attacks on each other. Citing the parable of the blind men and the elephant, Zongmi thinks that the various competing Chan schools have different parts of the whole truth, and his doctrinal framework seeks to provide a holistic account of all of the various schools of Chan, writing: "If taken in isolation, each of them is wrong. But if taken together, each of them is valid." This shows Zongmi's basic doctrinal tendency which as Gregory explains "is always to articulate a comprehensive framework in which such discrepant perspectives can be harmoniously subsumed. Such a comprehensive framework not only provides a larger context in which the divergent perspectives can be validated as parts of a whole, it also provides a new and higher perspective that is superior to the others because it succeeds in sublating them within itself."

=== Critiques of Chan schools ===
Zongmi gave critiques on seven Chan schools in his Prolegomenon to the Collection of Expressions of the Zen Source and although he promoted his own Heze school as exemplifying the highest practice, his accounts of the other schools are mostly balanced. His works on Chan remain an invaluable source for the development of Buddhism in China. Zongmi's view of the various Chan schools is closely tied to his doctrinal classification system and his critiques of the various Tang Chan schools draw on his broader philosophical position.

Zongmi categorized all Chan lineages or houses as belonging to one of three main types of doctrinal systems (Skt: siddhanta, Ch: zong):

- the doctrine of " stopping thought of the unreal and cultivating mind (only)", which is associated with the consciousness-only school. According to Zongmi, Chan schools which focus on this doctrine include: Jingzhong, Northern school, Baotang, and the South Mountain Buddha-Recitation Gate school.
- the doctrine of "cutting off and not leaning on anything", which is associated with the teaching of emptiness and Madhyamaka. The Shitou and Oxhead schools are associated with this doctrine.
- the doctrine of "directly revealing the mind nature", which is associated with the buddha-nature teachings of the Dharma nature school (Zongmi's own view). This is considered to contain the clear and explicit (Skt: nitartha) meaning of the true nature. The Heze and Hongzhou lineages are associated with this doctrine.

==== Northern school ====
Zongmi's critique of Northern Chan was based on its practice of removing impurities in the mind to reach enlightenment. He associated this teaching with the Chinese Yogacara school and saw the practice as a gradual method that was not authentic Chan. Zongmi criticized this on the basis that the Northern school was under the misconception that impurities were inherently different or separate from the pure mind, making this a dualistic view that fails to understand the natural working of intrinsic enlightenment. Zongmi held that the impurities of the mind were merely adventitious, empty and ultimately non-dual with the pure mind, since they are nothing but the empty manifestations (yung) of the ultimate nature. Thus, the impurities are not inherently impure, they merely appear that way due to our dualistic misperception. In attempting to remove them one merely feeds that sense of duality. Instead, for Zongmi, we need to first have an initial awakening to the true nature of things, which includes the principle of the non-duality of the pure nature and the impure manifestations, of the identity of samsara and nirvana. It is only based on this awakening which validates the mundane world of appearances as a manifestation of the true nature that one can practice the path of Chan.

==== Oxhead school ====
Zongmi's criticism of another prominent Chan lineage, the Oxhead school, is based on their understanding of emptiness, which Zongmi saw as one sided. He claimed that the Oxhead School taught "no mind" (wuxin, 無心) but did not recognize the nonempty aspect of mind, assuming that the intrinsically enlightened nature is only "empty" and "that there is nothing to be cognized". Drawing on the buddha-nature sutras like the Nirvana sutra, Zongmi argues that emptiness does not mean a pure negation, since according to the Nirvana sutra, "when there is nothing in a jar, the jar is said to be empty-it does not mean that there is no jar." As such, the Chan teaching of "no mind" means that the true mind is empty of defilements and concepts. As such, the teaching of the Oxhead school is one sided since it only focuses on emptiness and negation, but does not know the intrinsically enlightened mind and the ultimate reality. In critiquing the purely negative dialectic of this school, Zongmi writes "if there are no real things whatsoever, then on the basis of what are illusions made to appear? Moreover, there has never been a case of the illusory things in the world before us being able to arise without being based on something real....therefore we know that this teaching merely destroys our attachment to feelings but does not yet reveal the nature that is true and numinous."

==== Hongzhou school ====
Zongmi was also critical of certain Chan sects that seemed to ignore the moral order of traditional Buddhism and Confucianism and that failed to understand the conventional truths of Buddhism in general. As such, Zongmi claimed the Hongzhou school, derived from Mazu Daoyi (709–788), believed "everything as altogether true". Zongmi does not critique Mazu himself (whom he sees as a great master), rather that "lineage's junior trainees" (bi zong houxue) who misunderstood his teachings. As such, the target of his critique is not Mazu, but Zongmi's ninth century Hongzhou contemporaries.

According to Zongmi, the Hongzhou teaching led some foolish people to a radical nondualism that believed that all actions, good or bad, and all experiences (anger, greed, pleasure, pain) were totally equal expressions of the Buddha-nature. As such, it collapses the ultimate essence into its myriad functions, holding that there is no essence apart from its functioning. Zongmi saw this as ethically dangerous, and as denying the need for ethics and spiritual cultivation. Zongmi also described their teaching as "entrusting oneself to act freely according to the nature of one's feelings". For Zongmi, this was a dangerously antinomian view as it eliminated all moral distinctions and validated any actions as expressions of the essence of Buddha-nature.

Furthermore, Zongmi also held that this view failed to understand that while the essence (buddha-nature, the mind ground) and its functions (all phenomena) are two aspects of a non-dual reality, they are also still different in an important way, because the essence is more fundamental, being the basis for enlightenment. Indeed, for Zongmi, they are ultimately "neither one nor different". As such, from the perspective of a sentient being, there is still a distinction between awakening and delusion. As Gregory writes, "their inseparability is what makes religious cultivation possible, and their difference is what makes religious cultivation necessary."

Because of this, Zongmi sees the Hongzhou practice of "simply allowing the mind to act spontaneously" as an inadequate form of spiritual cultivation. As such, Zongmi writes:

Hung-chou constantly says: "Since greed, anger, compassion, and good deeds are all the Buddha-nature, how could there be any difference between them?" This is like someone seeing that there is never any difference in the wet nature [of the water] and not realizing that there is an enormous difference between the success of a boat that crosses over it and the failure of a boat that capsizes in it. Therefore, as far as this line's approach toward sudden enlightenment is concerned, even though it comes close, it still does not hit the mark, and, as far as its approach toward gradual cultivation is concerned, it is mistaken and completely backward.

Thus, while Zongmi acknowledged that the essence of Buddha-nature and its expressions in the world are non-dual, he insisted that there is still a difference between good and evil, and affirmed the need for spiritual cultivation. Gregory writes that to avoid the dualism he saw in the Northern Line and the radical antinomianism of the Hongzhou school, Zongmi's paradigm preserved "an ethically critical duality within a larger ontological unity".

As part of his critique, Zongmi introduces a key distinction between two types of the functioning of the ultimate nature:

- "intrinsic functioning of the self-nature" (tzu-hsing pen-yung), which is "ever-present awareness". Zongmi compares this to the reflectivity of a mirror, its capacity to reflect.
- "responsive functioning in accord with conditions" (sui-yuan ying-yung), which he compares to the images reflected in a mirror and corresponds to psycho-physical functions like speech, discrimination, bodily movement, etc.

According to Zongmi, the Hongzhou school emphasizes the responsive functioning of buddha-nature, but fails to understand the intrinsic functioning of the self-nature. Indeed, Zongmi thinks that the Hongzhou school mistakes the mirror's reflections for its capacity to reflect. That is to say, it mistakes the various impermanent appearances for the true nature itself. This mistake means that they are unable to make ethical and practical distinctions.

Furthermore, Zongmi argues that the true nature can only be truly seen in the state of no-thought (wu-nien), which is like a reflective jewel that is not reflecting any colors and so can be seen just as it is. He cites the Awakening of Faith and Chengguan in support of this view. For Zongmi, this direct perception of the true nature, an empty tranquil awareness in which there are no thoughts, is what is at the core of the experience of sudden awakening. Zongmi argues the Hongzhou school lacks this knowledge, and that their teaching of spontaneous action can even become a rationalization for deluded activity. Thus, they lack knowledge of what sudden enlightenment is, and also of gradual cultivation.

==== Baotang school ====
Zongmi also criticized the Baotang school in similar ways. According to Zongmi, this school had misinterpreted Shenhui's teaching on "no-thought" as entailing "the rejection of all forms of traditional Buddhist ethical practice and ritual observance." According to Zongmi, this school rejected conventional Buddhist practices like "worship, repentance, reciting scriptures, painting Buddhist images, and copying sutras" because they sought to "extinguish discriminative consciousness" (mieh-shih).

== On the three teachings ==
Zongmi was also concerned with providing an inclusive view of the three main religions of China: Confucianism, Daoism and Buddhism. He saw all three as expedient means (upaya), functioning within a particular historical context. Although he saw Buddhism as revealing the highest truth, this had nothing to do with the level of understanding of the three sages (Confucius, Laozi and Buddha). Zongmi saw them as "consummate sages, who, in accord with the times and in response to beings, made different paths in setting up their teachings". As such, the three teachings differed in their goals and in the particular circumstances in which they arose, not in the truth realized by their founding figures.

As Zongmi writes:

Since encouraging the myriad practices, admonishing against evil, and promoting good contribute in common to order, the three teachings should all be followed and practiced. [However] if it be a matter of investigating the myriad phenomena, exhausting principle, realizing the nature, and reaching the original source, then Buddhism alone is the ultimate judgment.

Zongmi's early training in Confucianism led him to attempt to develop a syncretic framework where Chinese non-Buddhist principles could be integrated within Buddhist teachings. For example, Zongmi matches the five precepts with the five Confucian virtues (benevolence, righteousness, propriety, trustworthiness, wisdom), and he links Buddhist cosmological processes with Daoist cosmogony. Zongmi valued Confucian teachings greatly and did not reject its moral vision. He merely held that only Buddhism could provide the metaphysical foundation for it. He added Confucianism (along with Daoism) into his doctrinal classification scheme in an inclusive manner that validated them, something that previous Huayan scholars had not done.

Zongmi's worldview thus attempts to subtlate (Ch: shiyo) non-buddhist traditions (along with buddhist ones), which Zongmi saw as partially true, into what he considered to be a higher more comprehensive worldview. Since this supreme view was inclusive of other, supposedly more limited views, it was seen as a more impartial view that was called "round" or "having no sides" (yuan). Zongmi considered this to be the harmonious consummation of other views.

That being said, Zongmi also presented several criticisms of Confucianism as well as Daoism, such as in the first part of Inquiry into the Origin of Humanity, which critiques such concepts as the Way (dao), spontaneity (ziran), primal qi (yuanqi), and the mandate of heaven. One of Zongmi's main critiques of the view that the way of heaven determines all things is that this provides no grounding for ethics and no way to distinguish between good and evil. He critiques Confucianism's narrow focus on this life, and their failure to understand karma and rebirth. Zongmi also mounts a theodicy critique of the concept of the mandate of heaven, the idea that heaven (tian) "monitors the sociopolitical world of human endeavor to ensure that it resonates with the larger rhythms of a universe functioning in natural harmony with Confucian moral principles". According to Zongmi, heaven cannot be seen as a providential moral force due to the injustice and suffering found in the world.

== Writings ==
Zongmi's writings were extensive and influential. He wrote commentaries, ritual manuals, and popular essays for literati audiences. There is no certainty about the quantity of Zongmi's writings. Zongmi's epitaph, written by his student Pei Xiu, (787?–860) listed over ninety fascicles. Tsan-ning's (919–1001) biography claimed over two hundred.

For modern scholars, Zongmi provides the "most valuable sources on Tang dynasty Zen. There is no other extant source even remotely as informative". Unfortunately, many of Zongmi's works are lost, including his Collected Writings on the Source of Ch’an which would provide modern scholars with an invaluable source to reconstruct Tang dynasty Chan.

=== Work on the Sutra of Perfect Enlightenment ===
Zongmi's first major work was his commentary and sub-commentary on Sūtra of Perfect Enlightenment, completed in 823–824. The sub-commentary contains extensive data on the teachings, ideas and practices on the seven houses of Chan. These data are derived from personal experience and observations.

Zongmi also wrote a major work in eighteen fascicles called A Manual of Procedures for the Cultivation and Realization of Ritual Practice according to the Scripture of Perfect Enlightenment. In this work, Zongmi discusses the theoretical basis of Buddhist practice as well as the specific details of Buddhist practice. According to Gregory, the work is influenced by the writings of Zhiyi and explains a "complex program of ritual and meditation practice in terms of the Scripture of Perfect Enlightenment."

=== The Chart of Chan Succession ===
The Chart of the Master-Disciple Succession of the Chan Gate That Has Transmitted the Mind-Ground in China (Zhonghua chuan xindi Chanmen shizi chengxi tu 中華傳心地禪門師資承襲圖 Chung-hua ch'uan hsin-ti Ch'an-men shih-tzu ch'eng-hsi t'u), was written at the request of Pei Xiu sometime between 830 and 833. The work clarifies the major Chan traditions of the Tang era. It contains detailed critiques of the Northern School, the Ox-head School and the two branches of Southern Chan, the Hongzhou and his own Heze lineage.

=== The Chan Preface ===
The Prolegomenon to the Collection of Expressions of the Chan Source, also known as the Chan Preface, was written around 833. It provides a theoretical basis for Zongmi's vision of the correlation between Chan and the Buddhist scriptures. It gives accounts of the several lineages extant at the time, many of which had died out by the time of the Song dynasty (960–1279). This work was the preface to Collection of Expressions of the Chan Source, (Chan-yuan zhuquanji) which was a large collection of Chan texts that Zongmi compiled as a kind of Chan scriptural canon, i.e. a Chan pitaka (basket of scriptures). Unfortunately, this collection itself is lost, and only the Chan Preface exists.

=== On the Original Nature of Man ===
Zongmi's Inquiry into the Origin of Humanity, (or On the Original Nature of Man, or The Debate on an Original Person, Chinese: 原人論; Yuanren lun) was written sometime between 828 and 835. This essay became one of his best-known works and was popular with the literati of the time. The writing style is simple and straightforward, and the content not overly technical, making the work accessible to non-Buddhist intellectuals of the day. (Note: See Gregory, 1995, for an extended annotated translation and commentary and de Bary, 1972, for a translation and general comments.) The essay surveys the current major Buddhist teachings of the day, as well as Confucian and Taoist teachings, defending his Buddhist view as the most comprehensive of all. It develops a holistic and inclusive perspective of all the Buddhist and non-buddhist teachings, while also discussing the nature of existence and the human condition. De Bary writes that the essay may have been written as a kind of rejoinder to the On the original Nature of Man (Yuanren) and On the Tao (Yuandao) by the contemporary Confucian Han Yu (768–824).

=== Other commentaries ===
Zongmi also wrote the following works:

- Commentary on the Diamond Sutra
- Commentary on the Nirvana Sutra, probably written between 823 and 828.
- Commentary on the Chengweshilun
- Commentary on the Bianzong lun of Xie Lingyun
- Commentary on the Yulanpen Sutra

== Sources ==
- de Bary, William Theodore, Ed. (1972), On the Original Nature of Man. In: The Buddhist Tradition in India, China and Japan. Pages 179–196, Vintage Books, Random House, NY (Originally published by The Modern Library in 1969, ISBN 0-394-71696-5
- Broughton, Jeffrey (2004), Tsung-mi's Zen Prolegomenon: Introduction to an Exemplary Zen Canon. In: The Zen Canon: Understanding the Classic Texts. (Eds. S. Heine & D. S. Wright), Oxford & New York: Oxford University Press, ISBN 0-19-515068-6
- Broughton, Jeffrey (2009), Zongmi on Chan, New York: Columbia University Press, ISBN 978-0-231-14392-9
- Gregory, Peter N. (1991), Sudden Enlightenment Followed by Gradual Cultivation: Tsung-mi's Analysis of mind. In: Peter N. Gregory (editor)(1991), Sudden and Gradual. Approaches to Enlightenment in Chinese Thought, Delhi: Motilal Banarsidass Publishers Private Limited
- Gregory, Peter N. (1993), What Happened to the "Perfect Teaching"? Another look at Hua-yen Buddhist hermeneutics. In: Donald S. Lopez, Jr. (ed.)(1993), Buddhist Hermeneutics, Delhi: Motilal Banarsidass
- Gregory, Peter N. (1995), Inquiry into the Origin of Humanity: An Annotated Translation of Tsung-mi's Yüan jen lun with a Modern Commentary, University of Hawai’i Press, Kuroda Institute, ISBN 0-8248-1764-8
- Gregory, Peter N. (2002), Tsung-mi and the Sinification of Buddhism, University of Hawai’i Press, Kuroda Institute, (originally published Princeton University Press, 1991, Princeton, N.J.), ISBN 0-8248-2623-X
- Jan, Yun-hun (1981), The mind as the buddha-nature: The concept of the Absolute in Ch'an Buddhism
- Kapleau, Philip (1989), The three pillars of Zen
- Fischer-Schreiber, Elizabeth (1994), The encyclopedia of Eastern philosophy and religion: Buddhism, Hinduism, Taoism, Zen

== Bibliography ==
- Ainbinder, Lori Denise (1996). The man in the middle: an introduction to the life and work of Gui-feng Zong-mi, MA Thesis, The University of British Columbia
- Oh, Kang Nam (2000) The Taoist Influence on Hua-yen Buddhism: A Case of the Sinicization of Buddhism in China, Chung-Hwa Buddhist Journal, 13 (2), 277–297
- Shi, Hu (1953) Ch'an (Zen) Buddhism in China Its History and Method Philosophy East and West 3 (1), 3–24
