= Yongming Yanshou =

Chinese Chan Buddhist master (904–976)

Yongming Yanshou 永明延壽
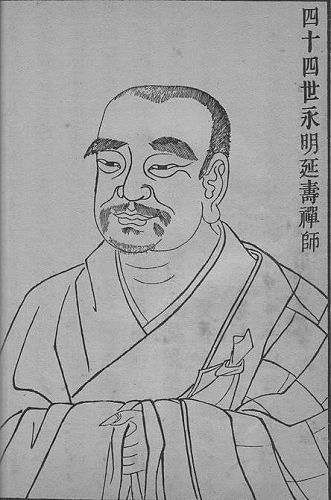
- Title: Chan master

Personal life
- Born: 904 Hangzhou or Yuhang
- Died: January 29, 976 (aged 71–72) Hangzhou

Religious life
- Religion: Buddhism
- School: Chan/Pure Land/Tiantai

Senior posting
- Teacher: Tiantai Deshao
- Predecessor: Tiantai Deshao

Yongming Yanshou (Chinese: 永明延壽; pinyin: Yǒngmíng Yánshòu; Wade–Giles: Yung-ming Yen-shou; Japanese: 永明延寿 or Yōmyō Enju; Korean: Yŏngmyŏng Yŏnsu; Vietnamese: Vĩnh Minh Diên Thọ) (904–976) was a prominent Buddhist monk during the Five Dynasties and Ten Kingdoms period and early Song Dynasty in China. He promoted a non-sectarian and inclusive Mahayana Buddhism, drawing on Chan, Huayan, Tiantai and Pure Land. Yanshou promoted a holistic and syncretic teaching which saw the sudden enlightenment focused practice of Chan as fully compatible with the myriad skillful means of Chinese Buddhism (such as rituals, bodhisattva precepts, worship, nianfo and cultivation of good deeds).

== Biography ==
Yongming Yanshou is first mentioned in biographical form by Zanning (贊寧) in a work called the Song Biographies of Eminent Monks (Chinese: 宋高僧傳; pinyin: song gaoseng zhuan), which was produced in 988, 12 years after Yanshou's death.

Yanshou lived largely during the Five Dynasties and Ten Kingdoms period, in the independent Wuyue kingdom. This age was characterized by nearly continuous warfare and political disorder. The future of Buddhism was especially uncertain during this time due to widespread suppression and sponsored destruction of temples. However, most of this activity took place in the north of China, while Yanshou resided in the independent Wuyue kingdom of the south, which was relatively stable during this time. Furthermore, unlike the trouble Buddhism faced in the north, the ruling Qian family heavily patronized Buddhist and other religious institutions.

He was born in either the capital city of Wuyue, modern-day Hangzhou, or a suburb of it, Yuhang, in the year 904. He would have served as an official before becoming a monk, although the exact nature of the position is disagreed upon in biographical sources. He probably became a monk around 932 under the Chan/Zen teacher Ts'ui Yen. At some point he left his initial teacher and went to Mount Tiantai, where his attainment was confirmed by the teacher Tiantai Dehshao. Around 952 he again moved, this time to Mount Xuedou (雪窦山), where he served as a teacher and apparently attracted many students. He is said to have practiced seated chanting and silent meditation.

In 960, the King of Wuyue, Qian Chu, assigned Yanshou to be the abbot of Lingyin Temple, which the king had recently re-established. Only a year later in 961, the king relocated Yanshou to the newly constructed Yongming Temple, from which he would take his name. Here Yanshou is said to have become very prominent. He received gifts from the King of Korea, Gwangjong of Goryeo, and in return he ordained 36 Korean monks, who then returned home to teach. In 974 he returned to Mount Tiantai, and the following year he died.

== Teaching ==
Yongming Yanshou is best known for promoting a synthesis of the diverse teachings of the Chinese Buddhist schools of his time, including Chan, Tiantai, Huayan, Weishi, and Pure Land. Yanshou held that scriptural study and Chan realization are not separate paths, and that Chan praxis was compatible with the study of scripture and Buddhist philosophy.

A major work of Yongming Yanshou is the massive one hundred fascicle Zongjìng lu (Record of the Source Mirror, 宗鏡錄 T.2016), which discusses Buddhist theory and practice by drawing on numerous influences from various schools and sutras. The work attempts to provide a holistic view of Mahayana Buddhism based on the underlying principle (zōng) of the One Mind (buddha-nature), which embraces and is the ground for all Chan practices, scriptural study, the practice of nianfo and ethical cultivation.

In this sprawling work, Yanshou quotes from numerous sources including various Chan patriarchs and texts, as well as the works of the Huayan, Tiantai, Chinese Madhyamaka, and Chinese Yogācāra schools. Yanshou provides an inclusive and syncretic view of Chan/Zen and Chinese Buddhism which includes all Chan lineages and all other Chinese Buddhist traditions. In his philosophical presentation, Yongming Yanshou is closely indebted to Huayan patriarchs like Zongmi and Chengguan.

According Welter, Yanshou was an inclusive and transsectarian “advocate of bodhisattva practice”, "whose main interest was promoting Mahayana Buddhism, free of sectarian intent." Unlike some other Chan Buddhists who rejected various aspects of ritual, study and worship, Yanshou saw Chan as encompassing all Mahayana practices. As such, he advocated the practice of Chan Buddhism along with the study of sutras and treatises and the many other Buddhist practices, writing:

Myriad good deeds [wanshan] are the provisions with which bodhisattvas enter sainthood; the assorted practices are gradual steps with which Buddhas assist [people] on the way [to enlightenment]. If one has eyes but no feet, how can one reach the pure, refreshing pond [i.e., nirvāṇa] If one obtains the truth but forgets expedients, how can one soar to the spontaneous, free land? On account of this, skillful means and prajñā-wisdom always assist each other; true emptiness and wondrous existence always complement each other. In the Lotus sūtra, the three vehicles are joined and unified with the one vehicle, just as the myriad good deeds all propel one toward enlightenment.

=== Pure land teaching ===
Yongming Yanshou is also famous for having taught the "dual-practice of Chan and Pure Land" (chanjing shuangxiu 禪淨雙修), holding that both practices assured one of Buddhahood much better than the practice of either on their own. Yanshou's Collection on the Convergence of All Virtues (Wanshan tonggui ji 萬善同歸集 T.2017). discusses some of his theories on Pure Land practice.

According to Yanshou, practices like chanting sutras, reciting the Buddha's name (nianfo) and cultivating merit do not contradict the goal of Chan (realizing one's true nature). This is based on his understanding of the non-obstruction of principle and phenomena (li-shi) as well as on the non-duality of essence-function. For Yanshou, while Chan seeks sudden awakening to the true nature of all things, it does not reject the conventional functioning of the essence, which includes all the myriad good deeds and religious practices. As such, there is no contradiction in practicing Chan and performing various good deeds like devotional practices.

Perhaps the most popular text which discusses Yongming Yanshou's view of "dual-practice" is a poem called “Four Alternatives” (si liao jian 四料揀):

Having Chan but lacking the Pure Land, nine out of ten will stray from the path; when the realm of the aggregates appears before them, they will instantly follow it.

Lacking Chan but having the Pure Land, ten thousand out of ten thousand who practice it will go [to rebirth]. Having seen Amitābha, why worry that one might not attain enlightenment?

Having both Chan and Pure Land, one is like a tiger with horns [i.e., doubly capable]. Such a person will be a teacher in the present life, and a buddha or patriarch in future lives.

Lacking both Chan and the Pure Land, it will be the iron beds and bronze pillars [of hell] for ten thousand kalpas and a thousand lives with no one to turn to.

Regarding Yanshou's teachings on nianfo (buddha recollection), they are mainly based on the Tiantai school's fourfold samadhi, which includes instructions on using nianfo during sitting meditation as well as for reciting the name while circumambulating a Buddha image. He also taught nianfo as part of the Tiantai Lotus Samādhi repentance ritual. For Yanshou, the Pure Land practice of nianfo was a skillful means which had to be practiced in the context of the bodhisattva precepts and the practice of myriad good deeds, including chan meditation. Nevertheless, as Welter writes, Yanshou saw nianfo as a subsidiary practice for ordinary people of lesser capacities, as indicated by the following passage from the Zongjing lu:

It [nianfo] is only for those who lack faith that their own mind is the Buddha and turn outward to rush around and seek [the Buddha]. For those with mediocre or inferior abilities, we provisionally make them contemplate the Buddha’s physical body to anchor wayward thoughts, using what is external to reveal what is internal. By and by, they awaken to their own minds. For those of superior ability, we make them contemplate the true form of the [Buddha’s] body. Contemplating the Buddha is thus like this. As it says in the Fozang jing 佛臧經 [Buddha Storehouse Scripture]: “To see the true form of the various dharmas is called seeing the Buddha.”

== Influence ==
Because he held views that conflicted with the later Linji Chan (Rinzai Zen) tradition (mainly the importance of scripture study for Chan/Zen and the practice of Pure Land nianfo as a provisional method), Yanshou was criticized and marginalized in many later accounts of Chan/Zen history, especially in Japanese Rinzai. As a result of this, he was largely ignored by Western scholars of Chan in the 20th century, most of whom worked from a Japanese perspective. Nonetheless, recent Western scholarship recognizes his importance, and he has been an enduring influential figure in the eyes of Chinese, Korean, and Vietnamese branches of Zen.

On the other hand, Yongming Yanshou became deeply revered in the Chinese Pure Land tradition as a Pure Land patriarch. The promotion of Yanshou as a Pure Land master begins with the Longshu Jingtu Wen (1160). Over time, the view of Yanshou as a Pure Land master became quite popular in Chinese Buddhism. According to Welter, there are two main reasons that Yanshou was attractive to Pure Land Buddhists. First, he was a learned scholar and Chan master who promoted a broad array of traditional practices (many of whom are also Pure Land practices), like reciting the Buddha's name, chanting sutras, worship and so on. Second, Yanshou spent much time in Tiantai mountain and wrote on Tiantai topics, and it was Tiantai scholars who first began to write of Pure Land Buddhism as its own school.

== Sources ==
- Benn, James A (2007), Burning for the Buddha, University of Hawaii Press, pp. 104–131. ISBN 0824823710
- Welter, Albert (2011). Yongming Yanshou's Conception of Chan in the Zongjing Lu: A Special Transmission Within the Scriptures, Oxford University Press, ISBN 978-0-19-976031-2
- Wu, Zhongwei (2007), "The mind as the essence of words: A linguistic philosophical analysis of the classification teaching of Yongming Yanshou". Frontiers of Philosophy in China 2 (3), 336–344 JSTOR 27823298
