= Qingliang Chengguan =

Qingliang Chengguan (Chinese: 澄觀; pinyin: Chéngguān; Korean: Jinggwan; Japanese: Chōgan, 738–839 or 737-838 CE), was an important scholar-monk and patriarch of the Huayan school of Chinese Buddhism also known as Huayan pusa (bodhisattva Avatamsaka) and Qingliang Guoshi (Imperial Preceptor "Clear and Cool", Clear and Cool is a name for Mount Wutai).

Chengguan is most widely known for his extensive commentaries and sub-commentaries to the Avataṃsaka Sūtra (Huayan jing), as well as for his translation of a new Gandhavyuha sutra version, together with the Indian monk Prajña. Chengguan's commentaries on the Avataṃsaka quickly became one of the authoritative sources for Huayan doctrine. Chengguan lived through the reigns of nine emperors and was an honored teacher to seven emperors starting with Xuanzong (玄宗) until Wenzong (文宗). Chengguan was also the teacher of the influential Huayan patriarch Zongmi.

== Life ==
Chengguan was a native of Yuezhou Shanyin (modern day Shaoxing, Zhejiang province). At the age of 11, he left home and became a novice at Baolin Monastery (寶林寺) in Benzhou (本州). At the age of 20 (in 757 CE), he became a fully ordained monk under Tanyi (曇一, 692-771) and took bodhisattva precepts under Changzhao (常照). Around 758 CE, he practiced at the renowned Qixia Monastery (棲霞寺) in Runzhou (present-day Zhengjiang) in Jiangsu Province. His teacher there was the Vinaya master Li (醴律师, Li lüshi).

Chengguan traveled through central, western, and northern China, studying numerous works under various Buddhist teachers. He also visited Jinling (modern-day Nanjing), where he studied the teachings of the "Three Treatise School" under the master Xuanbi (玄璧). During the reign of Emperor Daizong (762–779), he stayed at Waguan Temple (瓦官寺) in present-day Nanjing, Jiangsu Province. There, he studied two important Mahayana texts: the Awakening Faith in the Mahāyāna and the Mahayana Mahaparanirvana Sutra. He also traveled to Qiantang (current area around Hangzhou, Zhejiang Province), staying at Tianzhu Monastery (天竺寺), and dedicating himself to the practice and study of Huayan, the Avatamsaka Sutra and Fazang's commentaries.

His biography also mentions that he practiced Chan under Wutaia Wuming (722–793) of the Heze school of Heze Shenhui (670–762). Between 775 and 776 CE, Chengguan was also a student of Jingxi Zhanran (711–782), the great reviver of the Tiantai school with whom Chengguan studied the Lotus and Vimalakirti sutras. Chengguan also practiced Chan in two other schools: under Huizhong (慧忠, 683–769) and Faqin (法欽, 714–792) of the "Ox-Head School," as well as under Huiyun (慧 雲, dates unknown), a disciple of Laoshan Yifu from the "Northern School. He was also learned in non-Buddhist subjects such as various Chinese philosophical classics, history, philology, the siddham script, Indian philosophy, the four Vedas, the five sciences, mantras, and rituals.

However, Chengguan's primary focus was on the Avatamsaka Sutra and Huayan studies. Chengguan studied Huayan under Fashen (法詵 718–778), who was a student of the Huiyuan (慧遠, 673–743), a disciple of Fazang. Chengguan soon became known among elite circles as an erudite intellectual who lectured and commented on the Avataṃsaka Sūtra.

In 776 CE Chengguan returned to the sacred mountain of Wutaishan (believed to be the abode of Manjusri), where he stayed for the next 15 years. He resided at Huayan Monastery (華嚴寺), where the monks built a pavilion for him to write his works. Between 784 and 787 CE, Chengguan wrote his commentaries on Śikṣānanda's new eighty fascicle translation of the Avatamsaka sutra, which was completed in 799 CE. In the same year, Emperor Dezong granted Chengguan the title of Calm and Cool Imperial Teacher (Qingliang Guoshi). After completing the new translation of the Gandhavyuha, Emperor Dezong asked Chengguan to clarify the main concepts of the Avatamsaka. In 796 CE, he was invited by Emperor Dezong to Chang'an to participate in the translation of the Gandhavyuha sutra with the Indian master Prajña (般若; 734–c. 810. Emperor Dezong was so pleased with Chengguan that he awarded him a purple robe and the title of "Master of Buddhist Teachings" (jiaoshou heshang). Chengguan received numerous honorary titles: Master of the Purple Robe (796), Imperial Teacher (guoshi) (799), Monastic Professor (da senglu), Chief Monk (sengtong), and Dharma Master Qingliang (795).

In 810 CE, former Emperor Xianzong (r. 805–806) summoned him and asked for an explanation of the term "dharmadhatu." After this meeting, Chengguan was appointed as sengtong ("monastic supervisor"). He was a respected teacher by all emperors; there were nine emperors during his lifetime, and he taught seven of them.

Chengguan was also a serious Buddhist practitioner. According to Guo Cheen, he maintained various self-determined vows including "always keeping his sash and alms bowl by his side, avoiding looking at women, avoiding visits to laypeople’s homes, never lying down to sleep, abandoning any fame or fortune, regularly reciting the Lotus Sūtra, regularly teaching on the Avataṃsaka Sūtra, regularly studying Mahāyāna texts, and never ceasing to be compassionate in an attempt to help all beings." The Song Biographies of Preeminent Monks and A Brief Account of the Five Patriarchs of Huayan School offer two specific sets of his ten vows that are equal in rigor but with slight variations.

== Thought ==
=== Doctrinal issues ===
Chengguan's thought attempts to follow Fazang's thought closely. Due to this, Chengguan criticized Huiyuan (Fazang's student) for not adhering to Fazang's teachings closely enough. For example, Huiyuan modified Fazang's system of doctrinal classification (panjiao). This system divided all Buddhist teachings into five: Hīnayāna teaching, Elementary Mahāyāna teaching (Madhyamaka and Yogacara), Final Mahayana (Buddha nature teachings, Awakening of Faith), Sudden (Vimalakirti sutra) and Perfect Teaching (the Huayan One Vehicle). Huiyuan included Confucianism and Daoism into this system. But Chengguan criticized Huiyuan and those who saw Taoism and Confucianism part of Buddhism's doctrinal system. Huiyuan had also rejected the idea that the Sudden teaching belonged in a doctrinal classification system, since the sudden teaching is based on utter silence and thus it has no doctrinal content, instead it is merely a statement about the inexpressibility of ultimate truth. Chengguan also criticized this view, seeing the "Sudden teaching" as a proper doctrine of its own.

=== Syncretism ===
Chengguan developed Huayan thought in new directions by drawing on various Buddhist schools including various Chan schools, Xuanzang's Weishi and Tiantai. Sources on Chengguan's life, like Peixiu's epitaph, mention his prolific studies of various Chinese Buddhist traditions and texts, including numerous Mahayana sutras, Huayan, the works of the Yogacara school (Yogacarabhumi and Chengweishilun), the Sanlun school, various Chan masters, and the works of Zhiyi (such as the Mohezhiguan), Daosheng and Sengzhao.

Chengguan often integrates the perspectives of these other traditions in his Huayan commentaries. For example, while Fazang generally criticized the Weishi school of Xuanzang, Chengguan often relies on and quotes Xuanzang's Cheng weishi lun (成唯識論; Demonstration of Consciousness-only; T. 1585). Chengguan also interpreted the Sudden division of Fazang's doctrinal schema as referring to the teachings of Chan Buddhism (while Fazang merely saw it as referring to the teaching of Vimalakirti). According to Chengguan, Chan teachings teach how the mind is Buddha and transmit this wisdom through non-verbal methods. As such, Chengguan seems to have highly respected the teachings of Chan Buddhism, seeing it as only second to Huayan. Furthermore, in his sub-commentaries, Chengguan says that his work relies on "integrating the Chan practices of both the Southern and Northern schools" and "folding-in the mystical intents of Tientai and the Three Contemplations of Nanyue." This indicates that Chengguan was conscious about his syncretic tendencies.

Regarding the Chan Buddhist influences, while Chengguan draws on the sources of Northern, Southern and Oxhead Chan schools, he did not consider himself as belonging to any of these, instead claiming that he was from the "school of mind" (xinzong, 心宗). As such, while he was influenced by Chan, Yoshizu Yoshihide argues that Chengguan should not be seen as being associated with any Chan school per se, and instead he should be seen as a Huayan master who drew on and evaluated various Chan sources. Chengguan was also highly critical of Chan masters who ignored or disparaged the doctrinal study of Mahayana scriptures.

Chengguan also draws on Confucian and Daoist sources in his work, though he is clear that this is merely a skillful means and that he sees these teachings as inferior to Buddhism. As such, he said that he was "borrowing their words but not adopting their meaning."

=== The Fourfold Dharmadhatus ===
Chengguan's main unique contribution to Huayan thought is the theory of the fourfold Dharmadhatu or four Dharmadhatus (四法界; sifajie). This theory is found in Chengguan's Meditative Perspectives on the Huayan Dharmadhatu (華嚴法界觀門; Huayan Fajie Guanmen). The Dharmadhatu is the ultimate reality that must be known by the bodhisattva and the four dharmadhatus are four ways of understanding ultimate truth.

The four dharmadhātu are:

1. The dharmadhātu of phenomena (事法界; shi fajie), which is the view in which all dharmas are seen as particular separate phenomena (事; shi) and which is to be seen as like an illusion. In the widely used Huayan metaphor of the water and the waves, the phenomena are symbolized by the waves.
2. The dharmadhātu of principle (理法界; li fajie) which sees all phenomena as arising from li (理, the ultimate principle), which is "emptiness", the “One Mind” (一心; yi xin) and Buddha nature, it is the source or origin of all dharmas as well as the immutable nature of all dharmas, the ultimate essence of all things. It is the non-dual and transcendental Absolute according to Guo Cheen. In the metaphor of the water and the waves, the principle / essence is symbolized by water.
3. The dharmadhātu of the non-obstruction of principle and phenomena (理事無礙法界; lishi wu’ai fajie) this is the interpenetration and interfusion of all phenomena and the ultimate principle, the pure source / essence. In the metaphor of the water and the waves, this level is symbolized by how waves are water.
4. The dharmadhātu of the non-obstruction of [all] phenomena (事事無礙法界; shishi wu’ai fajie), which refers to the perfect interfusion of all phenomena with each other. While all things are perfectly interfused, they also do not lose their particularity. Since all phenomena share the same ultimate source, they are interconnected and interpenetrating. In the water-wave metaphor, this is symbolized by how all waves are connected due to being part of the same ocean.

According to Imre Hamar, while Fazang emphasized the non-obstruction and interfusion of all dharmas, Chengguan stressed the non-obstruction of principle and phenomena. Hamar writes that "according to his interpretation, this common source (which is the One Mind, the pure source) makes possible the interrelated existence of all phenomena."

== Works ==
=== Sutra Commentaries ===
Chengguan was an esteemed monk revered for his commentarial literature authoritative during his time and throughout later generations in East Asia. Chengguan authored over thirty works. The most important of his writings are A Commentary on the *Mahāvaipulya Buddhāvataṃsaka-sūtra (Da Fangguang Fo Huayanjing Shu 大方廣佛華嚴經疏 T. 1735) and A Record of the Explanation on the Meaning of the Commentary on the Mahāvaipulya Buddhāvataṃsaka-sūtra (Da Fangguang Fo Huayanjing Shu Yanyi Chao 大方廣佛華嚴經隨疏演義鈔 T. 1736). His initial commentary was seen as difficult and so his further comments and elaborations were collected by his disciples Sengrui (僧睿), Zhikai (智愷), and others as a sub-commentary. After Chengguan completed the new translation of the Gaṇḍavyūha-sūtra in 798 along with the Indian Prajña, he also composed a commentary to this, titled Zhenyuan xinyi Huayan jing shu (貞元新譯華嚴經疏, X. 227, A New Commentary on the Huayan jing written during the Zhenyuan period).

Chengguan's commentaries are among the most complex and detailed Chinese Buddhist sutra commentaries. It contains a detailed introduction called the “profound discussion” (xuantan [玄談]), a sophisticated structural analysis of the sutra (the kepan [科判]) and a close explanation of the sutra's contents, sentence by sentence. In his commentary on the Avatamsaka, Chengguan cites from over 300 Buddhist texts, making it a kind of doctrinal summa or encyclopedia of Buddhist doctrine. He also cites Chinese classics as well.

=== Other texts ===
Chengguan also wrote various other shorter texts, some of the most important being:

- Thematic Essentials of the Huayan jing (華嚴經綱要)
- Analysis of the Five Aggregates (五蘊觀)
- Sansheng yuanrong guanmen (三聖圓融觀門; Contemplations of the Perfect Interfusion of the Three Holy Ones, T. 1882) which teaches on the interfused nature of Samantabhadra, Mañjuśrī, and Vairocana.
- Huayan xinyao famen (華嚴心要法門; The Essence of the Huayan Mind, X. 1005), written to answer questions by Emperor Shunzong (順宗; r. 805). Zongmi wrote a commentary to this. It is also included in the Jingde chuandeng lu (景德傳燈錄, T. 2076; Record of the transmission of the lamp from the Jingde period).
- Huayan fajie xuanjing (華嚴法界玄鏡; The mystical mirror of the Huayan Dharmadhātu, T. 1883), a commentary on Dushun's Huayan fajie guanmen (華嚴法界觀門; Discernment of the Dharmadhātu). It has been translated by Thomas Cleary.
- Xinyi Huayan jing qi chu jiu hui song shizhang (新譯華嚴經七處九 會頌釋章; Poems of the seven locations and nine meetings of the new translation of the Huayan jing and their explanation, T. 1738).

=== Editions of his commentaries ===
In the eleventh century, Jinshui Jingyuan 淨源 (1011-1088 CE) became known as the first editor to merge Chengguan’s Commentaries into each line of the 80 fascicle Chinese Avatamsaka Sutra, resulting in the publication that is the Exegesis on the Commentaries to the Avataṃsaka Sūtra (Huayanjing Shu Zhu, 華嚴經疏注).

The sub-commentaries remained a separate publication. Preeminent commentators of Yuan and Ming continued to annotate, study, and lecture on Chengguan’s commentaries. In the Ming Dynasty, Miaoming (妙明) compiled Chengguan’s Commentaries and Subcommentaries into one publication for the first time. They did not mesh well, however, because Chengguan’s Outline to the Commentaries to the Avataṃsaka Sūtra (Huayanjing Shu Kewen 華嚴經疏科文) was still missing.

In 1912, laymen Xu Weiru 徐蔚如 (1878-1937 CE) and others edited Chengguan’s Commentaries and sub-commentaries based on a version of the Outline to the Commentaries to the Huayanjing that survived the Chinese persecutions by being in hiding in Japan. In 1936, an edition of the Avatamsaka, the commentary and sub-commentary edited by Chiang Tsu Chuang (將竹莊) was published in Shanghai. Since then, more than 20 editions of compilations combining the Avataṃsaka Sūtra, Chengguan’s Commentaries and sub-commentaries based on his Outline have been disseminated. Different versions of the Chinese Tripiṭaka have selected to include different editions and portions of these compilations. More recently, the Xinxiu Huayan jing shuchao (新修華嚴經疏鈔, 20 volumes) a revised edition of this work led by Chengyi (成一), was published by the Huayan Society (華嚴蓮社) in Taibei between 2001 and 2004.

== Sources ==
- Chengguan; Guo Cheen (2014), Translating totality in parts: Chengguan's commentaries and subcommentaries to the Avatamska Sutra, Lanham: University Press of America.
- Girard, F. (2003), Review: Imre Hamar: A Religious Leader in the Tang: Chengguan's Biography, Bulletin de l'École française d'Extrême-Orient, 90 (1), 552-556.
- Hamar, Imre (2002). A Religious Leader in the Tang: Chengguan’s Biography, Tokyo: The International Institute of Buddhist Studies, ISBN 4-906267-49-1
- Hamar, Imre (1999). Buddhism and The Dao in Tang China: The Impact of Confucianism and Daoism on the Philosophy of Chengguan. Acta Orientalia Hung. 52, (3-4), pp. 283–292.
