= Sutra of Perfect Enlightenment =

Sutra in Mahāyāna Buddhism

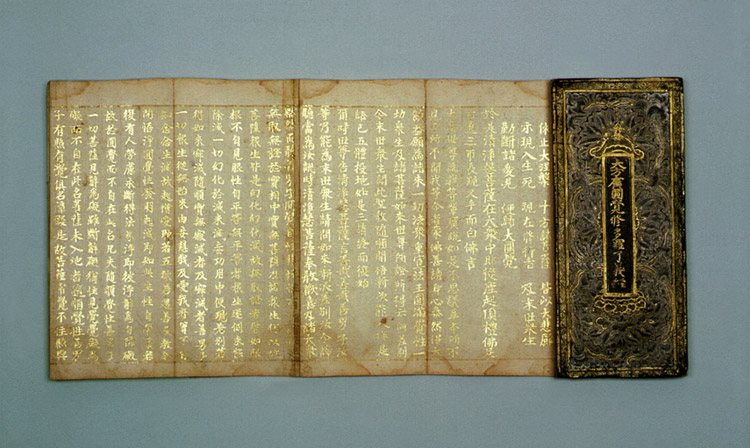
The Complete Enlightenment Sutra, gold on oak paper

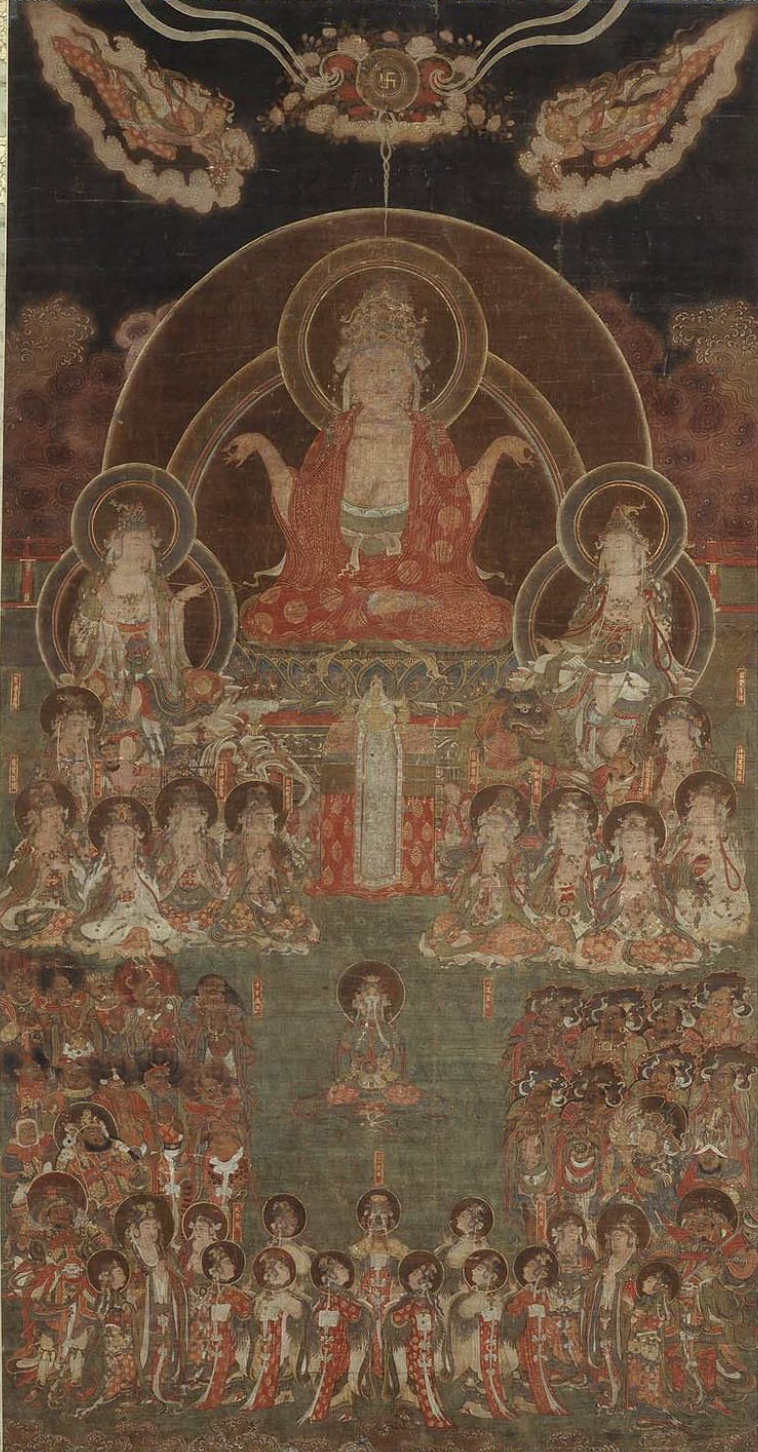
Illustration for the sutra, Korea, 14th century

The Sutra of Perfect Enlightenment or Complete Enlightenment (traditional Chinese: 圓覺經; simplified Chinese: 圆觉经; pinyin: Yuánjué jīng; Japanese: 円覚経; rōmaji: Engaku-kyō; Korean: 원각경; romaja: Wongakgyeong; Vietnamese: kinh Viên Giác) is a Mahāyāna Buddhist sūtra (Note: Also translated as The Scripture on Fully Perfected Enlightenment and Sutra of Perfect Awareness; 1 fasc. (T 842.17.913a-922a)) highly esteemed by both the Huayan and Chan/Zen schools.

Divided into twelve chapters as a series of discussions on meditation practice, this text deals with issues such as the meaning and origin of ignorance, sudden and gradual enlightenment, original Buddhahood, etc. these themes were also elucidated in the Awakening of Faith. It was intended to resolve questions regarding doctrine and meditation for the earliest practitioners of the Chan school. One of the most important and important commentaries written on it is the 9th-century Great Exegesis on the Sutra of Complete Enlightenment (圓覺經大疏鈔 Yuanjuejing Dashuchao) by the Huayan Patriarch Guifeng Zongmi (圭峰宗密, 780–841).

== Titles ==
Its full Chinese title: Dà fāngguăng yuánjué xiūduōluó liǎoyì jīng (大方廣圓覺修多羅了義經, lit. 'the Great Vaipulya (Corrective & Expansive) Sutra on the Perfect Enlightenment and (the Sutra) Joyful Cultivation of the Thorough Understanding' (Note: Duōluó (多羅) is a transcription of the first syllable of prasanna, meaning ‘to joyfully seek’. A nītārtha (了義 liǎoyì) sutra aims to reveal an exhaustive and unbiased array of teaching.)).

Its reconstructed title in Sanskrit is Mahāvaipulya pūrṇabuddha-sūtra prasannārtha-sūtra. (Note: That sūtra appears twice in the title is not a typo, and this repetition has been remarked as peculiar by scholars.)

== History ==
Its translation into Chinese is traditionally attributed to Buddhatrāta, an Indian or Kashmiri monk otherwise unattested in history, who translated the work from Sanskrit in 693 in the White Horse Temple of Luoyang. Some scholars, however, believe it to be Chinese in origin and written in the late 7th or early 8th century CE.

== Summary ==
The Sutra of Perfect Enlightenment is arranged in twelve chapters, plus a short introductory section. The introductory section describes the scene of the sermon and lists the major participants. The location is a state of deep meditative concentration (samadhi) and the participants are the Buddha and one hundred thousand great Bodhisattvas, among whom twelve eminent Bodhisattvas act as spokesmen. Each one of the twelve gets up one by one and asks the Buddha a set of questions about doctrine, practice and enlightenment. The structure of the sutra is such that the most "essential" and suddenistic discussions occur in the earlier chapters and the more "functional" and gradualistic dialogues occur later.

This kind of structure reflects a motif associated with the doctrine of the Huayan school, which affirms that the Buddha delivered the abstruse Avatamsaka Sutra (華嚴經 ‘Huayan Scripture’) as his first sermon, in an effort to directly awaken those whose "roots of virtue" were well-matured. The terminology that Zongmi and Gihwa use to describe these advanced practitioners is that they possess the capacity for the teaching of "sudden enlightenment"; a direct awakening to the non-duality of reality, which necessarily precludes gradualist, "goal-oriented" practice. In the first two chapters (the chapters of Mañjuśrī and Samantabhadra), the Buddha holds very strictly to the sudden position, denying the possibility of enlightenment through gradual practice. In the third chapter he begins to allow for a bit of a gradual view, and the next several chapters become mixtures of the two. The final few chapters offer a fully gradualist perspective.

Gihwa's primary means of categorization of the chapters is according to the "three capacities" of practitioners: superior, middling and inferior. According to Gihwa, the first three chapters are aimed at those of superior capacity, the next seven for those of middling capacity and the final two for those of inferior capacity. However, this method of categorization does not necessarily mean that the later chapters become gradually easier to read and understand. In fact some of the most difficult discussions come in the later chapters. Most notable in this regard is the discussion of the "four traces" of Self, Person, Sentient Being and Life in Chapter Nine. Since the distinction between each of these four is extremely subtle, and the wording of the text itself is not that clear, this turns out to be one of the most difficult chapters to digest.

== Bibliography ==
- Muller, A. Charles. The Sūtra of Perfect Enlightenment: Korean Buddhism's Guide to Meditation. Albany: SUNY Press, 1999.
- Gregory, Peter N.; trans. (2005). The Sutra of Perfect Enlightenment. In: Apocryphal Scriptures, Berkeley, Numata Center for Buddhist Translation and Research, ISBN 1-886439-29-X, pp. 43–133
