= Awakening of Faith in the Mahayana =

Popular Sastra in Mahāyāna Buddhism

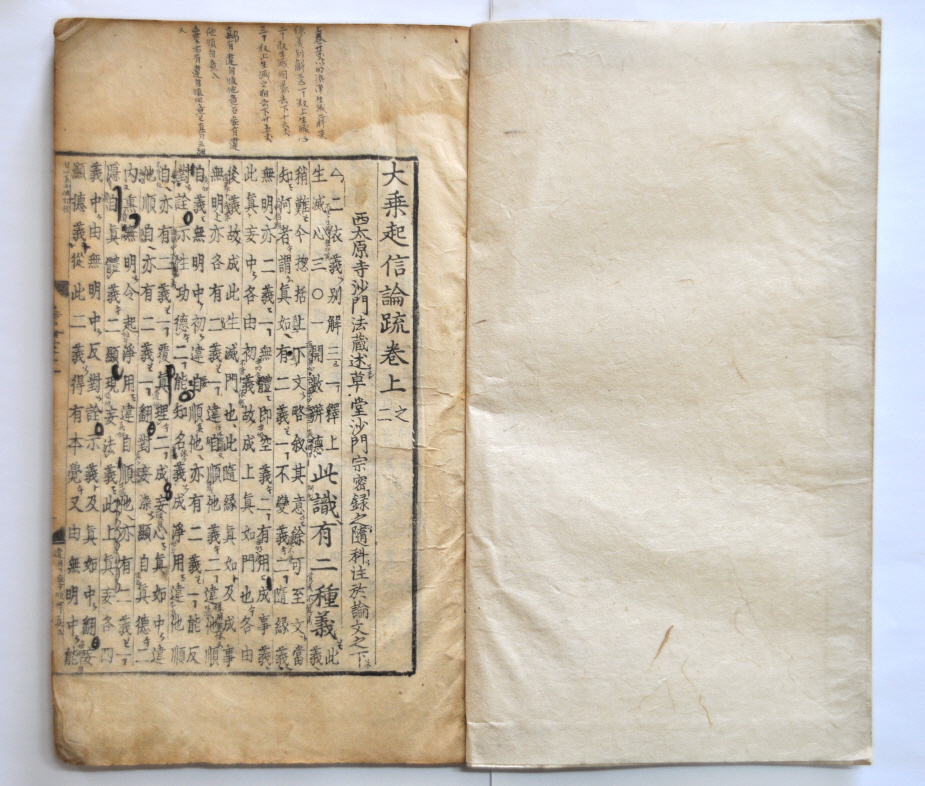
A page of Wŏnhyo's Commentary on the Awakening of Faith

Awakening of Faith in the Mahāyāna (AF, Chinese: 大乘起信論; pinyin: Dàshéng Qǐxìn Lùn; Japanese: 大乗起信論, Daijōkishinron; Korean: 대승기신론, Daeseung-gisinron; Vietnamese: Đại thừa khởi tín luận, reconstructed Sanskrit title: *Mahāyāna-śraddhotpāda-śāstra) is an influential Mahayana Buddhist treatise for East Asian Buddhism, notable for its doctrine of "one mind and two aspects."

Though traditionally attributed to the 2nd century CE Indian master Aśvaghoṣa, no Sanskrit version is extant and it is widely regarded by many contemporary scholars as having been composed in China. The main theories of the authorship of the Awakening of Faith among contemporary scholars now point to either the 6th century Indian monk translators Paramārtha and Bodhiruci, or alternatively to one of their Chinese students.

== Origin and authorship ==
While the text is traditionally attributed to Aśvaghoṣa, no Sanskrit version of the text is extant. The two earliest existing versions are written in Chinese, and contemporary scholars widely accept the theory that the text was composed in China.

As Alex Gardner notes, there is still scholarly debate on whether the work was composed in Sanskrit by an Indian, or whether it was composed in Chinese. Some scholars point to Chinese theories in the text, while others (like Jikidō Takasaki) see it as mainly drawing on classic Indian ideas found in the Indic tathāgatagarbha texts like the Ratnagotravibhāga.

Some scholars note that the AF could have an Indic precedent or at least be based on several Indian ideas. According to Christopher Callahan "the literary quality of the text suggests that its origins are not entirely Chinese". This is because:

In comparison with other forged translations, the Qixinlun does not quote from known translations and has no known allusions to Taoist or Confucian texts. Moreover, the text is written in an extremely concise manner without literary embellishment, out of keeping with the ornate pianliti style that was popular in the sixth century. This evidence has led many scholars to conjecture that some form of the text was produced in either India or Central Asia and that the author or authors, perhaps even Paramārtha himself, rewrote the text in light of sixth-century Chinese intellectual concerns.

D.T. Suzuki accepted the Indian origin of the Awakening of Faith (though he did not think Aśvaghoṣa was the author). He saw the text as being "inspired by the same spirit" as the Lankavatara, Avatamsaka, and Mahayanamahaparanirvana Sutras, and regarded its identification as a Chinese text as "not well grounded".

Paramārtha (Chinese: 真諦; 499–569) an Indian monk who became a translator in China, was traditionally thought to have translated the text in 553 CE. However, some modern scholars opine it was composed by Paramārtha or one of his students. This thesis was defended by Japanese scholars like Hiroo Kashiwagi Sally B. King also writes that Paramārtha may have composed the Buddha-nature Treatise (Chinese: 佛性論) as well as the Awakening of Faith. (Note: On these points, King cites Philosophy of Mind in Sixth-Century China: Paramartha's 'Evolution of Consciousness' , Diana Y. Paul, 1984, Stanford University Press.)

Other experts dispute that it has anything to do at all with Paramārtha. Keng Ching argues that the Awakening of Faith does not show any similarities with the other works of Paramārtha, and he notes the doctrinal differences between the works of Paramārtha's the Dilun school and the Awakening of Faith. Keng Ching also argues that the attribution of the AF to Paramārtha was mainly due to the efforts of the Shelun scholar Tanqian (曇遷; 542–607).

The authors of a recent translation of the AF (John Jorgensen, Dan Lusthaus, John Makeham, and Mark Strange) write that "there is now wide consensus that the author of the Treatise was strongly influenced by the terminology and language of Bodhiruci (d. ca. 535)." The Awakening of Faith draws on much of the ideas and specific terms found in Bodhiruci's translations, such as his Laṅkāvatāra-sūtra and his translation of Vasubandhu's Commentary on the Ten Stages Sutra. As such "one theory is that the Treatise was written by someone in Bodhiruci’s circle." According to these authors, one candidate for the authorship of the Awakening of Faith is Tanlin (曇 林), who was "an amanuensis of Bodhiruci and a scholar of Tathāgatagarbha material."

A later translation or reedited version was attributed to the Khotanese monk Śikṣānanda (Chinese: 實叉難陀; active 695–700). This version was edited and modified to make it more compatible with classic Yogacara doctrine of the school of Xuanzang which had been critical of the Awakening of Faith. But this new edition was never as popular as the earlier version of the Awakening of Faith, which was defended by the Huayan scholar and Sanskritist Fazang (643–712). Fazang himself had worked with Śikṣānanda's translation team on other sutras, like the Lankavatara.

When it was discovered by Westerners at the beginning of the 20th century in 1907, Welsh missionnary Timothy Richard interpreted The Awakening of Faith in the Mahayana Doctrine as a crypto-Christian text and new form of Buddhism.

== Title ==
The term Mahayana points not to the Mahayana school, but to tathatā "suchness" or "the Absolute":

The title of the text, the Awakening of Faith in the Mahayana, should therefore be understood as the "Awakening of Faith in the Absolute", not in Mahayana Buddhism as distinguished from Hinayana Buddhism.

Charles Muller argues that the terminology "faith in" is misleading:

In rendering the title of the Dasheng qixin lun as Awakening of Mahāyāna Faith, as opposed to Hakeda's "Awakening of Faith in Mahāyāna" I am following the position put forth by Sung Bae Park in Chapter Four of his book Buddhist Faith and Sudden Enlightenment. There he argues that the inner discourse of the text itself, along with the basic understanding of the meaning of mahāyāna in the East Asian Buddhist tradition does not work according to a Western theological "faith in..." subject-object construction, but according to an indigenous East Asian essence-function 體用 model. Thus, mahāyāna should not be interpreted as a noun-object, but as a modifier, which characterizes the type of faith.

In other words, the treatise is not discussing "Faith in the Mahayana," rather it is presenting the Mahayana style of faith, which is faith in the true suchness of mind or the "One Mind". If this is accurate then a more apt title would be The Awakening of Mahāyāna Faith.

Sung Bae Park observes, following Wŏnhyo, that "Mahāyāna" in the title does not refer to the object of faith, but to essence, i.e. the One Mind, while faith is its function. Accordingly, Park explains that the title "in the final analysis, comes to mean simply 'the naturally functioning mind' or 'the properly operating mind,' which, in effect, is the 'mind of faith.'"

== Content ==
Written from the perspective of Essence-Function (simplified Chinese: 体用; traditional Chinese: 體用; pinyin: tǐyòng) philosophy, this text sought to harmonize the two soteriological philosophies of the Buddha-nature (tathagatagarbha) and the Eight Consciousnesses of Yogacara into a synthetic vision based on the "One Mind in Two Aspects" doctrine. According to Whalen Lai, this doctrine holds that "self and world, mind and suchness, are integrally one. Everything is a carrier of that a priori enlightenment; all incipient enlightenment is predicated on it." Paul Williams explains the main teaching of the Awakening of Faith thus:

The Awakening of Faith itself takes the tathagatagarbha as the substratum of samsara and nirvana. This Mind has two aspects – the Mind as Suchness or Thusness, that is, the Absolute Reality itself, and the Mind as phenomena. Between them these two aspects embrace all there is.

The text is divided into five sections, and often summarized as “One Mind, Two Aspects, Three Greatnesses, Four Faiths, and Five Practices". Following two introductory chapters dealing with the oneness of mind and motivations for the text's composition, part three focuses on two aspects of mind to clarify the relationship between enlightenment and ignorance, nirvana and samsara, or the absolute and the phenomenal. Part four describes five practices that aid in the growth of faith, emphasizing calmness and insight meditation. Part five describes the benefits that result from cultivating the five practices.

=== One Mind and two aspects ===
According to the Awakening of Faith, the principle of the Mahāyāna is "the Mind of the sentient being" which includes within it all phenomenal and transcendental states. This is explained in terms of the One Mind which has two aspects: [1] the aspect of suchness, and [2] the aspect of birth-and-death. These two aspects mutually include each other and embace all dharmas, or states of existence.

==== The aspect of suchness ====
Suchness refers to the essential nature of mind which is unborn and imperishable. This nature is beyond language and characteristics, as all verbal explanations are merely provisional and used in connection with illusions. Accordingly, the word "suchness" is explained as "the limit of verbalization wherein a word is used to put an end to words." Regarding this, Wŏnhyo comments that, "It is just as though one stops the voices with a voice," while Fazang states, "It is just like saying 'Be quiet!' If this voice were not there, other voices would not be made to cease."

Though ultimately beyond characteristics, when elaborated upon in words, suchness can be said to possess two senses: [1] emptiness and [2] non-emptiness. In terms of its being empty, it is said that suchness is dissociated from deluded thoughts of the discriminating mind which conceive of things in terms of existing, not existing, both existing and not existing, and neither existing nor not existing; as well as in terms of sameness, difference, both, and neither. As for its non-emptiness, having established that the essence of all dharmas is devoid of illusions (on the basis of emptiness), it is said that the true mind possesses its own intrinsic reality which is replete with pure and untainted qualities. It is eternal, permanent, immutable, pure, and self-sufficient. It transcends thoughts and is in harmony with enlightenment.

==== The aspect of birth-and-death ====
The mind of birth-and-death is grounded on the tathāgatagarbha, or buddha-nature, and refers to the ālayavijñāna, or storehouse consciousness. This is explained as that in which "neither-birth-nor-death" (nirvāṇa) combines harmoniously with "birth-and-death" (samsāra) in such a way that the two are neither the same nor different. The text states:

This consciousness has two aspects that embrace all states of existence and create all states of existence. They are: 1) the aspect of enlightenment, and 2) the aspect of nonenlightenment.

Enlightenment is further divided into two categories: [1] original enlightenment, and [2] the process of actualization of enlightenment. The former means that the essence of mind is grounded on the dharmakāya (the formless buddha-body), while the latter refers to a sentient being's process of integration with that original enlightenment.

=== Permeation of ignorance and suchness ===
According to the Awakening of Faith, ignorance permeates into and perfumes (vāsanā) suchness, causing a deluded consciousness to arise. At the same time, suchness also permeates into ignorance, causing beings to loathe samsāra and believe in their essential nature. Through this, beings come to know that the world of objects is nonexistent and accordingly take up practices to free themselves. Regarding the mutual perfuming of suchness and ignorance, the text states: "As for the meaning of perfuming, just like clothes, in the context of everyday life, though in fact odorless, if perfumed by incense, become fragrant. Similarly, the pure Suchness, though in reality devoid of contamination, simply due to the perfuming of ignorance, appears contaminated. Moreover, ignorance, an impure factor and in fact empty of pure activity, simply due to the perfuming of Suchness, becomes effective in pure activities."

The Awakening of Faith further distinguishes between two types of permeation into ignorance by suchness: "permeation through manifestation of the essence [of suchness]," and "permeation through [external] influences." Regarding the former, Yoshito Hakeda comments:

The phrase, “the permeation through manifestation of the essence [of suchness],” can perhaps be rendered literally as “the permeation through manifestation of essence on its own accord.” Following Fazang's comment, this permeation has traditionally been understood as “internal permeation” (Ch., neixun). It is the inner urge of suchness in human beings to emerge, so to speak, from the state of unawareness to the state of awareness, or from the unconscious to the conscious. It is an internal movement of suchness within, from potential to actual, or from essence to existence, so that essence permeates into existence, or nirvana into samsara. Suchness within, i.e., original enlightenment, is constantly asserting itself in order to be actualized by breaking through the wall of ignorance. This intrinsic inner dynamics of suchness is suggested by the term “internal permeation.”

Wŏnhyo's commentary on the Awakening of Faith also explains that original enlightenment exerts a beneficial influence on sentient beings: "Because of the influence of original enlightenment, [the deluded mind] comes to have a modicum of enlightened function (kagyong/jueyong)."

Permeation through manifestation of the essence of suchness is explained in terms of the essence of suchness being primordially endowed with untainted dharmas (anāsrava-dharma). Fazang identifies this with the original enlightenment of non-emptiness. Because the essence of suchness possesses the nature of manifesting itself, as well as "suprarational functions," it permeates perpetually into ignorance. Moreover, suchness has the power to create purified perceptual fields, which Tanyan (516–588), the earliest extant commentator on the Awakening of Faith, understands as a kind of magical creation of the objects of the senses.

While the defiled principle has been permeating since beginningless time, it perishes with the attainment of Buddhahood. On the other hand, the pure principle is never terminated, as there is no end to the permeation of the influence of suchness, which is explained to be always permeating. Bodhisattvas who are united with this suchness are able to function spontaneously, adapting to circumstances and giving rise to free acts. In this way, buddhas and bodhisattvas benefit sentient beings, spontaneously perfuming them with their spiritual influence. This latter process by which sentient beings are benefitted from without pertains to "permeation through [external] influences."

== Influence and commentaries ==
Although often omitted from lists of canonical Buddhist texts, the Awakening of Faith strongly influenced subsequent Mahayana doctrine. It reflects an important stage in the synthesis of Indian and Chinese Buddhist thought, and the elevation of the tathagatagarbha doctrine to a central place in Chinese Buddhist soteriology. Commentaries on the Awakening in Faith were composed in China, Japan, and Korea by numerous exegetes.

=== Chinese Buddhism ===
The Awakening of Faith had a great influence on Chinese Buddhism. It is particularly important for Huayan Buddhism and Chan Buddhism. One of the reasons for this is the status of the influential commentator Fazang (法藏 ) as state preceptor (Guoshi) and third patriarch of the Huayan school. Fazang wrote an extensive Commentary on the Awakening of Faith (Taisho Tripitaka Vol. 44, No. 1846 大乘起信論義記 Dasheng qixinlun yiji) and placed the treatise at the highest class of his doctrinal classification system. Other figures like Guifeng Zongmi (probably written between 823 and 828) and Jingying Huiyuan (Taisho no. Vol. 44, No. 1843 大乘起信論義疏 Dasheng qixinlun yishu) also wrote commentaries on the Awakening of Faith. The Awakening of Faith thus had a key role in the teachings of the Huayan school.

Another important commentary on the Awakening of Faith is On the Interpretation of Mahāyāna (Shi Moheyan lun 釈摩訶衍論, Japanese: Shakumakaen-ron, Taisho no. 1668), which was traditionally attributed to Nagarjuna. However, according to Jiyun Kim, this text was likely composed in 8th century China and later spread to Korea and Japan (where it was influential on Kōbō Daishi and Shingon Buddhism). This text continued to be influential in later periods as can be seen by Ouyi Zhixu (1599–1655) who wrote Dasheng Qixin lun liewang shu 大乘起信論裂網疏 [Net-breaking subcommentary on the commentary on the Qixin lun].

The view of the mind in the Awakening of Faith also had a significant import on the doctrinal development of the East Mountain Teaching, an 8th-century tradition of Chan Buddhism. It is also considered to have strongly influenced the Chan doctrine of "seeing one's nature and attaining Buddhahood" (jianxing chengfo).

=== Korean Buddhism ===
The great Korean scholar Wonhyo wrote two commentaries: Taisho Tripitaka Vol. 44, No. 1844 起信論疏 Gisillon so and Taisho Tripitaka Vol. 44, No. 1845 Daeseung gisillon byeolgi. In great part due to the commentaries by Wonhyo, the Awakening of Faith ended up having an unusually powerful influence in Korea, where it may be the most oft-cited text in the entire tradition. It also provided much of the doctrinal basis for the original enlightenment thought found in the Sutra of Perfect Enlightenment.

=== Japanese Buddhism ===
In Tendai, it is often used to explain the original enlightenment thought (doctrine). Medieval Tendai Original Enlightenment Thought is established. It indirectly influenced the sects of the Kamakura period.

=== Modern Confucianism ===
Mou Zongsan (Chinese: 牟宗三) has used this and Tien Tai to develop his school of thought related to Confucianism, in particular about how to tie between two different aspects of the world.

== English translations ==
=== The Awakening of Faith ===
The translations by Hakeda and Jorgensen et al. are based on Paramārtha's version of the Chinese text (Taisho No. 1666) while Suzuki's translation is based on Śikṣānanda's version (Taisho No. 1667).

- Hakeda, Yoshito S., trans. (1967), Awakening of Faith—Attributed to Aśvaghoṣa, with commentary by Yoshito S. Hakeda, New York, NY: Columbia University Press, ISBN 0-231-08336-X
- Jorgensen, John; Lusthaus, Dan; Makeham, John; Strange, Mark, trans. (2019), Treatise on Awakening Mahāyāna Faith, New York, NY: Oxford University Press, ISBN 9780190297718
- Richard, Timothy (1907), The Awakening of Faith in the Mahāyāna Doctrine—the New Buddhism, Shanghai: Christian Literature Society, hdl:2027/coo1.ark:/13960/t9r21hd6n, OCLC 464637047 (Note: A Christian-influenced translation by a Baptist missionary, Tarocco (2008, p. 325))
- Suzuki, Daisetsu Teitaro (1900), Aśvaghoṣa's Discourse on the Awakening of Faith in the Mahayana, Chicago, Ill.: Open Court Publishing Company, hdl:2027/uva.x030116828, OCLC 4975000

=== Commentaries ===
Vorenkamp's translation of Fazang's commentary includes a translation of Paramārtha's version.

- Vorenkamp, Dirck, trans. (2004), An English Translation of Fa-Tsang's Commentary on the Awakening of Faith, Lewiston, NY: The Edwin Mellen Press, ISBN 0773463739
