= Tathātā =

True nature of things in Buddhism

Chinese name
- Chinese: 真如
Transcriptions
Standard Mandarin
- Hanyu Pinyin: Zhēnrú
- Wade–Giles: Chen-ju
Yue: Cantonese
- Jyutping: Zan^{1}jyu^{4}
Middle Chinese
- Middle Chinese: Tśjen-ńźjwo

Tibetan name
- Tibetan: དེ་བཞིན་ཉིད་
Transcriptions
- Wylie: de bzhin nyid

Vietnamese name
- Vietnamese alphabet: chân như

Korean name
- Hangul: 진여
Transcriptions
- Revised Romanization: Jinyeo
- McCune–Reischauer: Chinyŏ

Japanese name
- Kanji: 真如
- Hiragana: しんにょ
Transcriptions
- Romanization: Shin-nyo

Filipino name
- Tagalog: Tathata

Sanskrit name
- Sanskrit: तथाता

Pali name
- Pali: tathatā

Tathātā (/ˌtætəˈtɑː/; Sanskrit: तथाता; Pali: tathatā) is a Buddhist term often translated as Thusness or Suchness. It is the intrinsic and essential nature of all existences, free from dualistic thinking, conceptualization, and subject–object distinction. It represents the genuine reality of existence, which transcends physical forms, physical senses, and intellectual comprehension, indicating a profound insight into the nature of things as they truly are.

Tathātā has a large number of synonyms found in different Buddhist schools, traditions, and scriptures, such as: Emptiness (śūnyatā 空), Reality Realm (bhūta-koṭi 實際、實相), True Suchness (bhūta-tathatā 真如), Dharma Nature (Dharmatā 法爾、法然、法性), Dharma Realm (Dharma-dhātu 法界), Dharma Body (Dharma-kāya 法身), Nirvana (Nirvāṇa 涅槃), Vajra (金剛), Actionlessness (無爲), Dharma Intrinsic Nature (Dharma-svabhāva 法自性、法自然), Buddha-nature (Buddhatā, Buddha-svabhāva 佛性), Tathagata-Treasure (Tathāgata-garbha 如來藏), The True Reality of all phenomena (sarva-dharma-tathatā 諸法實相), etc.

Although it is a significant concept in Mahayana Buddhism, it is also used in the Theravada tradition.

== The Buddha ==
The Buddha referred to himself as the Tathāgata, which can mean either "One who has thus come" or "One who has thus gone", and can also be interpreted as "One who has arrived at suchness".

== Theravada Buddhism ==
In Theravada, this term designates the nature of existence (bhāva), the truth which applies to things. According to the Kathavatthu, tathātā is not an unconditioned or un-constructed (asankhata) phenomenon. The only phenomenon which is un-constructed in Theravada is Nibbana.

According to Buddhadasa Bhikkhu, tathātā is merely the way things are, the truth of all things: "When tathātā is seen, the three characteristics of anicca [impermanence], dukkha [suffering], and anatta [not-self] are seen, sunnata [emptiness] is seen, and idappaccayata [specific conditionality] is seen. Tathātā is the summary of them all – merely thus, only thus, not-otherness."

== Mahayana Buddhism ==
Tathatā in the East Asian Mahayana tradition is seen as representing the base reality and can be used to terminate the use of words. A 5th-century Chinese Mahayana scripture entitled Awakening of Faith in the Mahayana describes the concept more fully:

In its very origin suchness is of itself endowed with sublime attributes. It manifests the highest wisdom which shines throughout the world, it has true knowledge and a mind resting simply in its own being. It is eternal, blissful, its own self-being and the purest simplicity; it is invigorating, immutable, free... Because it possesses all these attributes and is deprived of nothing, it is designated both as the Womb of Tathagata and the Dharma Body of Tathagata.

R. H. Robinson, echoing D. T. Suzuki, conveys how the Laṅkāvatāra Sūtra perceives dharmata through the portal of śūnyatā: "The Laṅkāvatāra is always careful to balance Śūnyatā with Tathatā, or to insist that when the world is viewed as śūnya, empty, it is grasped in its suchness."

=== Madhyamaka ===
In the Madhyamaka Mahayana tradition, Tathātā is an uncompounded permanent phenomenon, (as is Nirvana – in Madhyamaka, not being products, all absences are uncompounded and permanent – not everlasting, but not subject to decay and dissolution). Tathātā is the natural absence of intrinsic/inherent existence or nature. It is a natural absence, because intrinsic existence (or the equivalent synonyms) is a fiction, or a non-existent: Intrinsic existence is the faulty object of an ignorant consciousness. All fictions, being fictions, are naturally absent. So, because of this, the fiction of inherent existence is absent from all phenomena, and that absence is Tathātā. Ultimately, however, Madhyamaka's Nāgārjuna even negates negation.

== See also ==
- Ten suchnesses
- Reality in Buddhism
- Dharmadhatu
- Ziran (Daoism)
- Tattva (Hinduism)
- Haecceity (from Latin, "this-ness")
- Quiddity (from Latin, "what-ness")

== Sources ==
- Buswell; Lopez (2014), The Princeton Dictionary of Buddhism
