= Fazang =

Chinese Buddhist scholar, translator, and religious leader

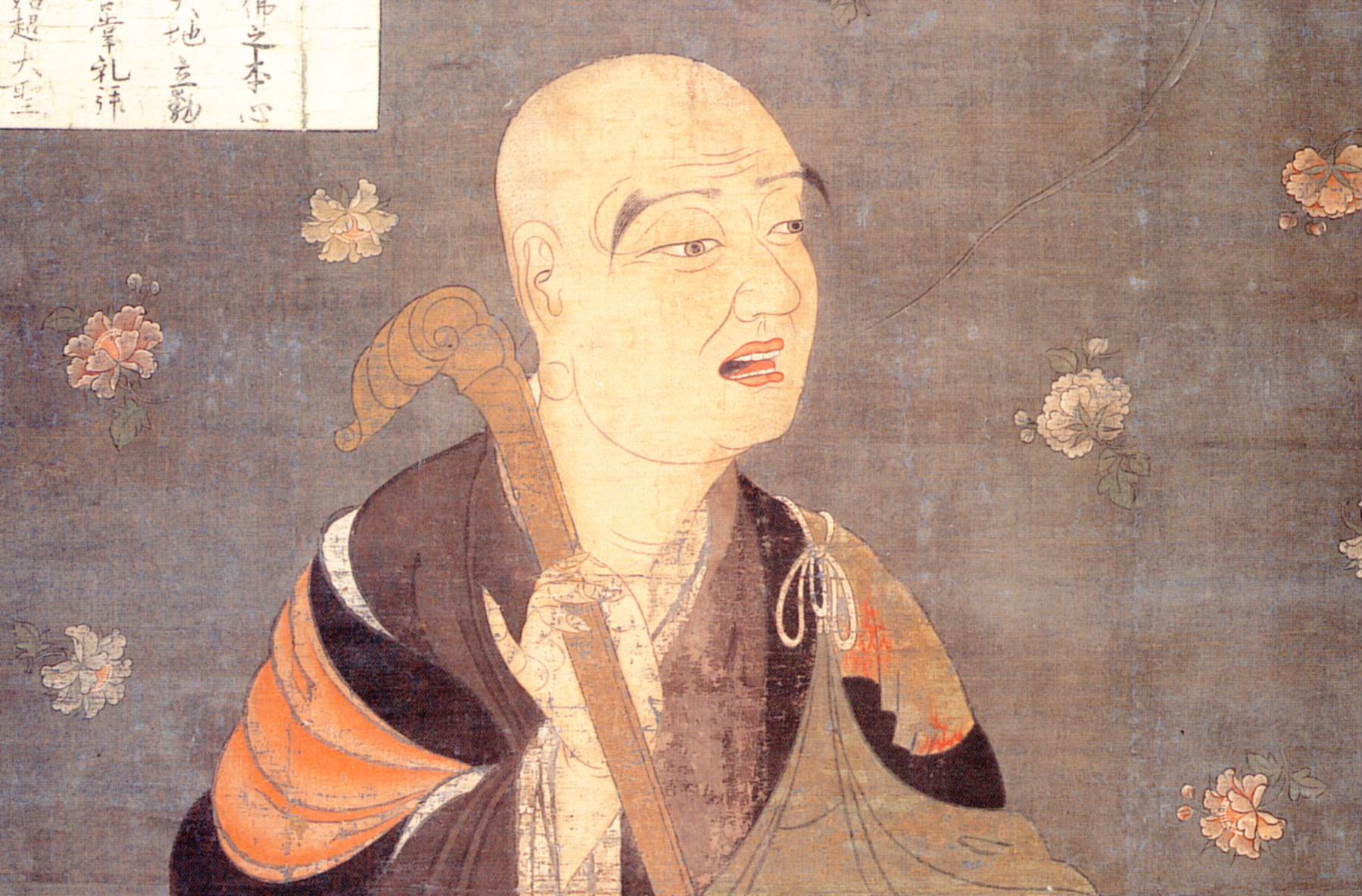
- Fazang in a 13th-century Japanese print

Personal life
- Born: 643 Chang’an, China
- Died: 712 (aged 69) Chang’an

Religious life
- Religion: Buddhism
- School: Huayan

Senior posting
- Teacher: Zhiyan

Fazang (Chinese: 法藏; pinyin: Fǎzàng; Wade–Giles: Fa-tsang; 643–712) was a Sogdian-Chinese Buddhist scholar, translator, and religious leader of the Tang dynasty. He was the third patriarch of the Huayan school of East Asian Buddhism, a key figure at the Chinese Imperial Court, and an influential Chinese Buddhist philosopher. Some scholars see him as the main figure in or even de facto founder of the Huayan school. Fazang's ancestors came from the Central Asian region of Sogdia, a major center for Silk Road trade, but he was born in the Tang capital of Chang'an (now Xi'an), where his family had become culturally Chinese.

Fazang was known for his skill as a translator, knowledge of Sanskrit, and for his efforts to produce a new translation of an extended edition of the Gaṇḍavyūha sūtra. He also composed an original commentary on the Avatamsaka Sutra, called the Huayan jing tanxuan ji (Record of Investigating the Mystery of the Huayan jing). He was also known as a popularizer and promoter of Huayan teachings, through his relationship with Empress Wu Zetian and his authorship of several essays on Huayan philosophy, especially Essay on the Golden Lion.

== Names ==
Although there remains ambiguity with varying interpretations of biographical sources, most recent scholarship promotes that the well-known name Fazang is not only the monk's dharma-name, but the secular name he used prior to being ordained. His surname was Kang, which originated from his place of birth, Kangjuguo. Furthermore, he had the nickname of Xianshou 賢首 which appears to have been the style-name given to him by his parents, despite prior claims that it was an honorific title from Empress Wu. This is further supported by Fazang's self-reference using the nickname, which strongly suggests it was not an honorific title as previous scholars thought. His title as a teacher and of distinction (biéhào 別號) was Dharma Master Guoyi 國一法師, in which his disciples referred to him post-ordination and in the latter stages of his life.

== Life ==
=== Early life ===
Little is known about Fazang's early life. Fazang's family were Sogdians and lived in an ethnically Sogdian enclave in the imperial capital of Chang’an. Fazang's father, Kang Mi, held an official title in the Tang court. Not much was known about his mother, although Chinese biographies state that she became pregnant "after dreaming of swallowing rays of sunshine". Accounts of the affluence of Fazang's grandfather hint at his father's ability to attain higher up positions in Tang aristocratic circles, despite being a Sogdian immigrant. However, epigraphic and textual sources show an abundance of ambiguity regarding his family.

In contrast to the uncertainty surrounding his blood relatives, Fazang's dharma family is better recorded in the sources. Zhiyan was his primary teacher, while Fazang's fellow scholars, Daocheng and Baochen, exerted additional influence. Fazang also had a multitude of fellow-disciples, although sources only record four primary names: Huixiao, Huaiji, Huizhao, and most famously, Uisang, who went on to establish Hwaeom Buddhism in Korea. It is argued that he had many other disciples, a nun-disciple Facheng, two Korean disciples in addition to Uisang, and finally a Chinese biographer, Qianli.

Fazang had an early interest in Buddhism. When he turned fifteen, he set his finger on fire in front of a “Ayuwang shelita” (a Famensi pagoda enshrining the finger bone of the Buddha). This was a popular religious practice at the time. Fazang became disappointed in his initial search for a proper teacher in the capital, and so he went to Mount Zhongnan, where he studied Mahayana sutras, like the Avatamsaka sutra and also engaged in Daoist practices of consuming herbal elixirs.

After several years of seclusion and hearing his parents were ill, Fazang returned to Chang’an and eventually met his first teacher Zhiyan, after impressing him with his knowledge of the Avatamsaka. He began his lay discipleship with Zhiyan in roughly 663; however, Fazang did extensive traveling and did not remain with his teacher consistently. Before Zhiyan's passing in 668, he instructed his two vinaya masters, Daocheng and Baochen, to care for Fazang. Daocheng was appointed as one of the three principals of the newly constructed monastery in Chang’an, Taiyuansi. This would be where Fazang would enter Buddhist priesthood for the remainder of his life. Previous biographical sources claim that Fazang was either overqualified for the bodhisattva-precepts or had his ordination situated in a miraculous context, yet both were distorted accounts attempting to validate the lack of evidence Fazang ever had a full ordination.

=== 670–700 ===
After 670 and Fazang's monastic ordination, he spent time travelling between Mount Zhongnan (staying at Wuzhensi and Zhixiangsi) and Taiyuansi in the capital. He often lectured on the Avatamsaka sutra.129 From 680 to 687, Fazang began working with the Indian monk Divākara on translating Indian texts into Chinese.

Between 688 and 689, Fazang was ordered by Empress Wu (at this time acting as regent) to build a high Avatamsaka-seat and bodhimanda of Eight Assemblies in Luoyang. This event provided an opportunity for elucidating and promoting the Avatamsaka sutra, and further established rapport between Fazang and Empress Wu, who would soon after establish her dynasty in 690. At this time, he also began his collaboration with the translator Devendraprajña. During this period, Fazang maintained correspondence with his dharma friend Uisang.

In the founding of Empress Wu's dynasty in 690, Fazang continued his teaching of the Avatamsaka sutra. He also travelled to various regions, visited his family, and debated with Daoist priests. A notable occurrence during this time was that Fazang was exiled to southern China (sometime between 694 and May 695). He returned later in 695 (August). The new translation of the Avatamsaka sutra (i.e. that of the Śikṣānanda translation team) was soon released and celebrated with a ceremony in 695. Fazang soon began lecturing on the sutra. In one instance (c. 700), an earthquake occurred during one of his lectures, and this was celebrated as a great sign.

Fazang also participated in the imperial suppression of the rebellion of the Khitans (c. 697). He performed some Buddhist rituals to aid the Chinese army, and this strengthened the relationship between Empress Wu and Fazang. The victorious war effort only increased enthusiasm for Buddhism at court. According to Chen, it is likely that Fazang used Xuanzang's version of the Dhāraṇī of Avalokiteśvara-ekadaśamukha, an esoteric dharani (incantation) for the purpose of repelling enemies intent on attacking.

=== 700–713 AD ===
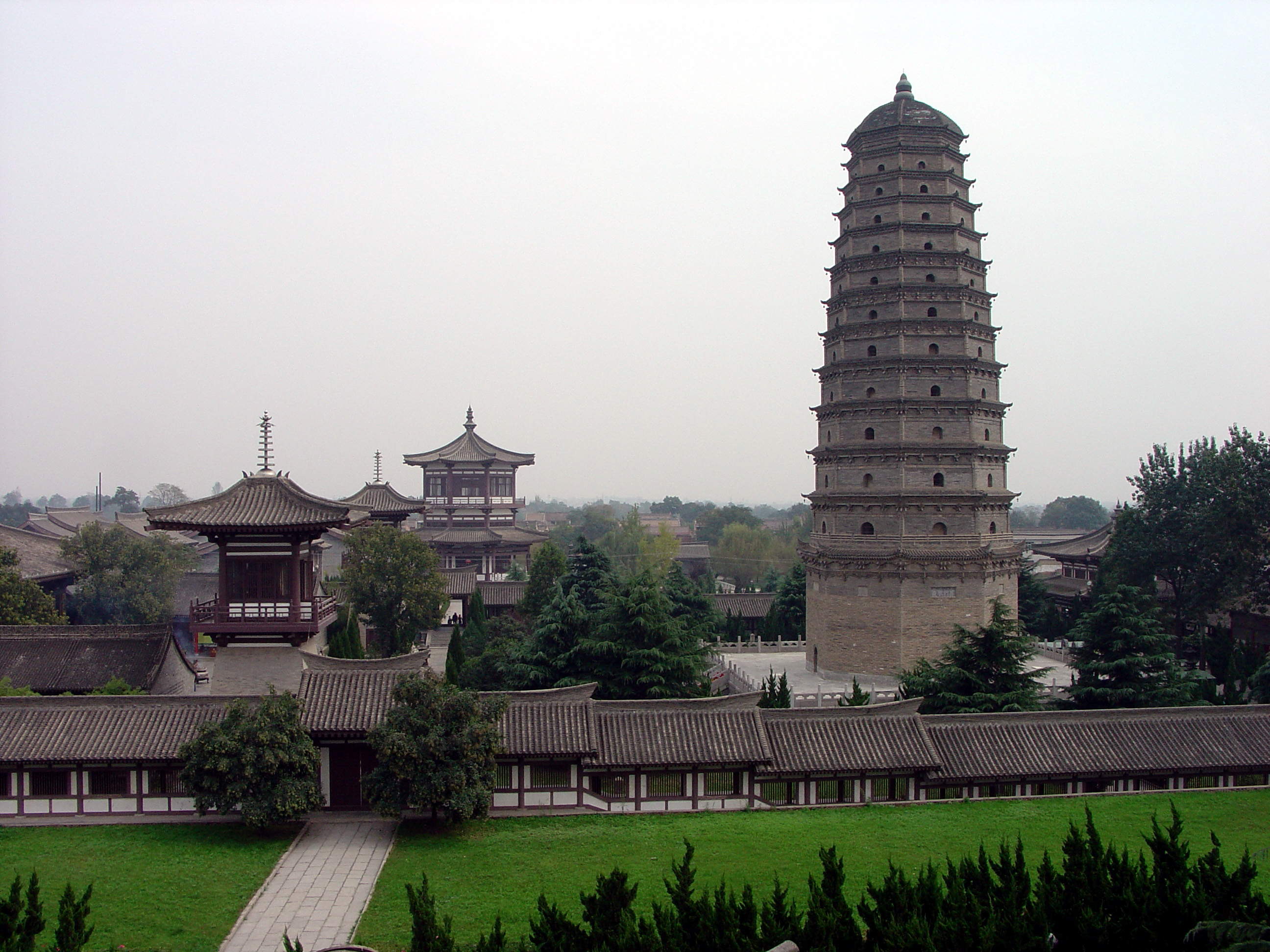
Famen temple

The 8th century saw much political change and unrest. From 700 to 705, Fazang continued translation work on the order of Empress Wu. He worked with Śikṣānanda's translation team on a new translation of the Lankavatara Sutra, which was completed in 704.

During this time, Fazang is said to have gone on a quest to Famen Temple to retrieve a sacred relic that supposedly provided therapeutic relief. Various veneration ceremonies were performed with the relic. After Wu's retirement of the position due to political infighting, Li Xian was reinstated as emperor, and Fazang declared his loyalty to him. Fazang also contributed to the quelling of a political rebellion during this time of unrest (by providing crucial information to the emperor). He was accordingly recognized and rewarded with a fifth-rank title from Emperor Zhongzong in 705. A monastery was also restored in his honor (Shengshansi).

In 706, Fazang joined Bodhiruci's translation team to work on the Mahāratnakūṭa sutra (Da Baoji jing). This translation project was the focus of his scholarly activity for some years to come (and it was not completed until 713, just after his death).

From 708 to 709, a drought threatened the capital area, and Fazang was commanded to perform the proper religious rituals to manifest rain. Much to Zhongzong's contentment, on the 7th day, a heavy downpour came about and lasted for ten nights. Fazang's miraculous abilities continued to be efficacious through the imperial shifts in power. Fazang seems to have made use of the esoteric Mahapratisara dharani for the purpose of a rainmaking ritual that is described in the text.

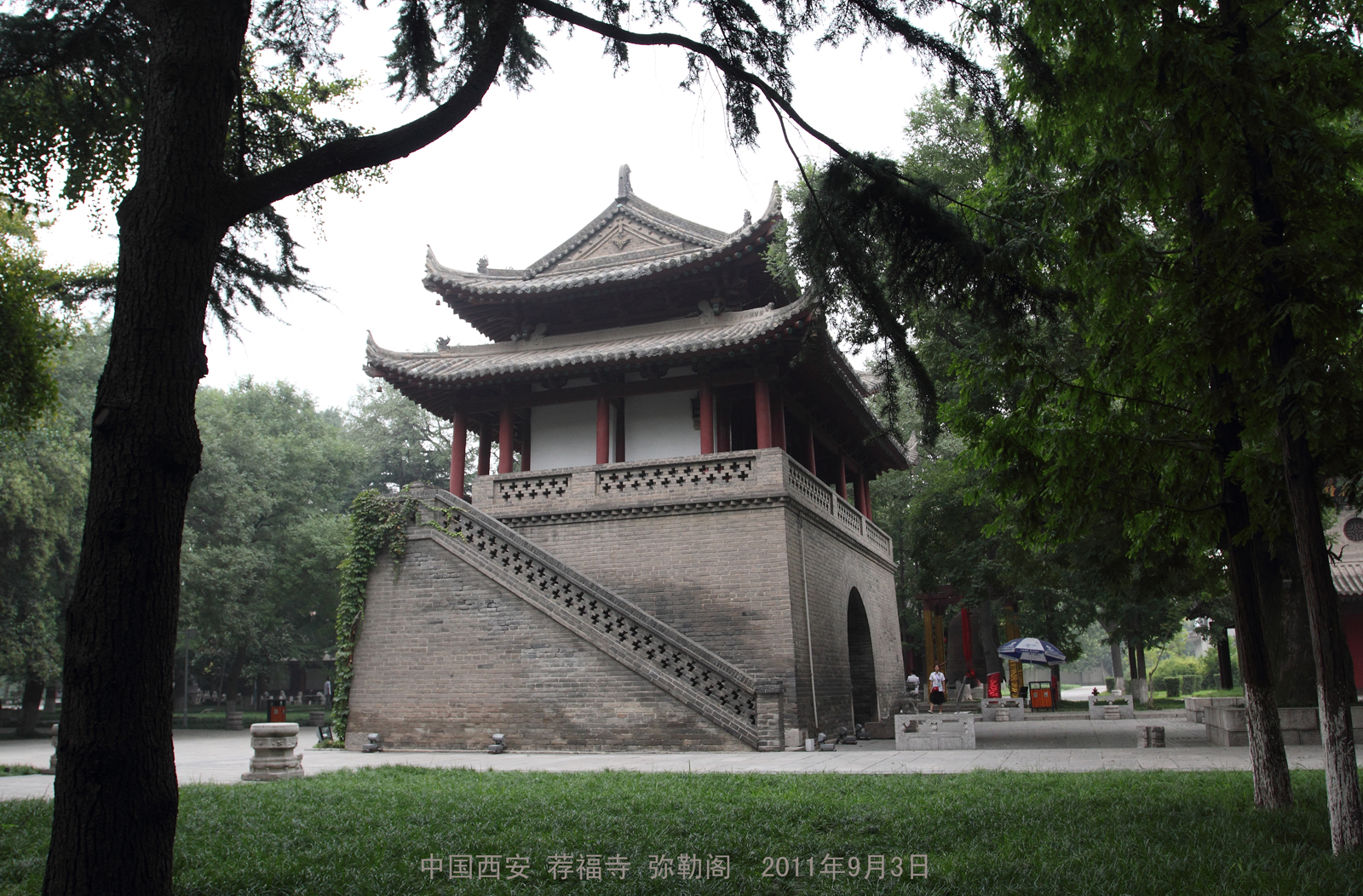
Jianfu temple, Xi'an

In the last years of his life, Fazang acquired increased imperial support, promoting the construction of new Huayan Buddhist monasteries in the two capitals (Chang’an and Luoyang), and as well as in Wu and Yue (Zhejiang and Jiangsu). According to Fazang's biographer Ch’oe Ch’iwon, the number of Avatamsaka societies (societies attended by laypersons to chant and study the sutra) is said to have "exceeded ten thousand" at this time.

Fazang died on December 16, 712 (at 69 years old) at Great Jianfu temple and was honored accordingly by Emperor Ruizong with a generous posthumous donation. Fazang was buried south of Huayansi, at Shenhe Plain.

=== Influence ===
Fazang's greatest influence was upon his dharma friend Uisang (625–702), who was a fellow disciple of Zhiyan's with Fazang and eventually returned to Korea to establish the Korean Huayan school, known as Hwaeom. It is well documented that they had a lifelong friendship and frequently corresponded through written letters. you can see how Fazang admired Uisang through the letters. Fazang was also influential on one of his Korean disciples, Simsang (Jp. Shinjō). Simsang is known for transmitting Huayan to Japan, and for being the teacher of Rōben (689–773), known as the founder of the Kegon school (Japanese Huayan).

In terms of propagating Huayan Buddhism in China, one of Fazang's greatest contributions was his translation work on the Avatamsaka sutra. In this, he collaborated with various Indian and Chinese masters. He also composed an important commentary to the sutra. The teachings of the Avatamsaka sutra were propagated through numerous lectures as well as through his close relationship with Empress Wu and other members of the imperial household. This ultimately led to the further establishment of Huayan Buddhist monasteries in around Chang'an as well as in Wu and Yue.

Fazang is also credited for having contributed greatly in improving and promoting the technology of wood block carving (xylography), which he used for the printing of Buddhist texts. Indeed, the earliest dated wood-block printed text was a copy of dharani sutra translated by Fazang in 704. The copy was discovered in Pulguksa, a Korean monastery.

== Works ==
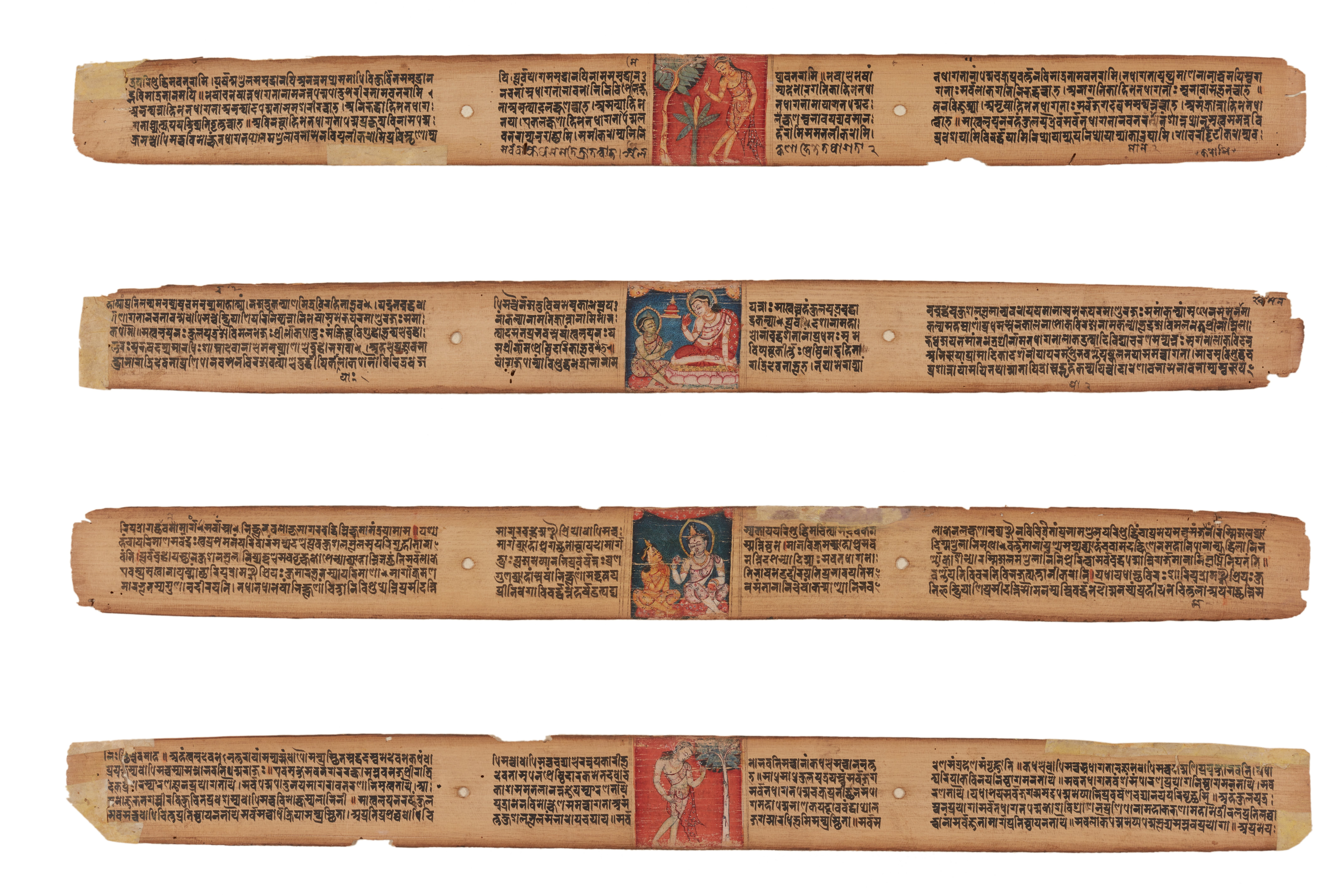
Four Leaves from a Sanskrit Gandavyuha Manuscript

=== Translation ===
Along with the Indian master Divākara (Dipoheluo 地 婆訶羅 or Rizhao 日照; 613–688), Fazang also produced a translation of an extended edition of the Gaṇḍavyūha sūtra (Ru fajie pin, 入法界品, Chapter on Entering the Realm of Dharma), which makes up the last section of the Avatamsaka sutra. This new translation was deemed necessary because the previous translator of the Avatamsaka sutra (Buddhabhadra) had produced a significantly shorter translation. The current Chinese edition of the 60 fascicle Avatamsaka Sutra actually includes Divākara and Fazang's translation of the Gaṇḍavyūha chapter. This edition was produced during a revision in the Song dynasty (960–1279). Fazang also worked with Divākara on other translation projects.

Another sutra which Fazang translated together with Divākara was the Ghanavyūha Sūtra (Mahāyāna Secret Adornment Sūtra, Chinese: 大乘密嚴經, Dà chéng mì yán jīng).

Fazang also took part in Śikṣānanda's translation efforts (from 695 to 699) to translate and edit the 80 fascicle Avatamsaka Sutra. This new translation was also missing parts, and so was completed with Fazang's translations.

At a later date (688), Fazang also worked with the pandita Devendraprajña (Tiyunbore 提雲般若) to translate two more chapters of the Avatamsaka sutra (which are not found in either the 60 or the 80 fascicle Avatamsaka sutra). These two independent Avatamsaka translations are:

- Da fangguang fo huayanjing xiuci fen 大方廣佛華嚴經修慈分
- Da fangguang fo huayan jing busiyi fo jingjie fen 大方廣佛華嚴經不思議佛境界分

=== Original works ===
Fazang wrote numerous works on Buddhism, his magnum opus is a commentary on the Avatamsaka (Huayan) sutra, the Huayan jing tanxuan ji (華嚴經探玄記, Record of Investigating the Mystery of the Huayan jing) in 60 fascicles.

Other key works of Fazang include:

1. Jin shizi zhang 金獅子章 (The Treatise on Golden Lion), an essay that encapsulates the key teaching of Huayan Buddhism
2. Huayan wujiao zhang 華嚴五教章 (Treatise on the Five Huayan Teachings), which contains the key panjiao (doctrinal classification) system of Huayan. It has an alternate name: Paragraphs on the Doctrine of Difference and Identity of the One Vehicle of Huayan (Huayan yisheng jiaoyi fenqi zhang, 華嚴一乘教分齊章, T. 1866). It has been translated twice into English, once by Francis Cook as Fa-tsang’s Treatise on the Five Doctrines: An Annotated Translation (1970) and the more recent one by BDK, the Treatise on Doctrinal Distinctions of the Huayan One Vehicle.
3. The Gist of the Huayan Sutra (Hua-yen ching chih kuei)
4. Outline of the Text and Doctrine of the Huayan Sutra (Hua-yen ching wen i kang mu)
5. Treatise on the Avataṃsaka Sūtra (Huayanjing zhang 華厳経章, T. 45, #1874)
6. Dasheng qixin lun yiji 大乘起信論義紀 (Commentary on the Treatise of the Mahayana Awakening of Faith). This work remains one of the most important commentaries on this treatise. An English translation has been published by Dirck Vorenkamp.
7. Huayan jing wenyi gangmu (Essentials of the Teachings of Huayan Jing, Taisho 35, no. 1734), this text explains the "ten mysteries" doctrine.
8. Commentary on the Brahmajala sutra (Fanwang jing pusa jieben shu, Taisho 40, no. 1813).
9. Commentary to the Lankavatara sutra. Fazang considered the Lanka to be one of the definitive sutras.
10. A Record Conveying the Meaning of the Tenets of the Treatise on the Twelve Gates, a commentary to Nagarjuna's Treatise on the Twelve Gates (十二門論, pinyin: Shiermenlun, T. 1568). A translation of this commentary has been published by Dirck Vorenkamp.
11. Cultivation of Contemplation of the Inner Meaning of the Huayen: The Ending of Delusion and Return to the Source (Hsiu hua-yen ao chih wang chin huan yuan kuan). This was written in Fazang's old age as a concise summary of the Huayan teaching.
12. A commentary to the Ghanavyūha Sūtra, called Dasheng miyan jing shu (大乘密嚴經疏, no. X368 in the supplement to the Taisho canon, Xu zang jing 續藏經 vol. 34).
13. A commentary on Saramati's Dasheng fajie wu chabie lun 大乘法界無差別論, Skt. Dharmadhātu-aviśeṣa śāstra; Treatise on the Non-Distinction of the Dharmadhātu of Mahāyana, Taisho no. 1626) titled Dasheng fajie wu chabie lun bingxu (大乘法界無差別論疏 并序, Taisho no. 1838).

The Huayan fajie guanmen 華嚴法界觀門 (Method of Mental Examination on the Realm of Dharma) has been traditionally attributed to Dushun (557–640), but some scholars argue that it is actually by Fazang.

== Philosophy ==
Fazang's thought focuses on a unique interpretation of the classic Buddhist principle of pratītyasamutpāda (dependent arising) – how all phenomena are conditioned and arise dependent on other phenomena. Fazang (and the Huayan tradition in general) depicts the cosmos as an infinite number of interdependent and interpenetrating phenomena (dharmas), which make up one holistic net, the one universal dharma realm. Fazang draws out the metaphysical implications of this Buddhist doctrine within a Mahayana framework informed by ideas like buddha-nature (which he considers to be the source of all things) and mind-only (cittamatra), often interpreted as a kind of idealism. He did this in a uniquely Chinese prose that also draws on Daoist and classical Chinese influences. Two of Fazang's works, The Rafter Dialogue and On the Golden Lion, outline the basic Huayan doctrine and are among the most celebrated Huayan texts.

In East Asian Buddhism, the Dharmadhatu (法界, fajie, realm of dharma) is the whole of reality, the totality of all things, the absolute. Fazang develops this idea and brings together various Huayan teachings into a holistic view of the entire universe, which Alan Fox calls the Huayan "Metaphysics of Totality". Two key elements of Fazang's understanding of the absolute are "dharmadhatu pratītyasamutpāda" (法界緣起, fajie yuanqi, the dependent arising of the whole realm of phenomena), which for Fazang refers to the interrelatedness and interfusion of all phenomena (dharmas); and "nature origination," (xingqi) which refers to how phenomena arise out of an absolute nature, which is buddha-nature, or the "One Mind".

=== Interpenetration and perfect interfusion ===
A 2-dimensional representation of Indra's Net representing non-obstructive infinite interpenetration.

A key element of Fazang's understanding of the totality of things is a unique view of the Buddhist theory of dependent arising, which is informed by Mahayana sources like the Avatamsaka sutra. This unique Huayan view of dependent arising is called "dharmadhatu pratītyasamutpāda" (法界緣起, fajie yuanqi, the dependent arising of the whole realm of phenomena). According to Wei Daoru, this theory holds that "countless dharmas (all phenomena in the world) are representations of the wisdom of Buddha without exception ('pure mind of the original nature', 'one-mind' or 'dharmadhatu'). They exist in a state of mutual dependence, interfusion and balance without any contradiction or conflict."

The central and unique element of this view of dependent arising is the "interpenetration" (xiangru) of all phenomena (dharmas) and their "perfect interfusion" (yuanrong, 圓融). It is a holistic theory which holds that any thing or phenomenon (dharma) exists only as part of the whole. That is to say, the existence of any single thing depends on the total network of all other things, which are all equally fused with each other, interdependent with each other and mutually determined (xiangji) by each other. As Bryan Van Norden describes this theory, "because the identity of any one thing is dependent on the identities of other things, 'one is all,' and because the whole is dependent for its identity on its parts, 'all is one.'" According to Fazang, “one is many, many is one” (yi ji duo, duo ji yi), because the existence and nature of any phenomenon determines and is determined by the sum of all phenomena. Likewise, he also asserts “one in many, many in one” (yi zhong duo, duo zhong yi), because any phenomenon (dharma) penetrates and is penetrated by the existence and nature of the sum of all phenomena.

Alan Fox similarly describes the doctrine of interpenetration as the fact that all possible particular events "overlap and coexist simultaneously and at all times, without conflict or obstruction." Thus, according to this theory, the existence of any object at any moment is a function of its context as part of the whole network of relations in the universe. Furthermore, because of this, all phenomena are so interconnected that they are fused together without any obstructions in a perfectly harmonious whole (which is the entire universe, the Dharmadhatu).

One schema which is used by Fazang in explaining the depth of interpenetration and non-obstruction is “ten profound principles” (shi xuanmen). The basic idea of the ten profound principles is outlined by Antonio S. Cua as follows:

It is a vision of perfect harmony, in which all forms and levels of phenomenal beings, understood as formations of the tathagatagarbha (9), are perceived as existing in perfect accord (1), penetrating (2) and determining (3) each other irrespective of size (5) and temporal distinctions (8). Each phenomenal entity is like each jewel in the net of Indra (4), penetrating and determining all other phenomenal entities as well as being penetrated and determined by them (6), appearing at once as the center of the entire phenomenal realm and as one of its elements (7). Even the most minute phenomenal entity appears as containing the whole universe (5) and as exemplifying the ideal state of total nonobstruction (10).

=== Illustrations of interpenetration ===
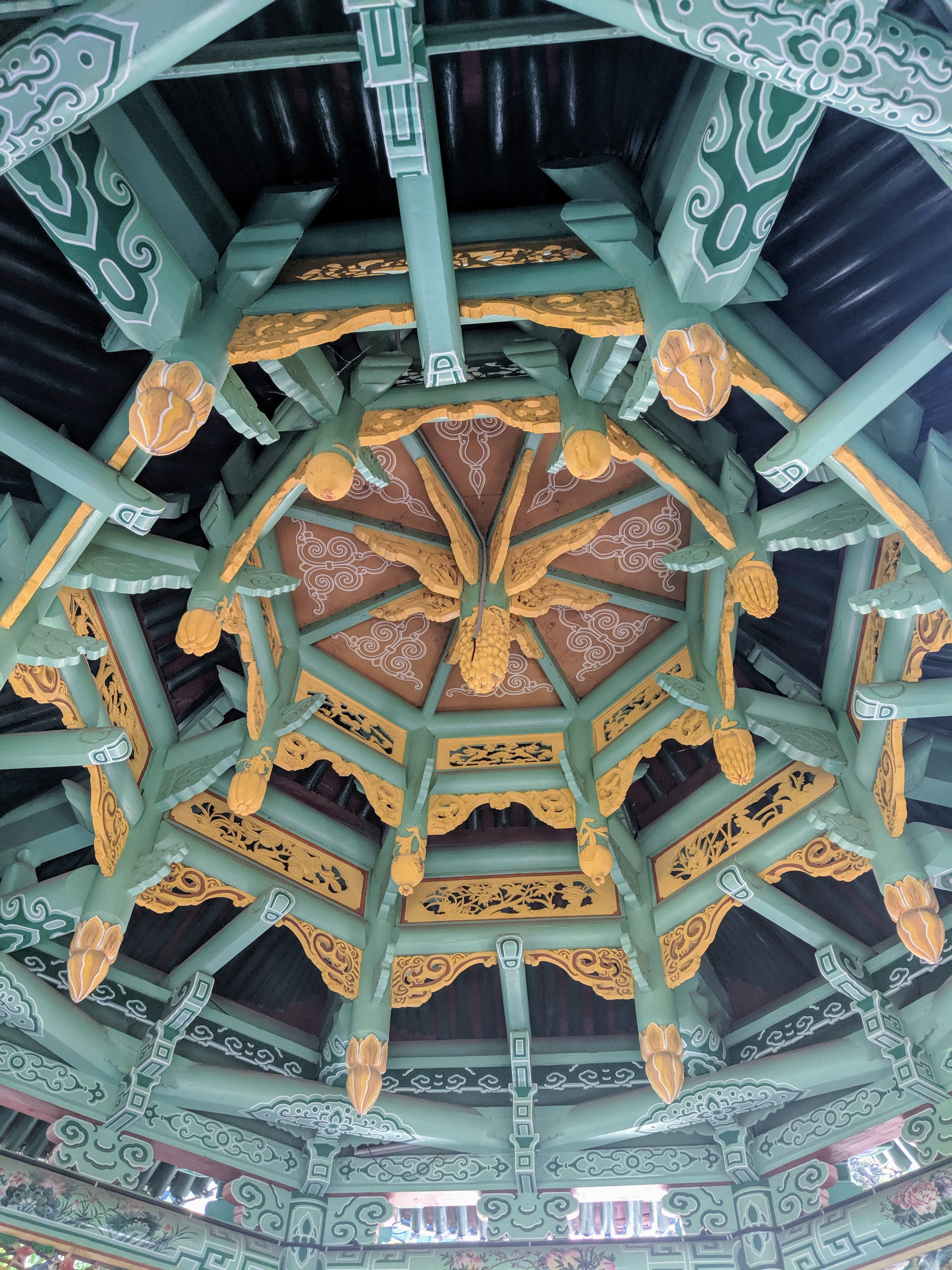
Photo of the ceiling of Ci'en Temple (Liaoning), depicting an intricate system of rafters.

Fazang was known for the various similes, demonstrations and metaphors he used to explain this idea, including Indra's net, the rafter and the building, and the hall of mirrors. Interfusion was also a method of reflection, contemplation and Buddhist practice, a way to observe and understand things, and was not just a philosophy theory.

Fazang's “Rafter Dialogue” explains Huayan metaphysics by using extended metaphor of the relation between a rafter (a part) and the building (a whole). It is part of a longer treatise, Paragraphs on the Doctrine of Difference and Identity of the One Vehicle of Huayan (Taishō no. 1866), which discusses the doctrines of interpenetration, i.e. the absence of obstruction between all phenomena, and emptiness. According to Fazang, a building (standing in for the universe, the entire realm of all phenomena) is nothing more than the sum of its parts, and thus an individual rafter (or any individual phenomenon) is essential to the identity of the building. Likewise, the rafter is also fused with the building, because its identity as a rafter is dependent on it being part of the building. Thus, according to Fazang, any individual dharma (phenomenon) is necessarily dependent upon the entirety of all dharmas in the universe (the dharmadhatu), and because of this, dharmas lack any metaphysical independence. However, dharmas are also distinct insofar as they have a unique and particular function in the total web of dependent causes and conditions (and if it did not have this function, the universe would be a different universe). As Fazang says, “each part is identical [in making the whole and in allowing each part to be what it is], and they are identical because they are different”.

In another example, Fazang used ten mirrors arranged into an octagon (with two above and below) with a Buddha image and a torch at the center. According to Alan Fox, "Fazang then ignited a torch in the center, and the room was filled with reflections within reflections of the torch and the Buddha. This effectively demonstrated the Huayan view of reality as a web of causal relations, each “node” or interstices of which lacks any essential identity, and each of which is in some sense contained within everything else even as it contains everything else."

=== Perfect interfusion of the six characteristics ===
The Rafter Dialogue provides six characteristics, or six ways of understanding the relation between part and whole (and their interfusion), as well as between part and part. Each characteristic refers to a specific kind of relation between parts and wholes. This schema provides six mereological perspectives on the nature of phenomena. Fazang uses these characteristics as a way of further explaining the doctrine of perfect interfusion and how wholeness and diversity remain balanced in it. This is called the "perfect interfusion of the six characteristics" (liuxiang yuanrong 六相圓融).

The six characteristics are:

1. Wholeness / universality (zongxiang): each dharma (like a rafter) is characterized by wholeness, because it takes part in creating a whole (like a building), and each dharma is indispensable in creating the whole.
2. Particularity / distinctness (biexiang): a dharma is characterized by particularity (e.g. any specific rafter) as far as it is a numerically distinct particular that is different than the whole.
3. Identity / sameness (tongxiang): each dharma is characterized by a certain identity with all other parts of the whole, since they all mutually form the whole without conflict.
4. Difference (yixiang): each dharma is different, since they have distinct functions and appearance, even while being part of a single whole.
5. Integration (chengxiang): each dharma is integrated together with other dharmas in forming each other and in forming the whole, and each dharma does not interfere with every other dharma.
6. Non-integration / disintegration (huaixiang): the fact that each part maintains its unique activity and retains its individuality while making up the whole.

According to Wei Daoru, Fazang's schema is supposed to illustrate how all things are in a state of mutual correspondence and interfusion, and how all phenomena are completely non-dual. Fazang also warns readers of the extremes of “annihilationism” (seeing phenomena as non-existent) and “eternalism” (seeing phenomena as uncaused, independent and eternal). These are both ontological extremes that the Buddha originally rejected in embracing the “Middle Way”. Fazang's schema is therefore also an attempt to provide an ontological middle way.

=== Principle (li) and phenomena (shi) ===
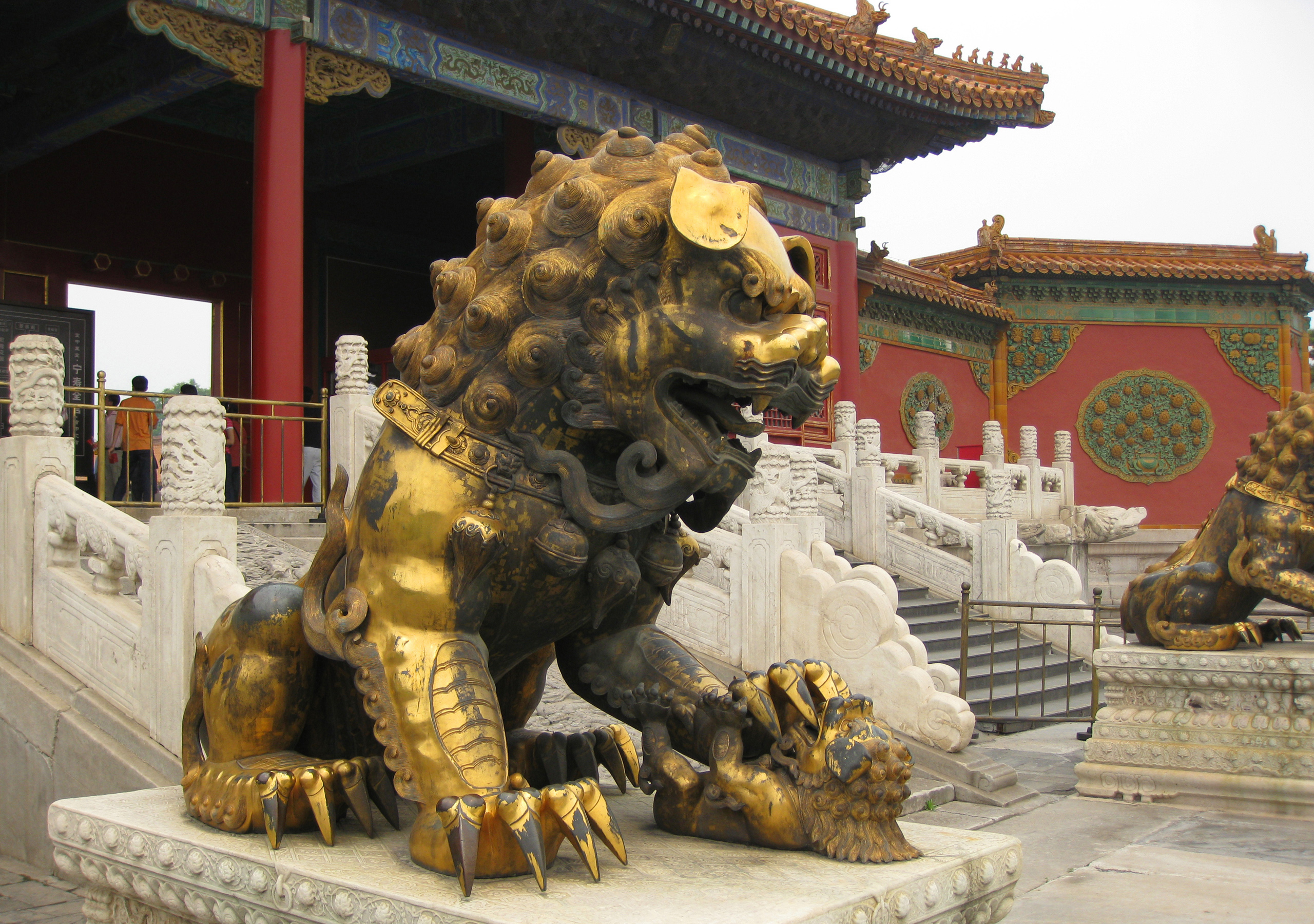
A golden Chinese lion in the Forbidden City, Beijing.

In his famous Essay on the Golden Lion (Taishō no. 1881), Fazang provides a succinct explanation of a key principle of Huayan thought, that of the ultimate principle or pattern (li 理) and the relative phenomena / events / things (shi 事). To do this, he uses the statue of a golden lion as a metaphor. According to Van Norden: “The gold of the statue is a metaphor for the unified, underlying Pattern of relationships, while the appearance of the statue as a lion is a metaphor for our illusory perception of things as independent individuals. We must recognize that the only thing that ultimately exists is the Pattern of relationships among momentary events. (There is really only gold; there is no lion.) However, we must also acknowledge that it is useful and appropriate to continue to speak as if there were independent, persistent individuals. (The gold really does appear to be a lion.)”. In Huayan Buddhism, li, the principle or pattern is the ultimate reality (paramārtha-satya) which is experienced by Buddhas. According to Van Norden, this principle is a "boundless and ceaseless activity that has a patterned coherence to it".

According to Fazang, Li is boundless and ceaseless, while the phenomena (shi) are impermanent, relative and limited. The metaphor is intended to illuminate the relation between the ultimate principle and the myriad phenomena. Because the boundless principle (or, the gold) always remains empty and lacks a permanent nature (zixing), it can be transformed into many relative forms (like the various shapes that make up the lion statue).

The metaphor also explains the relation between objects and their underlying nature, i.e. an object appears as an independent thing, but actually lacks any independent existence apart from the ultimate principle. Even though conventional phenomena are not wholly representative of the ultimate principle or pattern, they can still be pragmatically understood as relative apparent phenomena.

Another important element of this metaphor is that the ultimate principle and the relative phenomena are in some sense interdependent, unified and interfused, that is to say, they are non-dual.

=== The three natures (sanxing) ===
Drawing on the Awakening of Faith, Fazang presents a unique interpretation of the Yogacara theory of the Three Natures (Skt. tri-svabhāva; 三性, sanxing): the “discriminate nature” (fenbie xing), “dependent nature” (yita xing), and “true nature” (zhenshi xing). The Awakening of Faith states that there is one mind (the pure buddha-nature) and two aspects (a samsaric and a nirvanic aspect). Fazang draws on this model and argues that each of the three natures also has two aspects: a fundamental aspect that is unchanging, pure, and also empty, and a derivative aspect that is fully interdependent, conditioned, and relative.

Fazang equates the most fundamental of the three natures, the "true nature", with the tathagatagarbha (buddha-nature). The "true nature" has a dual nature: (1) “being immutable” (bubian), referring to the pure aspect of buddha nature, and (2) “responding to conditions” (suiyuan), which refers to the buddha-nature influenced by ignorance. The conditioned aspect of buddha-nature gives rise to the phenomenal world, and thus, to the "dependent nature", which also has two aspects. First, it is “without self-nature” (wuxing), since all dharmas depend on the tathagatagarbha for their existence, and secondly it also has a “semblance of existence” (shiyou), i.e. it appears to exist independently. Ordinary beings who do not understand the true nature of the dependent nature think that phenomena really exist independently, and this mistaken perception gives rise to the “discriminate nature.” The dual aspects of this discriminate nature are: (1) “being inexistent in reality” (liwu), the imagined phenomena seen by ordinary beings are non-existent and (2) “appearing to be existent to the senses” (qingyou).

According to Fazang, each of the three nature's two aspects are also understood as being non-dual with all the others and interconnected / interfused with each other. Thus, while we can speak of two aspects, Fazang writes that they "completely encompass one another, forming one, not two natures." Likewise, regarding the three natures, none of them conflict or obstruct the other, allowing for a harmony between the unchanging "base" (ben) or “true origin” (zhenyuan) and the phenomenal “derivatives” (mo, or “false derivatives”, wangmo), both of which perfectly interfuse and pervade one another.

Furthermore, Fazang argues that since each of the three natures has their derivative aspects, they also must have their fundamental aspect.

=== Nature origination ===
According to Fazang's commentary on Mahayana Awakening of Faith, all phenomena (dharmas) arise from a single ultimate source, the "nature" or "One Mind". This is variously described as Suchness, the tathagatagarbha (the womb of tathagatas), buddha-nature, or just "nature". This nature is the ontological source and basis of all things, which is prior to any objects or conscious subjects. This doctrine which states that all dharmas arise from the buddha-nature has been termed "nature-origination" (xingqi), and the term derives from chapter 32 of the Avatamsaka Sutra, titled Nature Origination of the Jewel King Tathagata (Baowang rulai xingqi pin, Skt. Tathâgatotpatti-sambhava-nirdesa-sûtra).

As noted by Hamar, for Fazang, nature origination (utpatti-sambhava) means "the appearance of the Absolute in the phenomenal world...this is the appearance of Tathagata in the world as a teacher for benefit of living beings and the appearance of the wisdom of Tathagata in living beings." This pure nature is also not separate from living beings and all the phenomena (dharmas) in the universe. This is because the Buddha only manifests in the world due to the needs of sentient beings and he would not come into the world if there were no impure phenomena. Thus, for Fazang, the ultimate nature is non-dual with all relative phenomena and interconnected with all of them. As such, the source is still empty of self-existence (svabhava) and is not an essential nature that is independent of all things, but rather it is interdependent on the whole of all phenomena.

Fazang writes that nature-origination can be understood from two perspectives: from the perspective of the cause and from the perspective of the fruit. From the causal perspective, "nature" refers to the buddha-nature innate in all living beings which (in living beings) remains covered over with defilements. When defilements are all removed, the manifestation of buddha-nature is the "nature-origination". Furthermore, drawing on the Buddha-nature treatise, Fazang writes that there are three kinds of nature and origination: principle, practice and fruit (li xing guo). As Hamar explains these: "Principle-nature is the Buddha-nature inherent in all beings before they begin to practice Buddhism. Practice-nature is the Buddha-nature in those beings who practice Buddhism. Fruit-nature is the Buddha-nature of those practitioners who have attained enlightenment."

From the perspective of the fruit, "nature" refers to the nature that is realized on the attainment of Buddhahood. In this case, nature-origination refers to the functions of the innumerable wonderful buddha qualities and powers.

=== Vairocana Buddha ===
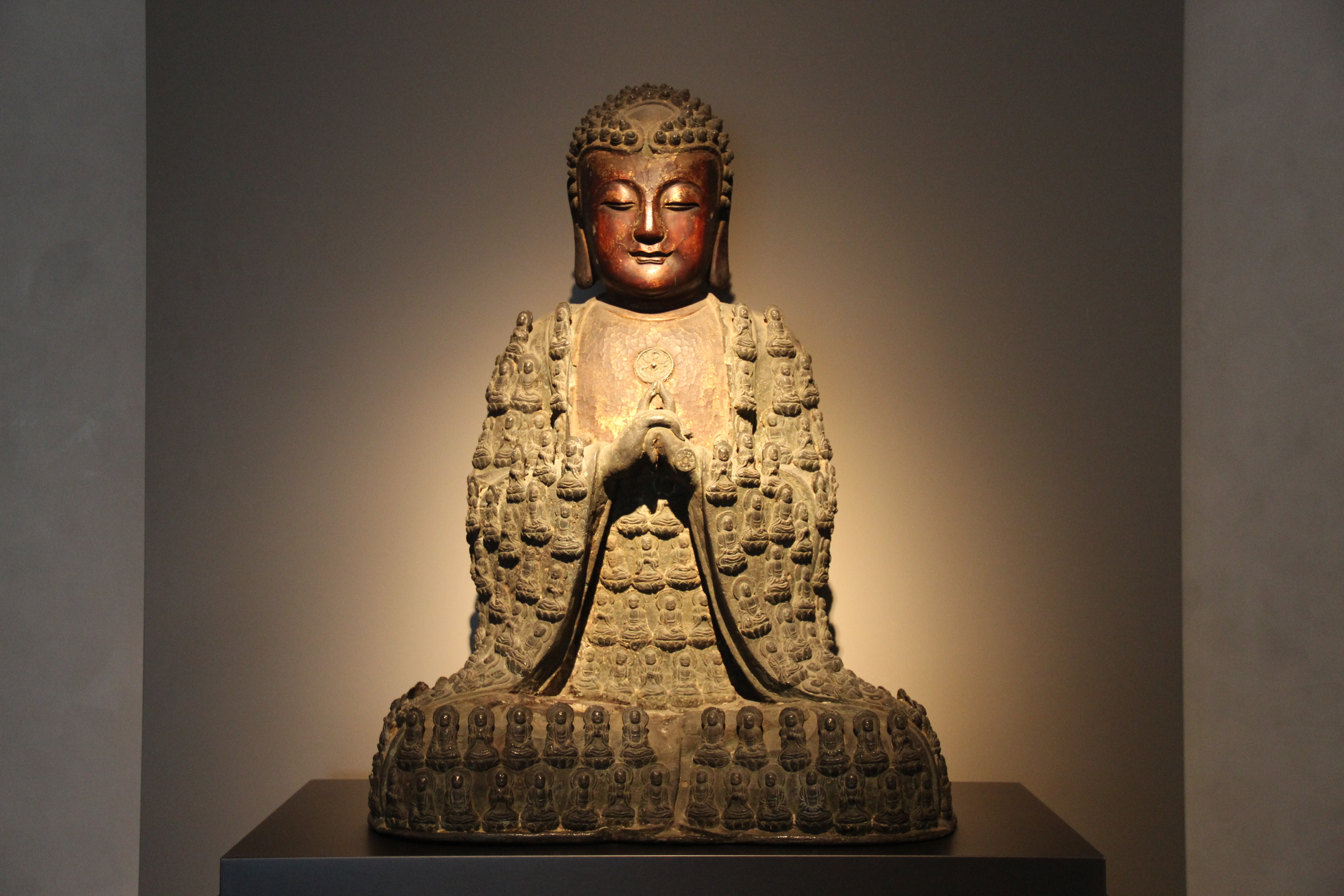
Bronze of Vairocana, Ming dynasty, Aurora Museum, Shanghai.

Fazang, and the Huayan tradition as a whole, venerate a particular understanding of the universe as being the very body of the supreme cosmic Buddha Vairocana (whose name means "The Illuminator"). Vairocana's body is an infinite one that comprises the entire universe. Vairocana's light permeates all phenomena in the cosmos, his life is infinite and there is no place in the universe where Vairocana's teachings and manifestations are not present. Vairocana is also equated with the ultimate principle (li), and as such, Vairocana is "the substance underlying phenomenal reality" according to Francis Cook. Furthermore, this ultimate reality is immutable and yet it changes according to conditions, and emanates everything in the phenomenal world. It is thus both unchanging and also interdependent (and therefore empty) and dynamic. Vairocana's immutability is its transcendental aspect, while its conditioned nature is its immanent aspect. Cook has called this view of an all pervasive cosmic Buddha "pan-Buddhism", since it holds that everything is the Buddha and the Buddha is omnipresent in all things.

Cook is careful to note that Buddha Vairocana is not a monotheistic God, nor has the functions of a God, since he is not a creator of the universe, nor a judge or father who governs the world. However, other scholars have positively compared the Huayan view with theism. Weiyu Lin sees Fazang's conception of Vairocana, which is "omnipresent, omnipotent and identical to the universe itself", as containing elements which resemble some forms of theism. However, Lin also argues that Fazang's metaphysics of emptiness and interdependence prevents any reification of Vairocana as a monotheistic God.

According to Fazang, Vairocana is the author of the Avatamsaka Sutra. The sutra is taught through all of the ten bodies of Vairocana. The "ten bodies" is Fazang's main buddha body theory (which differs from the Mahayana three bodies theory). The ten bodies are: All-Beings Body, Lands Body, Karma Body, Śrāvakas Body, Pratyekabuddha Body, Bodhisattvas Body, Tathāgatas Body, Jñānakāya Body, Dharmakāya Body, and the Space Body. The number ten also has symbolic meaning, since it signifies perfection and infinitude. According to Fazang, the ten bodies also encompass the “three worlds”, and thus, he equates the ten bodies with all phenomena in the universe. For Fazang, the Buddha pervades and is included in all dharmas. This includes all beings as well as all inanimate phenomena.

Furthermore, Fazang says that "whatever body in the Ten Bodies is brought up, all the other nine bodies would also be included." According to Weiyu Lin, "in other words, each body simultaneously includes all the others and is, in turn, included in all of them. Their relationship is “interpenetrating” (xiangru 相入) and “mutually inclusive(xiangshe 相攝)."

=== The path to awakening and the nature of time ===
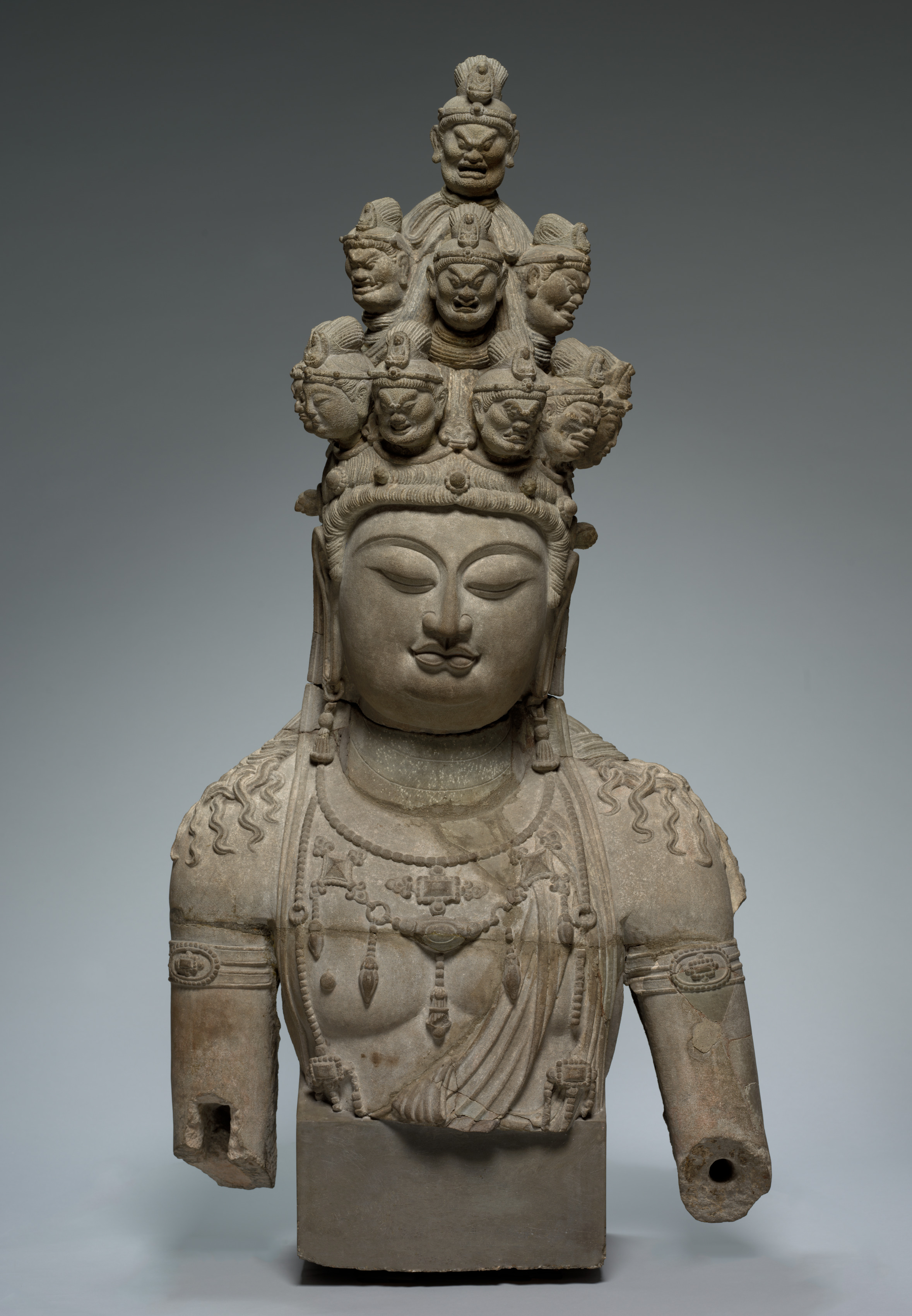
A Tang dynasty statue of Eleven-headed Guanyin bodhisattva

Fazang's understanding of the Buddhist path to awakening is informed by his metaphysics of interfusion and interpenetration. According to Fazang, “in practicing the virtues, when one is perfected, all are perfected.” Furthermore, he also writes that: “when one first arouses the thought of enlightenment [bodhicitta] one also becomes perfectly enlightened”. Thus, Fazang's model of practice is one of sudden and non-dual awakening which holds that as soon as bodhicitta arises, full awakening is present within it. Since any phenomenon contains and is interfused with the entire universe, any element of the Buddhist path contains the entire path – even its fruit (buddhahood).

For Fazang, this is true even for temporally distant events (like a sentient being's practice now and their eventual Buddhahood aeons from now). This is because, for Fazang, time is empty, and all moments (past, present, and future) are interfused with each other. Any segment of time is interconnected with all others and depends on all other moments. Thus, Fazang writes:

Because an instant has no essence, it penetrates the eternal, and because the lengthy epochs have no essence, they are fully contained in a single instant...therefore, in an instant of thought all elements of the three periods of time – past, present, and future-are fully revealed.

This means that not only does the end depend on the beginning, but the beginning depends on the end. Thus, while buddhahood depends on the first thought aimed at awakening (bodhicitta) and on the initial attainment of faith, the initial stages of practice also depend on the future buddhahood as well. Fazang thus seems to be rejecting any linear causation and to be supporting some form of retrocausality. As Fazang writes, "beginning and end Interpenetrate. On each stage, one is thus both a Bodhisattva and a Buddha."

Furthermore, because of emptiness and interpenetration, all stages of the bodhisattva path contain each other. Fazang's understanding of the path to Buddhahood is based on the Avatamsaka sutra's 52 stages (bhumi) model. The 52 begin with the ten stages of faith (shixin 十信), and then follows the ten abodes (shizhu 十住), ten practices (shixing 十行), ten dedications of merit (shihuixiang 十迴向), ten grounds (shidi 十地), virtual enlightenment (dengjue 等覺), and marvellous enlightenment (miaojue 妙覺). However, Fazang does not understand this process in a linear manner, since each of these stages and practices are all said to be interfused with each other and with Buddhahood itself (as with the example of the rafter, which is only a rafter due to its dependence on the whole building). As Fazang says, "If one stage is acquired, all stages are acquired". Fazang calls this the "superior progress", which entails "the acquisition of all stages as well as the stage of Buddhahood" as soon as one has reached the "perfection of faith."

According to Imre Hamar, Fazang was the first to argue that "enlightenment at the stage of faith" (xinman cheng fo 信滿成佛) was "a unique doctrine of the distinct teaching of One Vehicle". According to Fazang, "all practices are born from resolute faith." Thus, for Fazang, at the initial stages of the path (after having given rise to faith and bodhicitta), a bodhisattva already has access to the limitless merit of all the other stages (since all stages are mutually interfused with each other). Thus, for Fazang, the first initial arising of bodhicitta is also the stage of irreversibility, the stage at which one knows one is assured to become a Buddha in the future.

However, this does not mean that the gradual practices of the bodhisattva stages are not necessary. Indeed, Fazang writes that the bodhisattva, after having reached the initial stages of faith, still must transverse the remaining bodhisattva stages. This is because all stages retain their particularity even while being wholly interfused, and because buddha-nature must be nourished by training on the bodhisattva stages.

== Bibliography ==
- Chen, Jinhua (2007). Philosopher, Practitioner, Politician: The many lives of Fazang (643–712). Leiden: Brill. ISBN 978-90-04-15613-5.
