= Xingce =

Chinese Buddhist Pure Land monk of the Qing dynasty

Xingce (行策, 1626–1682), was a Pure Land Buddhist monk during the early Qing dynasty who is now considered to be the tenth patriarch of the Pure Land school.

== Overview ==
Born under the courtesy name Jieliu in the Yixing region of Jiangsu. Xingce's father Quanchang was respected Confucian scholar in the Jiang family who was a friend of Hanshan Deqing. After his parents passed away, Xingce became a monk at twenty three at Li’an Temple in Wulin (Zhejiang) under venerable Ruo’an Wen. He practiced meditation rigorously for five years, undertaking the ascetic practice of remaining seated in meditation through the night without lying down. Following the passing of his teacher Ruo’an, Xingce moved to Bao’en Temple, where he met his friend Master Xi’an Ying, who encouraged him to devote himself to Pure Land. Later, he studied Tiantai under Master Qiaoshi of Qiantang, with whom he practiced the Lotus Sutra Samādhi.

In 1663, Master Xingce built a thatched hut on a small islet in the Xixi River near Fahua Mountain in Hangzhou. He named his residence Lian’an (Lotus Hermitage). There he devoted himself exclusively to nianfo and chanting the Pure Land sutras for six years, attaining the nianfo samadhi. In 1670, he moved to Puren Monastery on Mount Yu, where he led a group of monastics and lay followers in Pure Land practice, advocated the establishment of Lotus Societies, and led numerous seven-day communal nianfo retreats open to lay and monastic alike. During these seven day retreats, practitioners recited the Buddha's name with a single aspiration for rebirth in the Pure Land. This practice allowed many lay Buddhists from various social strata, who could not reside permanently in monasteries, to engage in intensive collective Pure Land practice for a short period. This format is widely recognized as the origin of the Seven-day Nianfo Retreat (Da Fó Qī) tradition that flourished from the Qing Dynasty onward.

Master Xingce also once led a three-year Buddha-recitation retreat. He wrote the Guidelines for the Seven-Day Retreat of Single-Minded and Diligent Buddha Recitation.

Xingce also wrote a refutation of a Chinese Christian tract (known as the Pi Wang) that had been circulating at the time. Xingce's refutation is called the Pi Wang Pi Lueshuo, but this text is now lost.

Master Xingce passed away at Puren Monastery in 1682, at the age of fifty-five. For his tireless efforts in propagating Pure Land, Xingce was recognized by modern Pure Land master Yinguang as the Tenth Patriarch of the Chinese Pure Land School.

== Teaching ==
Master Xingce's main work is Admonishing Words on the Pure Land (Jìngtǔ Jǐngyǔ). Here he outlines the essential principles of the central Pure Land practice of nianfo. According to Xingce, Pure Land faith relies both on the insight into the non-duality of our mind and the Buddha, as well as on our understanding of the vast gulf between our current state and actual enlightenment, which necessitates renouncing this defiled world and earnestly aspiring for rebirth in the Pure Land of Amitabha. In teaching Pure Land to others, Master Xingce emphasized that among the three key provisions of Faith, Vow, and Practice, True Faith was paramount. In his essay Exhortation to Develop True Faith, he states that the main reason that people do not attain birth in the pure land is their lack of genuine true faith.

In explaining what constitutes genuine faith in the pure land path he argues it is threefold:

1. One must understand that the nature of Mind, the Buddha, and sentient beings are non-dual and without distinction.
2. Secondly, one must understand that we are only Buddha's in principle, and in name only, whereas Amitabha is the Ultimate Buddha. Thus, although we and Amitabha are non-dual in our true nature (Buddha-nature), our the gulf between our realization is as distant as heaven and earth.
3. Finally, one must understand that even though we are bound by heavy karmic obstructions, we are beings within the very mind of Amitabha. Likewise, though Amitabha has numerous inconceivable virtues and dwells in a realm billions of buddha-lands away from ours, he is also the Buddha within our own minds.

Thus, his teaching involves maintaining a sense of the non-duality of ourselves with Buddha along with a sense of revulsion for this world and a desire to be born in the Pure Land. This is the mind of revulsion and aspiration which constitute the two aspects of the vow to be born in the Pure Land.

In guiding others in the seven-day recitation retreat practice, Master Xingce also wrote:

In seven days of upholding the name, the essential point is single-mindedness, uninterrupted and undefiled. It is not necessarily superior to recite quickly or many times. Rather, without sluggishness or haste, maintain the practice continuously and minutely. Ensure that each phrase of the Buddha's name is distinct and clear in the mind. While dressing, eating, walking, standing, sitting, or lying down, let the one great name be continuous and unbroken, just like breathing. Neither scattered nor dull. This kind of upholding the name is what is called 'single-minded vigor on the phenomenal level.' With single-minded vigor in recitation on the phenomenal level, rebirth is certainly assured. If one can further realize the principle of Buddha-recitation and achieve single-minded vigor on the noumenal level, then phenomena and principle are perfectly interfused, rebirth is unimpeded, and one's lotus grade will naturally be high.

== Works ==
Master Xingce's writings focus primarily on Pure Land Buddhism, his key works are:

- Admonishing Words on the Pure Land (Jìngtǔ Jǐngyǔ)
- Commentary on the Chapter of the Perfect Penetration of Mahāsthāmaprāpta (Shìzhì Yuántōng Zhāng Jiě)
- Collection from the Lotus Treasury (Lián Zàng Jí)
