= Ci'en Temple =

Ci'en Temple (Chinese: 慈恩寺; pinyin: Cí'ēn Sì) may refer to:

- Daci'en Temple, in Xi'an, Shanxi, China
- Ci'en Temple (Zhejiang), on Mount Tiantai, in Tiantai County, Zhejiang, China
- Ci'en Temple (Hubei), in Suizhou, Hubei, China
- Ci'en Temple (Liaoning), in Shenyang, Liaoning, China
- Ci'en Temple (Guangdong), in Chaoshan District of Shantou, Guangdong, China
