= Perfect Interpenetration =

East Asian Buddhist philosophical concept

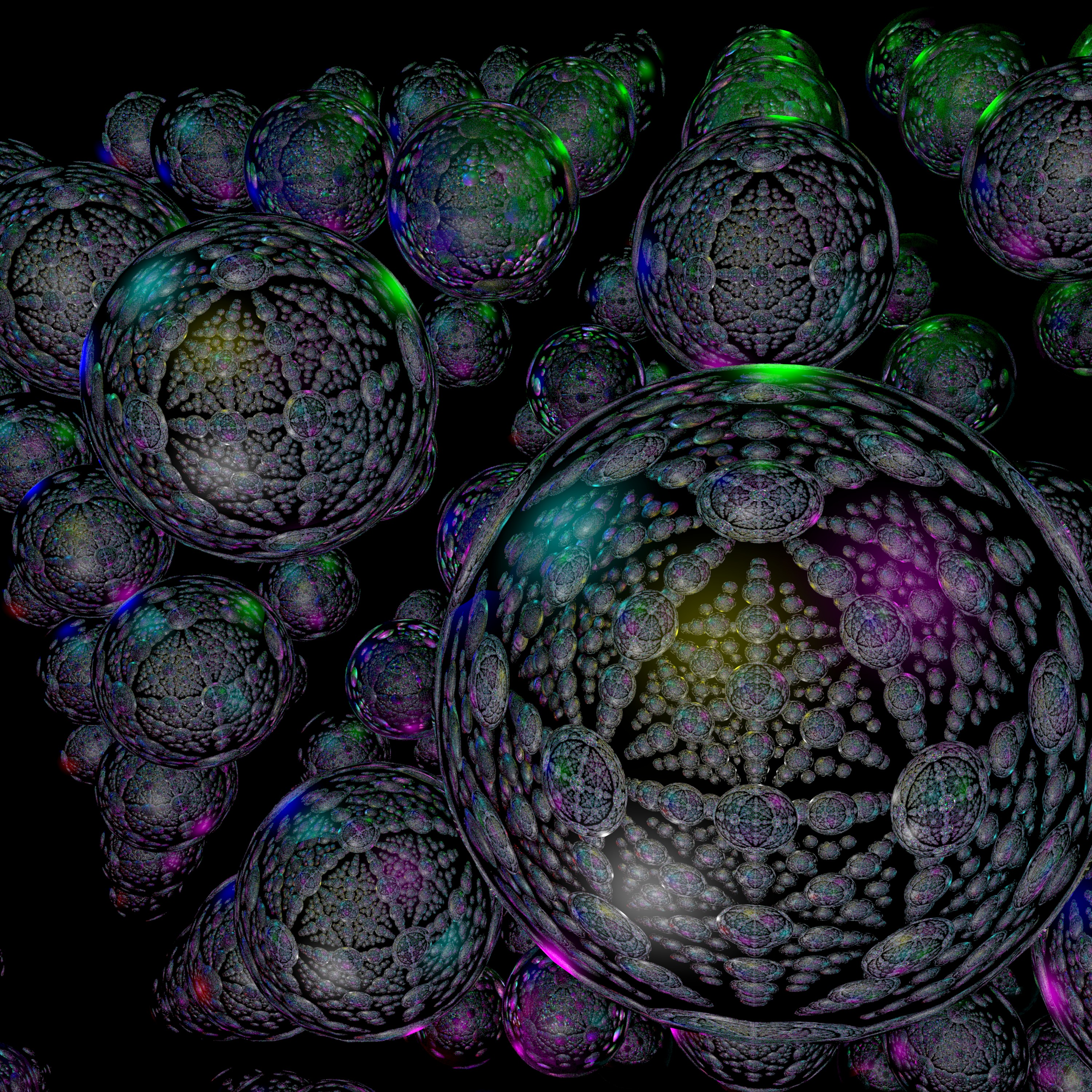
A modern illustration of the popular metaphor of Indra's net, showing how each individual phenomenon includes the whole.

Perfect Interpenetration, interconnectedness or complete interfusion is a key philosophical concept in East Asian Buddhism, which was most prominently developed within the Huayan and Tiantai schools. It describes a kind of holism that sees every individual phenomenon (Sanskrit: dharma, Chinese: 事 shi) in the universe as simultaneously containing the entirety of all other phenomena, while also being contained within every other phenomenon. According to this view, this state of interpenetration exists without each phenomenon losing its individual identity in an undifferentiated monism.

The root of the East Asian idea of interpenetration is found in the Buddhist theories of Pratītyasamutpāda (dependent co-arising), emptiness and in the Mahayana doctrine of non-duality (advaya) as found in texts like the Avatamsaka Sutra. Though initially developed in the Huayan and Tiantai schools, the concept influenced all major traditions of East Asian Buddhism, including Chan / Zen and Pure Land. The idea is often illustrated through the influential metaphor of Indra's net popularized by the authors of the Huayan school.

Various traditional Chinese Buddhist terms are used to describe the idea that all things are interpenetrated, including interpenetration (Chinese: 通達; pinyin: tōngdá, from Sanksrit: prativedha), perfect interfusion (圓融; yuánróng), unobstructed perfect interfusion (圓融無礙), and mutual inclusion (互具; hu ju). Western scholars often use terms like interconnectedness, interpenetration and interbeing, the last term having been coined by the modern Zen teacher Thich Nhat Hanh.

The doctrine of interpenetration is often used as a bridge between Buddhist metaphysics and practical ethics. By realizing that all beings are inextricably linked, the practitioner is led toward universal compassion. This is because the suffering and happiness of a single individual is seen as inseparable from the suffering of the whole, and vice versa. In the modern era, the idea has become widespread in Buddhist modernist discourse, which emphasizes the ethical, environmental and political implications of the doctrine. It is frequently cited in discussions regarding Buddhist ecology and engaged Buddhism, where it provides a spiritual framework for understanding the deep ecological interdependence of the natural world and human beings.

== In East Asian Buddhism ==
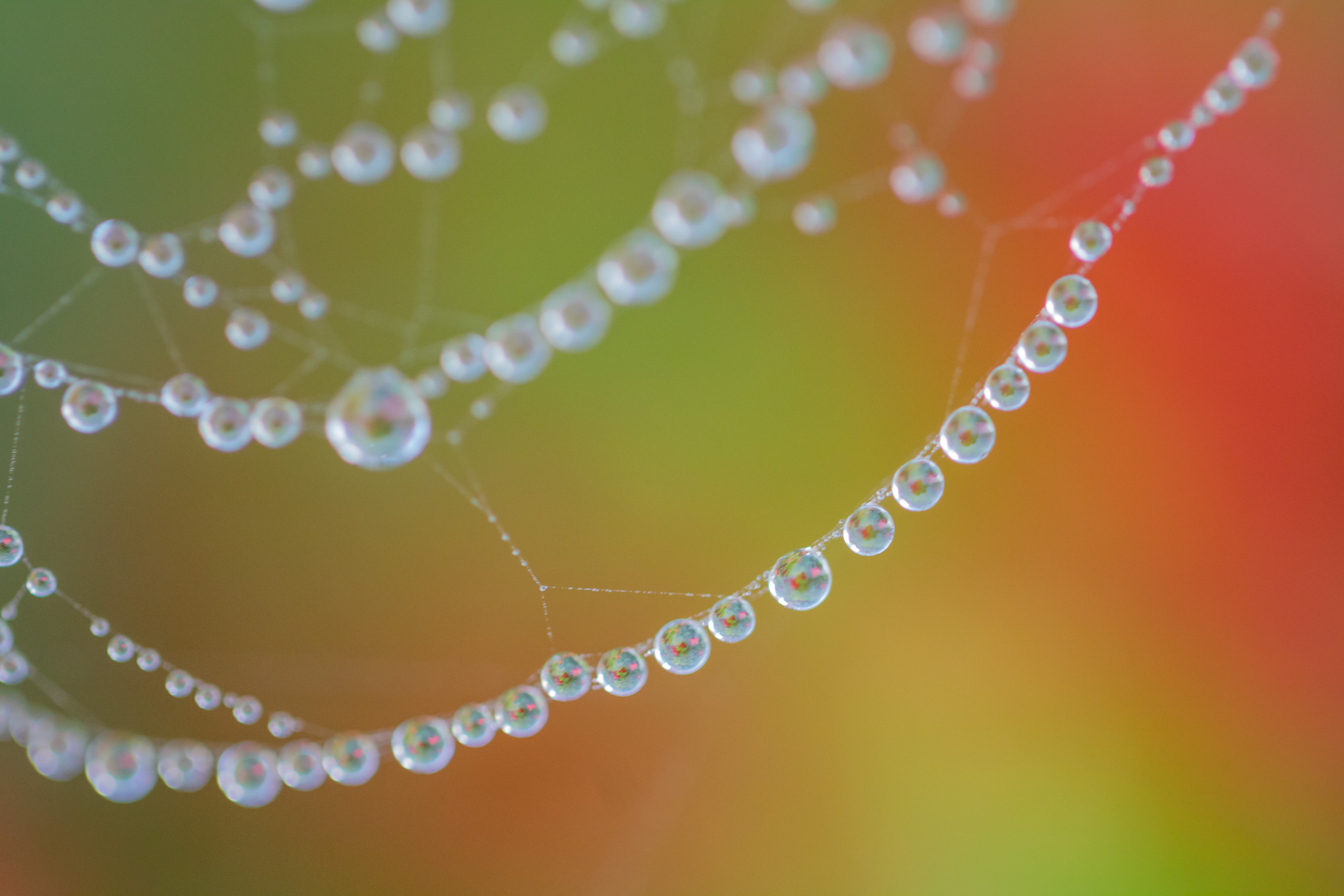
Alan Watts used the image of dew drops on a spiderweb reflecting each other to explain the East Asian view of interpenetration.

The Chinese Buddhist philosophical idea that everything is connected to everything began to develop during the Sui and Tang dynasties (581–907 CE), a period that has been seen as a golden age for Chinese Buddhism. The source of these ideas are found in Indian Mahayana writings on emptiness (especially in the works of Nagarjuna) and in key Mahayana sutras like the Avatamsaka Sutra. These ideas were synthesized and developed further by Chinese Buddhist philosophers like Zhiyi (c. 538–597 CE), Jizang (c. 549–623), Dushun (c. 557–640) and Fazang (c. 643–712) into complex metaphysical doctrines of holistic interpenetration.

Apart from drawing on Indic Mahayana sources, Chinese Buddhist writings on interpenetration may have also drawn inspiration from native Chinese sources. Charles Muller notes that writings like the I Ching, Analects, Tao Te Ching, and Chuang Tzu accept "a worldview in which the thoughts and actions of an individual penetrate, and carry influence throughout the entire world." Confucian and Daoist sources also use the terms 通 tōng and 達 dá, both of which could mean "apprehend," "understand," "grasp," "permeate," "fill," or "influence."

=== Huayan ===
The Huayan (Avatamsaka) school is particularly known for its development of the theory of interpenetration, which is also known as "perfect interfusion" (圓融; yuanrong), the non-obstruction of phenomena (事事無礙; shishi wu’ai), and "the dependent arising of the whole realm of phenomena" (法界緣起, fajie yuanqi; Sanskrit: dharmadhatu pratityasamutpada). This doctrine is central to Huayan thought and is described in various ways throughout the writings of Chinese Huayan scholars, dating back to the founder of the school, Dushun. Muller explains that the Chinese binome 通達 tōngdá "indicates both passing through that which is already open, and piercing through that which has been heretofore closed."

Huayan masters like Fazang and Chengguan developed this theory out of their interpretation of the doctrine of emptiness and their reading of the Avatamsaka Sutra. For them, all phenomena (dharmas) are mutually dependent on and interfused with each other as well as with the entire set of dharmas in the universe (the Dharmadhatu, "dharma realm"). As such, any individual dharma only exists as part of the cosmos as an interconnected nexus of dharmas, a system in which each dharma contains all other dharmas. This is described by Fazang with the phrases "one is many, many is one" (yi ji duo, duo ji yi) and "one in many, many in one" (yi zhong duo, duo zhong yi), which refers to how any dharma penetrates and is penetrated by the totality of all things. As Bryan Van Norden describes this theory, "because the identity of any one thing is dependent on the identities of other things, 'one is all,' and because the whole is dependent for its identity on its parts, 'all is one.'"

While the Avatamsaka Sutra does not itself expound the theory of interfusion as taught in Huayan, there are numerous passages which describe how each individual particle contains countless worlds within them, such as the following:

If untold Buddha-lands are reduced to atoms,
In one atom are untold lands, and as in one, so in each.
The atoms to which these Buddha-lands are reduced in an instant are unspeakable,
And so are the atoms of continuous reduction moment to moment, going on for untold eons;
These atoms contain lands unspeakably many, and the atoms in these lands are even harder to tell of.

The idea may also have been influenced by the Gaṇḍavyūha Sūtra's climax scene in Vairocana's Tower. In this passage, the sutra's protagonist Sudhana enters a towered temple hall (kūṭāgāra) and sees that the inside of it is vast as the sky, containing hundreds of thousands of other kūṭāgāras that coexist without obstructing each other. Inside, he witnesses bodhisattvas (including Maitreya) entering samādhi, emitting countless transformation bodies from their skin pores, and hearing melodious Buddhist teachings emanating from every pore. In one especially magnificent tower, he perceives the entire Buddhist cosmos in one single glance, and within each world, he observes Maitreya's birth, descent to earth, and the key events of his final existence. As the Gaṇḍavyūha Sūtra's fifty fourth chapter states:

He saw within the kūṭāgāra another hundred thousand with this kind of an array of adornments: adorned by countless precious parasols, banners, and flags, and so on, adorned by countless perfect excellent qualities. He saw that all those kūṭāgāras were in that way vast, immense, and immeasurable; were treasuries of space; and had been completely, beautifully adorned. He saw that these kūṭāgāras were perfectly arranged so that in a single perception they appeared in the manner of reflections that were separate from one another, not mingled with one another, and distinct from one another, and so that they appeared with all of them without exception being perceived in a single perception.

Furthermore, a common theme of the Avatamsaka Sutra is how the Buddha's Dharma is "one" or singular, while the perceptions and understandings of all sentient beings are manifold. This is likened to how a luminous pearl can contain many reflections, and is used to explain how the Buddha's realm of nirvana manifests and suffuses all of samsara (highlighting the Mahayana doctrine of the non-duality of samsara and nirvana). These ideas led to Chinese exegetical discussions on the unity between the one (yi 一) and the many (duo 多) (as seen in Zhiyan's phrase “One is all” 一即一切), as well as further developments of the closely related Chinese philosophical theories like essence-function and the relationship between the ultimate principle (li) and the myriad phenomena (shi) — all of which were seen as interdependent and interconnected.

The Huayan theory of interpenetration was first presented in Dushun’s Threefold Discernment of the Dharmadhatu which provides a progressive meditative framework for understanding reality which moves from the classic Mahayana view of emptiness to a radical vision of cosmic interpenetration. Dushun begins with the first discernment, which establishes the classic identity between form and emptiness. The second discernment introduces the distinctive Huayan categories of li 理 (universal principle) and shi 事 (particular phenomena), arguing that these two dimensions of reality are mutually non-obstructive and pervade one another like water and waves. The third and highest discernment completely transcends the dualism of the ultimate principle and myriad phenomena, focusing on the total pervasion of shi with shi. In this final stage, reality is viewed as a groundless, center-less, fractal web where every individual dharma fully contains and is contained by every other thing in the universe.

The Huayan teaching of interpenetration is depicted through various metaphors, such as Indra's net, an infinite cosmic net that contains a multifaceted jewel at each vertex, with each jewel being reflected in all of the other jewels, ad infinitum. Thus, each jewel contains the entire net of jewels reflected within. This idea was also first described by the first patriarch Dushun who writes in his Calming and Contemplation in the Five Teachings of Huayan (Huayan wujiao zhiguan 華嚴五教止觀, T1867):

The manner in which all dharmas interpenetrate is like an imperial net of celestial jewels extending in all directions infinitely, without limit. … As for the imperial net of heavenly jewels, it is known as Indra’s Net, a net which is made entirely of jewels. Because of the clarity of the jewels, they are all reflected in and enter into each other, ad infinitum. Within each jewel, simultaneously, is reflected the whole net. Ultimately, nothing comes or goes. If we now turn to the southwest, we can pick one particular jewel and examine it closely. This individual jewel can immediately reflect the image of every other jewel.

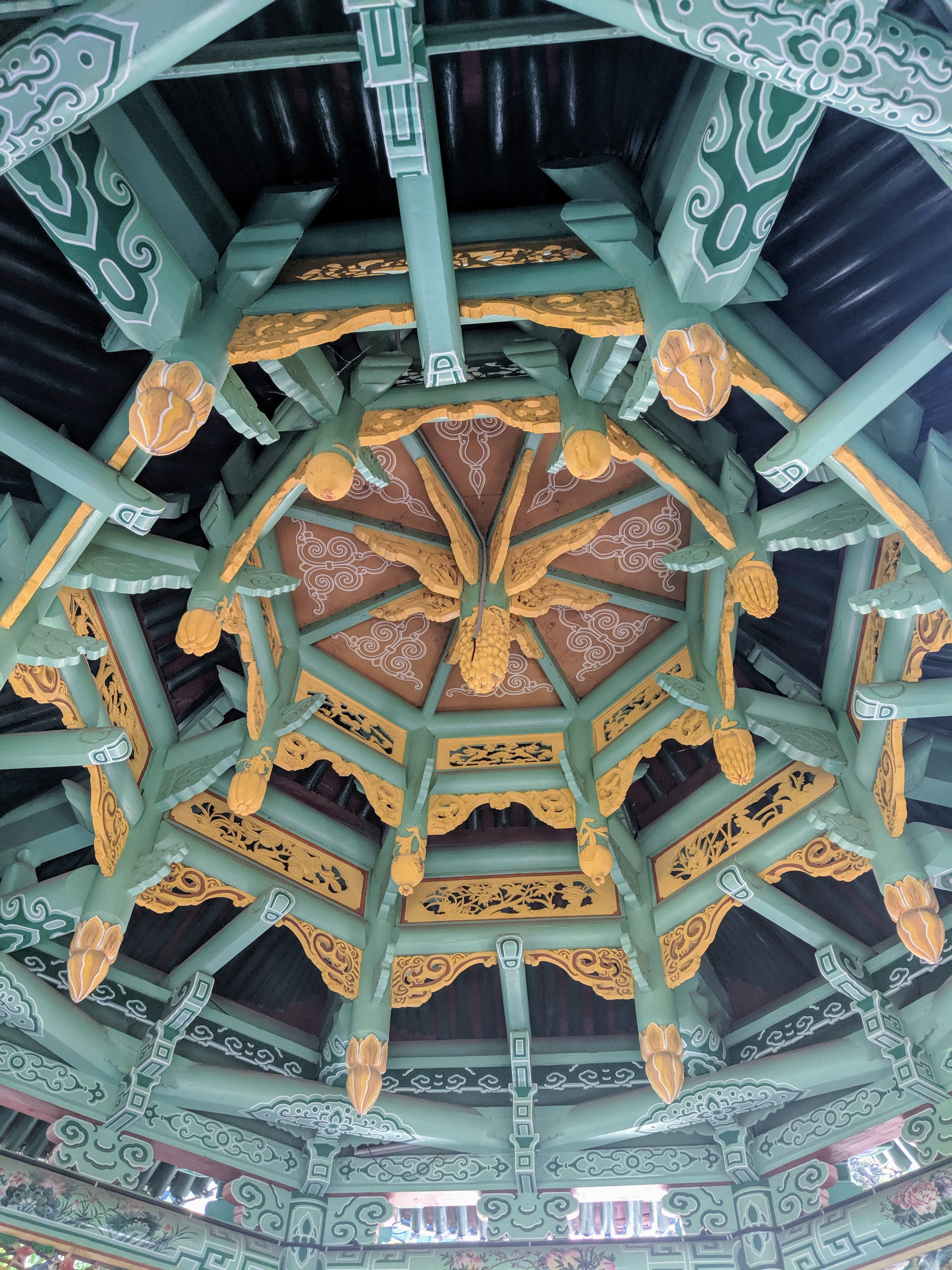
Photo of the ceiling of Ci'en Temple (Liaoning), depicting an intricate system of rafters.

Another popular metaphor is the rafter-building metaphor which can be found in Fazang's famous "Rafter Dialogue." This is found in the Huayan Wujiao Zhang 華嚴五教章 (Treatise on the Five Teachings, T.45.1866), where Fazang states:

The rafter is the building. Why? Because the rafter by itself establishes the building. Without the rafter, the building is not established. When there is the rafter, there is the building...Question: Why would there be no building if a single rafter is absent? Answer: That would be a spoiled building, not a perfect building. Therefore, you should know that the perfect building is inherent in the one rafter. Since it is inherent in this one rafter, you should know that the rafter is the building....Question: Since the building is the rafter, then the planks, roof tiles, etc. should also be the rafter? Answer: They all are the rafter. Why? Without the rafter, there would be no building. If there is no rafter, the building is spoiled. If the building is spoiled, then you cannot speak of the planks, roof tiles, etc. Hence, the planks, roof tiles, etc. are the rafter. If they were not the rafter, the building could not be established. The rafter, tiles, etc. could not be established. Now they are all established, we know they are identical with each other.

According to Fazang, any rafter (any part) is essential to the existence of its building (standing in for the universe, the dharmadhatu). Likewise, the identity and existence of any rafter is also dependent on it being part of a building. Therefore, any phenomenon is necessarily dependent upon all phenomena in the universe. Philosophers like Graham Priest and Li Kang interpret this argument as being based on the notion of definitional identity. Each part of a whole contributes to defining what the whole is. The absence of any part of a thing means that the whole thing is no longer the same thing without that individual part. Yet another example used to illustrate interpenetration is that of a hall of mirrors arranged in an octagon so they each reflect each other. Fazang was said to have constructed such a hall of mirrors as a way to teach interpenetration. Huayan patriarch Qingliang Chengguan explained the example as follows:

If we use the example of the ten mirrors (arrayed in a circle or sphere so that all face all the others) as a simile [for phenomenal interpenetration], one mirror is the one, nine mirrors are the many [...] one mirror includes in it reflections of nine mirrors, meaning that one mirror is that which includes and nine mirrors are that which is included—yet because the nine mirrors also are that which includes (because they contain the reflection of the one mirror), the aforementioned one mirror which includes also enters the nine mirrors, so one mirror enters the nine mirrors.

While Chengguan upheld the non-obstruction of phenomenon and phenomenon (shi shi wu ai 事事無礙) as the highest teaching, he nonetheless emphasized the non-obstruction of the absolute and phenomena (li shi wu ai 理事無礙) as that which made the non-obstruction of all phenomena possible. That is, it is only because all phenomena are formed from the same absolute principle (li 理) that they do not obstruct one another. Brook Ziporyn also observes that later Huayan thought, as exemplified by Chengguan and Zongmi, emphasized an absolute Pure Mind as the ground of all phenomenal appearance and interpenetration. This ground is Awareness (知 zhi) as the substance of mind that is free of thoughts (念 nian). It is not the same as the ordinary consciousness of discrimination. Rather, pure awareness is the "illumination" which does not rise and fall with discrete thought-moments, and is not limited by any finite condition. As Ziporyn explains, according to this later Huayan view:

This illumination, which is the pure and ever‑present essence of mind, is itself precisely “nonobstruction between events,” interpervasion as such, what presences and unifies all particular things, is in its essence undifferentiated and interpenetrative, and this Mind as such, unchanging awareness, is the coherence of things (omnipresent unifying totality of all interpenetrative particulars) which must be realized in order to realize enlightenment—in other words, Mind as such is Li.

=== Tiantai ===
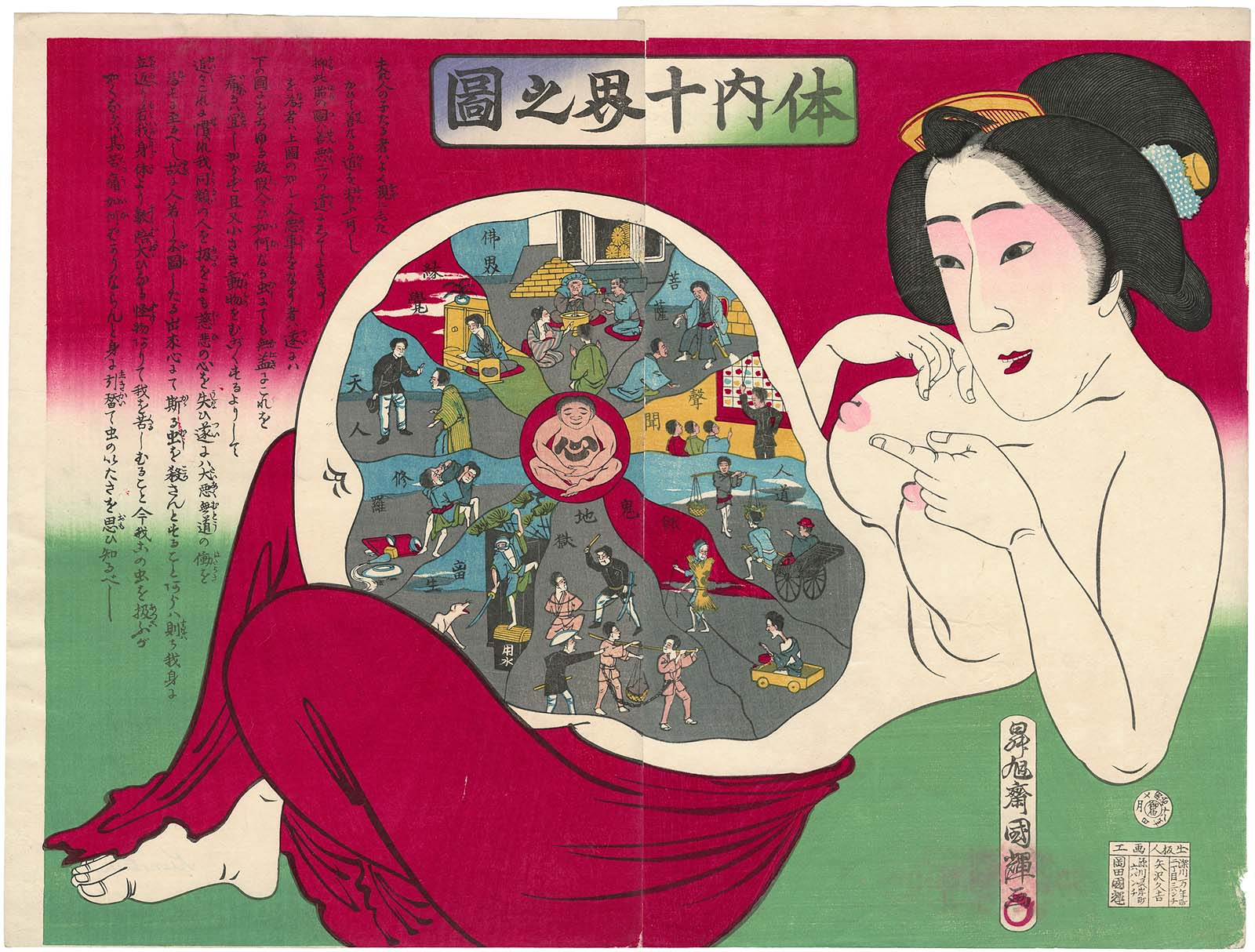
Japanese depiction of the ten realms as contained in the mind of a fetus

The Chinese Tiantai school also developed a theory of interpenetration in parallel with the developments in the Huayan school. The Tiantai school develops its interpenetration theory from the philosophy of its central founding figure, Zhiyi, as well as from its readings of the Mahayana Sutras, especially the Lotus Sutra. Tiantai authors use terms such as "mutual containment" (相攝, Skt. anyonya-samavasaraṇa), "mutual inclusion" (互具; hu ju), "nature inclusion" (性具; xing ju) or "inherent inclusion" (本具; ben ju) to describe their view of the interpenetration of all phenomena. For Tiantai scholars, this meant that any individual phenomenon (dharma) includes or entails every other phenomenon. This holism also entails that each phenomenon includes the entirety of the ultimate truth (and vice versa, that the ultimate truth includes all other particular phenomena). This view that "everything contains everything else, and the whole contains all things" was also termed "the interinclusiveness of the ten realms" and "the interpenetrating unity of all aspects of reality".

According to Brook Ziporyn, the Tiantai school's view of interfusion is derived from a passage in the Chinese translation of the Lotus Sutra which states (key section bolded for emphasis):

Only a Buddha together with a Buddha knows the ultimate reality of all things: how they appear, what their natures are, what they're made of, what they are capable of, what they are doing, what their causes are, what their conditions are, what their effects are, what their consequences are, and the way in which all these factors from beginning to end are equally ultimate and are ultimately one and the same.

According to modern Buddhist studies scholar Brook Ziporyn, Tiantai authors interpret this passage as pointing to how "each particular aspect of the world as we see it and feel it is ultimately real, that each one is in fact the Absolute itself, the Buddha-nature, the final fact about the universe," and also how "each thing, each appearance, each action" is "the ultimate reality "of " all other things".

The foundational thinker of the Tiantai school, Zhiyi, saw the teaching of mutual inclusion as being entailed by the doctrine of emptiness, dependent arising and the threefold truth (his own reworking of Nagarjuna's two truths). Zhiyi writes in his Móhē Zhǐguān: "If one relies on the circumstances of deluded attachment and discrimination, then phenomena are not mutually contained. But if one relies on the function of the dependent arising of the mind-nature, then there can be mutual containment (相攝)." According to Zhiyi, the third truth of the Middle (which is the non-duality of the conventional and the ultimate truths) transcends and includes all extremes, such as self and other, "inside" or "outside", whole or part, the one and the many. As such, any specific phenomenon cannot be ultimately separate from all others and thus "entails" or includes all other phenomena.

According to Li Kang, Zhiyi derives his view of interpenetration from Nagarjuna's doctrine of emptiness, which says that all phenomena exist only as conventional conceptual constructs (prajñaptis). If this is the case, then the boundaries between all individual things are not inherent, substantial or fixed. Since there is no inherent boundary between phenomena, then there is no ultimate separation between things, and so, all things are interpenetrating. Zhiyi thus relies on the view of emptiness to establish conventionality of boundaries to establish the nonseparateness of all things. It is like how the boundaries between the five oceans are merely conventional.

Zhiyi further explains interpenetration with the phrase: "a single thought [or “one mind”] comprises the ten dharma-realms" (一念三千 yīniàn sānqiān). According to this teaching, each of the ten realms of Buddhist cosmology contains / possesses (具; ju) all other realms. Furthermore each realm (or phenomenon) contains all others or "inherently entails" all others, hence they are "mutually inclusive". In explaining this view, Zhiyi's Móhē Zhǐguān explicitly rejects two specific interpretations:

But it cannot be said that one single thought is before, and that all dharmas are after. Nor can it be said that all dharmas are before, and that one single thought is after… If one single thought gives rise to all dharmas, it is vertical. If one single thought contains all dharmas at a time, it is horizontal. It cannot be vertical. Nor can it be horizontal.

Thus, the Tiantai position is not that there is any single phenomenon that generates all dharmas, nor is there a single phenomenon that contains all dharmas within it as its parts. Instead, Zhiyi claims "It is just that one single thought shi 是 (is) all dharmas. All dharmas shi (are) one single thought." This is true even though "each of the ten dharma (realms) has its own causes and own results. They are not mixed or confused with the others; therefore, they are called “ten dharma realms." Furthermore, Zhiyi also writes that one single thought and all dharmas are "neither identical nor distinct".

As Brook Ziporyn explains, for Zhiyi, each thing or thought has a kind of potential which can be "opened up" to reveal all other things; every thing leads to everything else, and so "the whole is present in each part; every particular is itself the whole". Thus we can say that "one short thought contains all of reality" and that "the Buddha and ordinary worldlings, body and mind, cause and effect, subject and object, sentient and non-sentient are mutually encompassed in every moment of thought."

Further maxims which are influential in Tiantai Buddhism as ways of discussing the implications of interpenetration include: "afflictions (kleśa) are precisely enlightenment (bodhi)," "saṃsāra is precisely nirvāṇa," "sentient beings are precisely original enlightenment," and "this sahā world is precisely the [pure] land of silent illumination". However, Ziporyn notes that the Tiantai view does not mean that each phenomenon literally contains every thing else, but that "as a sound is contained in a musical instrument", each phenomenon has the same nature (Chn. xing), which can lead to, connect to or become all other things. As such, while we can say that all phenomena entail all other phenomena, they don't contain all phenomena pre-existent within it. This would be a non-Buddhist view called satkaryavada which existed in India and is explicitly rejected in Mahayana Buddhist philosophy. Ziporyn describes the Tiantai view of reality which holds to the mutual inclusion of the whole in each individual thing as an "omnicentric holism". In this view, no phenomenon has a clear singular identity of its own. Instead, each thing is a nexus of all other things and exists in an infinitely multi-sided way. Furthermore, no single phenomenon is an exclusive core or foundation of reality, all phenomena are ontological equal. Nevertheless, in spite of this mutual interfusion, individual phenomena do not lose their particular individuality and functioning as conventional truths.

Ziporyn points out that an important difference between Tiantai and Huayan concerns their understanding of absolute principle (li 理). In Tiantai, any particular dharma or event can also be viewed as being a particular li in a multitude of lis. As such, in Tiantai, not only do all events (shi 事) interpenetrate, but so too do all lis. In Huayan, on the other hand, one cannot speak of the interpenetration of li and li. This is because, for Huayan, li as the absolute principle necessarily cannot be multiple. Another unique feature of the Tiantai school is the doctrine of inherent evil (xing e). According to the Tiantai view, since all dharmas are inherently included in each other, evil must be inherent in the absolute or buddha-nature. This was an important doctrine for Siming Zhili (960–1028), who argued against the Chan and Huayan view of a fundamentally pure mind as the ontological ground of reality. Moreover, for Zhili, mind does not possess any special status among dharmas. That is, since all dharmas are on equal footing, any dharma such as a speck of dust, a sound, or smell, can equally be thought of as being the "source" of all others. Also, as each dharma is equally absolute, in Zhili's view, mind cannot be privileged over physical form.

=== Sanlun (Chinese Madhyamaka) ===
The Chinese Madhyamaka school (known as Sanlun) also saw the development of a theory of interpenetration or mutual dependence (相待; xiang dai), based on Nagarjuna's theory of emptiness, which sees all conventional phenomena as conceptual imputation. The idea is developed in the works of the Sanlun philosopher Jizang (549–623). In the Erdi Yi 二諦義 (Meaning of the Two Truths, T.45.1854), Jizang explains mutual dependence as follows:

The original meaning of mutual dependence requires mutual revelation and mutual establishment. For example, long and short are mutually dependent. Without short, there is no long; without long, there is no short. Long reveals what is short, and short reveals what is long. This is called mutual dependence.

This is a mutual dependence of particular characteristics. But Jizang's Erdi Yi also discusses a more general type of mutual dependence between seemingly unrelated things:

Shi (is) and fei (is not) are mutually dependent. Vase depends on non-vase. (Non-vase depends on vase.) If so, a piece of clothing is a non-vase; since non-vase depends on vase, a piece of clothing depends on a vase. Once a piece of clothing depends on a vase, then a vase and a piece of clothing are (each other’s) causes and conditions. A piece of clothing embodies the meaning of a vase, and a vase embodies the meaning of a piece of clothing. Once a piece of clothing embodies the meaning of a vase, all things embody the meaning of a vase.

According to Kang, the basic argument here is that opposing concepts mutually depend on each other, and that for any two things, there will always be opposing concepts that apply to each thing which mutually depend on each other. The argument posits that if the concepts defining two objects are mutually dependent, then the objects themselves must share a reciprocal dependence relationship, effectively "embodying" each other's meaning. Since any two arbitrary objects (which in Madhyamaka are prajñaptimatra, "mere conceptual constructs") can be mapped onto such opposing conceptual pairs, Jizang concludes that every individual phenomenon in the universe is inextricably linked to every other, suggesting that any single thing contains the essence of the totality.

=== Chan/Zen ===
East Asian views on mutual interfusion were also influential on the development of the Chan (Zen) tradition, which drew on them to explain the Mahayana concept of nonduality (bu-er 不二). Huayan and Sanlun influences can be found in classic Chan texts such as the Platform Sutra and the Harmony of Difference and Sameness.

Chan masters applied the idea that the universal principle (li, equated with the Buddha mind and Buddha-nature) was entirely immanent within every particular event (shi) to the Chan idea of kensho (Chn. 見性; jianxing), a direct perception of ultimate reality in each mundane thought or moment. For Chan masters like Mazu Daoyi, the interfusion of buddha-nature with all things meant that enlightenment was fully present in daily thoughts or acts like carrying water or chopping wood. The doctrine also served to defend the Chan Buddhist view of the path, which shifted from gradual progression toward "sudden awakening", a sudden realization that Buddhahood was already here and now, interfused with our very mundane existence.

Zongmi (780-841) was particularly influential in marrying Huayan philosophy to Chan Buddhism. His writings emphasize the interpenetration of principle (li) with all phenomena. The Huayan doctrine also influenced the teaching of the Five Ranks, which is found in the Song era Song of the Precious Mirror Samadhi. This text became important for the Caodong Chan school, as well as for later Japanese Zen traditions. The Five Ranks were also commented on by Hakuin (1686-1769), founder of modern Rinzai Zen. Perfect interpenetration also appears in the works of Korean Seon masters like Jinul (1158–1210) and Kihwa (1376–1431), both of whom were influenced by Huayan thought.

Jinul sought to demonstrate the harmony of Chan and the Huayan teachings, arguing that awakening in Chan is the same as what Huayan terms "sudden realization of the dharmadhātu." For Jinul, the non-dual nature possesses two properties by which it accomplishes the perfect interpenetration of all phenomena: [1] the noumenal essence, which refers to the bright and perfect ground of the dharmadhātu; and [2] its phenomenal function, which is the manifestation of the world of sensory objects in all their variety. Since the pure nature and its unimpeded function are inseparable, if one "looks back on the radiance" of one's pure, enlightened nature, one will also realize all phenomena to be in dynamic interaction. As Robert Buswell observes, "Consequently, the ultimate state of the interpenetration of all phenomena is not distinct from the fundamental wisdom inherent in the self nature of all sentient beings; if that nature is recognized through Sŏn practice, the ultimate goal of the Hwaŏm school is realized."

Jinul also explains that awakening to mind is the same as awakening to the interpenetration of all phenomena, since there is nothing which exists outside of the mind. He says:

I had always had doubts about the approach to entering into awakening in the Hwaŏm teachings: what, finally, did it involve? Accordingly, I decided to question a [Hwaŏm] lecturer. He replied, "You must contemplate the unimpeded interpenetration of all phenomena." He entreated me further: "If you merely contemplate your own mind and do not contemplate the unimpeded interfusion of all phenomena, you will never gain the perfect qualities of the fruition of Buddhahood." I did not answer, but thought silently to myself, "If you use the mind to contemplate phenomena, those phenomena will become impediments and you will have needlessly disturbed your own mind; when will there ever be an end to this situation? But if the mind is brightened and your wisdom purified, then one hair and all the universe will be interfused for there is, perforce, nothing which is outside [the mind]."

In addition to connecting perfect interpenetration with Sŏn (Zen) practice and philosophy, some authors also used it to defend classical East Asian Buddhist ethics. For example, Kihwa (who was also a scholar of Confucianism), writes:

Humaneness implies the interpenetration of heaven and earth and the myriad things into a single body, wherein there is no gap whatsoever. If you deeply embody this principle, then there cannot be a justification for inflicting harm on even the most insignificant of creatures.

=== Pure Land ===
Chinese masters often drew on Tiantai and Huayan teachings of interpenetration to explain the nature of the Pure Land Buddhist path and the functioning of Pure Land practices, such as nianfo. Pure Land masters like Yunqi Zhuhong, Ouyi Zhixu and Yinguang argued that because all phenomena are mutually inclusive and interfused, the mind of the nianfo reciter and Amitabha Buddha's mind were fundamentally inseparable and interlinked. Because of this, a single faithful invocation of the nianfo actually activates the Buddha's virtuous qualities in one's mind here and now, and plants seeds for future rebirth in the Pure Land of Sukhavati. Furthermore, due to the interpenetration of all phenomena, reciting the name of Amitabha Buddha fully encompasses all buddhas. As Master Yinguang writes:

You should not think that the merits and virtues of reciting the name of, or visualizing one Buddha are less encompassing than those received from reciting the name of, or visualizing many Buddhas. You should realize that Amitabha Buddha is the Dharma Realm Treasure Body. All the virtues of the Buddhas in the ten directions of the Dharma Realm are fully encompassed in Amitabha Buddha. This is like the jewelled net of Indra, whose thousands and thousands of jewels are fully reflected in one jewel, the image of one jewel is reflected in thousands and thousands of jewels, and each and every jewel encompasses every other, in perfect, unimpeded fashion.

This doctrine also provides metaphysical foundation for the Pure Land doctrine of ganying, "stimulus-response," in which the practitioner’s "stimulus" (the focused chanting of nianfo) and the Buddha’s "response" (the compassionate vow to save all beings) are not separate distinct things. Because the practitioner’s mind and Amitabha’s Pure Land interpenetrate without obstruction, the act of calling upon the Buddha is able to collapses the distinctions between the mundane world of samsara and the pure land. Likewise, according to masters like Yuan Hongdao, the single easy practice (nianfo) encompasses and accomplishes all other Buddhist practices due to perfect interfusion. Furthermore, all worlds and realms are interfused with the Pure Land itself. As such, through the doctrine of interpenetration, the pure land was understood as an ever-present dimension which could be accessed by means of faith and nianfo practice, which allows us to become aligned with the interfusion of the Buddha and sentient beings.

== Thích Nhất Hạnh's Interbeing ==
Thích Nhất Hạnh, a prominent Vietnamese Zen Buddhist teacher, coined the term interbeing (French: Interêtre, Vietnamese: Tiếp Hiện) to explain Buddhist interpenetration metaphysics to modern people and help them develop some insight into the Buddhist view of reality. Though he was deeply versed in the complex doctrines of Huayan and Yogacara, Nhat Hanh’s presentation of interbeing is noted for its elegant simplicity which focuses on natural explanations and ethics. Nhat Hanh’s explanations relies on stories and simple metaphors to convey the notion that all things exist in a state of interconnected being, a state of being interwoven and mutually dependent. In his book Understanding our Mind, Thích Nhất Hạnh cites the Avatamsaka Sutra and the teachings of Huayan master Fazang as the sources for his teaching of interbeing.

Thích Nhất Hạnh's teaching on interbeing restates the traditional concepts of emptiness and non-self. In short, everything depends for its existence on everything else. As such, Nhat Hanh teaches that to be "empty" is also to be "full of everything else." He uses simple examples like a flower or a sheet of paper. For example, regarding a simple sheet of paper, he writes:

Everything—time, space, the earth, the rain, the minerals in the soil, the sunshine, the cloud, the river, the heat, and even consciousness—is in that sheet of paper. Everything coexists with it. To be is to inter-be. You cannot just be by yourself alone; you have to inter-be with every other thing. This sheet of paper is, because everything else is.

For Nhat Hanh, following Huayan Buddhism, since any single flower is empty of a separate, independent self, it is also full of non-flower elements such as sunlight, soil, clouds, water, and minerals. If all these non-flower elements were removed, there would be no flower left. A flower cannot exist independently but it can only exist in relationship with everything else. Nhat Hanh also extends this idea to the concepts of self and not-self:

When we look deeply into nonself, we see that every single thing is possible because of the existence of everything else. We see that everything else is the cause and condition for its existence. We see that everything else is in it. From the point of view of time, we say “impermanence”, and from the point of view of space we say “nonself”.

Nhat Hanh therefore teaches that because all things in flux and in a state of relationship with other things, there is no static, isolated core to anything. His teachings therefore reject any dualism between internal mind and the external world, asserting that the observer and the observed are inextricably linked parts of a singular reality. This concept of interbeing highlights how all psychological and physical phenomena are intertwined, interconnected, interdependent, and mutually influenced in reality and the world. This relationship is vividly illustrated in the Avatamsaka Sutra, which teaches that "everything contains everything else" and "everything penetrates everything else."

=== Role in practice and ethics ===
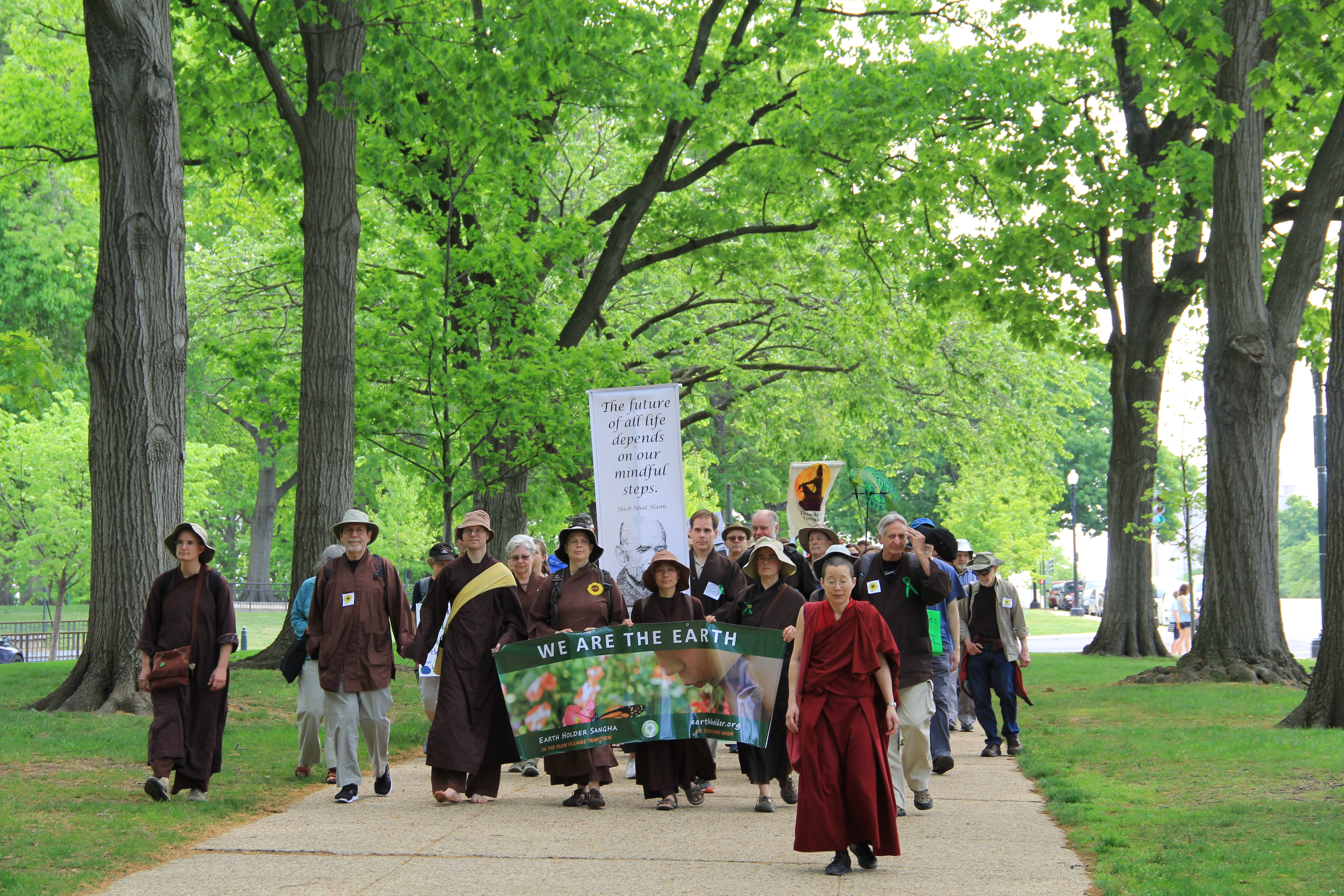
Members of the Earth Holder Sangha practice mindful walking near Capitol Hill's Senate Park during 2017 People's Climate March, the sign includes a quote by Nhat Hanh.

The ethical import of interpenetration is based on the link between individuals and collectives. If the "self" is actually composed of "non-self" elements, then the well-being of any individual is inseparable from the well-being of the environment, society and ultimately the entire cosmos. Thus, a person is composed of many elements beyond their personal self boundary, such as their parents, ancestors, plants, and animals, as well as water, sunlight, food, education, and life experiences. It is only the belief in a separate self that confines us, falsely separating the "I" vs others. As such, if one can see the nature of interbeing between oneself and others, one can see that others' suffering is one's own suffering, and others' happiness is one's own happiness. Thus, Nhat Hanh teaches that harming other people, animals or the ecosystem is a form of self-harm, since there is no ontological boundary separating the two. This realization requires a life of mindfulness in the present moment, where every mundane action like washing a bowl or walking becomes a meditative act of "being peace" in relation to oneself and to the world.

In this way, the view of interbeing functions as a corrective to many deluded harmful concepts that trap human thought, mainly concepts of separation and independence. By dissolving these rigid constructs of the mind and our attachments to them, practitioners of interbeing are invited to return to the immediate experience of the present moment. Nhat Hanh’s teachings therefore emphasize that enlightenment is to be found in this insight into the interconnectedness of all things. Interbeing thus enriches the practice of Zen by framing the Mahayana practices of compassion, mindfulness, and ethical living. It encourages practitioners to extend their awareness beyond the self, to better engage with their environment. Interbeing also supports the idea that mindfulness should extend beyond ourselves to encompass our society and ultimately the whole interconnected web of existence, since well-being is intimately tied to the well-being of others and the environment. This understanding encourages practitioners to act compassionately, reducing suffering not only for themselves but also for all sentient beings. Practitioners are encouraged to be mindful not only of their own thoughts and actions but also of how they affect and are affected by the world around them.

While traditional Zen practice often involves meditation and solitary retreats, interbeing, as an integral part of Nhat Hanh's Engaged Buddhism, also encourages practitioners to be actively engaged in the world and to improve it for the better, bringing meditative insights into activism and environmentalism. Nhat Hanh's Interbeing teaching thus has a heightened environmental awareness, emphasizing that our actions have a direct impact on the natural world and that we are interconnected with all living beings. In response to this awareness, Zen practitioners who embrace interbeing often engage in environmental advocacy and sustainable living as a natural manifestation of their practice.

=== Order of Interbeing and Plum village ===
Thích Nhất Hạnh founded the Order of Interbeing and Plum Village Tradition as new Buddhist movements that work to embody a life of mindfulness of interbeing. The Order of Interbeing comprises monastic and lay practitioners, this community adheres to the philosophy and practice of interconnectedness, emphasizing mindfulness, compassion, and ethical living. Members follow the Fourteen Mindfulness Trainings as ethical guidelines, engage in communal practices, and apply interbeing principles in their daily lives.

Within the Plum Village Tradition, interbeing is seen as an understanding that there is a deep interconnection between all people, all species, and all things. This is based on non-duality, emptiness, and dependent co-arising (all phenomena arise in dependence upon other phenomena). Plum Village does not try to prove the truth of interbeing, but instead emphasizes the importance of recognizing its truth through meditation (generating mindfulness, insight, and concentration). Understanding interbeing is essential for overcoming suffering and reaching enlightenment, which is the ultimate goal in Buddhism. This insight into interbeing helps in particular by revealing that nothing is ever truly created or destroyed, which removes the fear of death or loss. Plum Village, founded in 1982 in France by Thich Nhat Hanh, serves as a central location for tradition. The tradition of Plum Village extends globally through various centers, each committed to promoting the understanding and practice of Interbeing.

== Influence on modern thinkers ==
The concept of interconnectedness and interbeing has influenced a range of modern authors (Buddhist and non-buddhist), philosophers, environmentalists, and thinkers who have drawn on these principles into their work. The concept has also become widespread in modern Buddhist literature. Indeed, according to David McMahan, the idea of interdependence has become a key element of Buddhist modernism, partly because it resonates with "current studies of natural systems, nations, economies, and cultures" which see these as "multifaceted, interdependent processes—networks in which each part is both constituted by and constitutive of larger dynamic systems. That we live in a radically interconnected world has become a truism....Thus any religious tradition that can claim “interdependence” as a central doctrine lays claim to timely cultural resonance and considerable cultural cachet."

The idea of interconnectedness has also influenced various environmental authors and activists, who saw similarities with the theoretical paradigms of systems thinking. Arne Næss was perhaps the first environmentalist philosopher to explicitly draw a connection between the Buddhist theory of interpenetration and deep ecology, which sees sentient beings as being deeply incorporated within the whole environment. Naess's thought seeks to reject the “man-in-environment image in favor of the relational, total-field image”, seeing organisms as "knots in the biospherical net or field of intrinsic relations."

Buddhist teacher and activist Joan Halifax is one example of a modern Buddhist author who draws on the concept and expands to ecology and activism, writing that as Chinese Buddhists saw the entire world as sentient, Buddhism can be seen as a way of connecting deeply with all of existence:

A thing cannot live in isolation; rather, the condition of beingness… implies a vital and transformative interconnectedness, interdependence. And thus one seemingly separate being cannot be without all other beings, and is therefore not a separate self, but part of a greater Self, an ecological Self that is alive and has awareness within its larger Self.

Joanna Macy, an environmental activist and author, has also drawn on Buddhist and ecological insights in her work on systems thinking and deep ecology. Citing the Buddhist concept of interdependence. she emphasizes our connection to ecology need for a "Great Turning," a shift in consciousness towards sustainability and ecological responsibility. According to Macy:

Contemporary science, and systems theory in particular, goes farther in challenging old assumptions about a distinct, separate, continuous self, by showing that there is no logical or scientific basis for construing one part of the experienced world as “me” and the rest as “other.” That is so because as open, self-organizing systems, our very breathing, acting and thinking arise in interaction with our shared world through the currents of matter, energy, and information that move through us and sustain us. In the web of relationships that sustain these activities there is no clear line demarcating a separate, continuous self.

Macy cites the Buddhist conception of interdependence and not-self as going "farther than systems theory in showing the pathogenic character of any reifications of the self." Macy argues that recognizing "our imbeddedness in nature" also leads to further social engagement where "the self [is] widened and deepened so that the protection of nature [is] felt and perceived as protection of our very selves" (here she is quoting Naess). McMahan writes that Macy's work contains all the key elements of "the contemporary Buddhist-Western hybrid conception of interdependence", including links to modern ecological theories, a critique of modern atomistic individualism, the harmonizing expansion of the self to the whole environment, and a call to social engagement.

Numerous other Buddhist and Buddhist influenced environmental activists like Gary Snyder and John Seed cite the idea of interpenetration as an influence in their work linking Buddhism with their environmental activism. David McMahan notes that in some of these modernist figures, the Buddhist concept of interpenetration has been combined with other influences, such as Neo-Pagan and Daoist ideas, Romanticism and American Transcendentalism, becoming an example of a "hybrid concept". As such, the Buddhist modernist idea of interconnectedness has arisen "not only from re-thinking of buddhahood in the Mahāyāna and the infusion of East Asian sensibilities into Buddhism but also from some of the fundamental dynamics of modernity."

Apart from its influence on Buddhist modernism, modern spirituality and environmentalism, the idea has also been taken up by academic authors. Several modern philosophers have been influenced by the East Asian theory of interpenetration, discussing it in their writings. Examples include British philosopher Graham Priest, as well as philosophers Brook Ziporyn, Chien-hsing Ho, Li Kang and Nicholaos Jones. Furthermore, the Buddhist idea of interpenetration has also influenced process philosophers and theologians. Examples include Vincent Shen, who wrote various papers comparing Whitehead with Huayan thought, and Steve Odin, author of Process Metaphysics and Hua-yen Buddhism (1982).

== See also ==
- Holism
- Systems thinking
- Monism
- Pantheism
- Deep Ecology
