= Gandavyuha =

Buddhist Mahayana sutra

Seven Leaves from a Manuscript of the Gandavyuha-sutra, Eastern India, Pala period.

The Gaṇḍavyūha Sūtra (Tib. sdong po bkod pa'i mdo) is a Buddhist Mahayana Sutra of Indian origin dating roughly c. 200 to 300 CE. The term Gaṇḍavyūha is obscure and has been translated variously as Stem Array, Supreme Array, Excellent Manifestation. The Sanskrit gaṇḍi can mean “stem” or “stalk” and “pieces” or “parts” or “sections,” as well as "the trunk of a tree from the root to the beginning of the branches"). Peter Alan Roberts notes that "as the sūtra is composed of a series of episodes in which Sudhana meets a succession of teachers, the intended meaning could well have been 'an array of parts' or, more freely, 'a series of episodes.'" He also notes that the term gaṇḍa can also mean "great" or "supreme" in some circumstances and thus some translators have rendered this compound as Supreme Array. The Chinese translations indicate that the sutra also went by another title in the 7th century (Chinese: 入法界品) which can be reconstructed into Sanskrit as Dharmadhātu-praveśana (Entry into the Dharmadhatu).

The sutra depicts one of the world's most celebrated spiritual pilgrimages, and comprises the 39th chapter of the Buddhāvataṃsaka sutra. The Sutra is described as the "Sudhana's quest for the ultimate truth", as the sutra chronicles the journey of a disciple, Sudhana ("Excellent Riches"), as he encounters various teachings and Bodhisattvas until his journey reaches full circle and he awakens to teachings of the Buddha.

== Overview ==
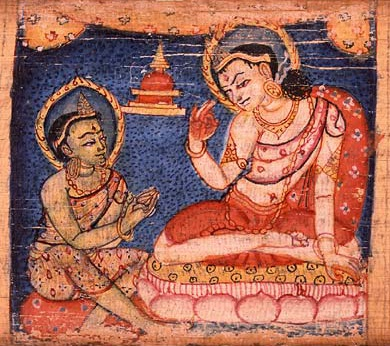
Sudhana learning from one of the fifty-two teachers along his journey toward enlightenment. Sanskrit manuscript, 11-12th century.

In his quest for enlightenment, recounted in the last chapter of the Flower Ornament Scripture, Sudhana would converse with a diverse array of 53 kalyāṇa-mitra (wise advisors), 20 of whom are female, including an enlightened prostitute named Vasumitrā, Gautama Buddha's wife and his mother, a queen, a princess and several goddesses. Male sages include a slave, a child, a physician, and a ship's captain. The antepenultimate master of Sudhana's pilgrimage is Maitreya. It is here that Sudhana encounters the Tower of Maitreya, which — along with Indra's net – is a most startling metaphor for the infinite:

In the middle of the great tower... he saw the billion-world universe... and everywhere there was Sudhana at his feet... Thus Sudhana saw Maitreya's practices of... transcendence over countless eons (kalpa), from each of the squares of the check board wall... In the same way Sudhana... saw the whole supernal manifestation, was perfectly aware of it, understood it, contemplated it, used it as a means, beheld it, and saw himself there.

The penultimate master that Sudhana visits is the Mañjuśrī Bodhisattva, the bodhisattva of great wisdom. Thus, one of the grandest of pilgrimages approaches its conclusion by revisiting where it began. The Gaṇḍavyūha suggests that with a subtle shift of perspective we may come to see that the enlightenment that the pilgrim so fervently sought was not only with him at every stage of his journey, but before it began as well—that enlightenment is not something to be gained, but "something" the pilgrim never departed from.

The final master that Sudhana visits is the bodhisattva Samantabhadra, who teaches him that wisdom only exists for the sake of putting it into practice; that it is only good insofar as it benefits all living beings. Samantabhadra concludes with a prayer of aspiration to buddhahood, which is recited by those who practice according to Atiśa's Bodhipathapradīpa, the foundation of the lamrim textual traditions of Tibetan Buddhism.

== Bhutanese Buddhism ==
In a November 1, 2016 article in the Bhutanese newspaper Kuensel mention was made of the annual Moenlam (or Monlam in Tibetan language) as performed by the Drukpa Kagyu denomination of Buddhism.

During this Moenlam a prayer is said that stems from the Gaṇḍavyūha. The Himalayan traditions use the translation made by Shiksananda, not the earlier version of Buddhabhadra. The last four lines of the Gaṇḍavyūha, as translated by Th. Cleary the text reads: "By the endless surpassing blessing realized from dedication / To the practice of good, / May worldlings submerged in the torrent of passion / Go to the higher realm of Infinite Light."

The Bhutanese, i.e. Drukpa version runs as follows: “Through the true and boundless merit, attained by dedicating this ‘aspiration to good actions’ may all those now drowning in the ocean of suffering, reach the supreme realms of Amitabha.”

== See also ==
- Ghanavyūha sūtra
- Borobudur
