= Ci'en Temple (Liaoning) =

Buddhist temple in Liaoning, China

- 慈恩寺
- Location within Liaoning Location within China

Religion
- Affiliation: Buddhism
- Sect: Pure Land Buddhism

Location
- Location: Shenhe District, Shenyang, Liaoning
- Country: China
- Interactive map of Ci'en Temple
- Coordinates: 41°47′23″N 123°28′01″E

Architecture
- Style: Chinese architecture
- Established: 1628
- Completed: 1912 (reconstruction)

Website
- www.syciensi.com

Ci'en Temple (Chinese: 慈恩寺; pinyin: Cí'ēn Sì) is a Buddhist temple located in Shenhe District of Shenyang, Liaoning, China. Ci'en Temple is the site of the headquarters of the Shenyang Buddhist Association.

== History ==
Ci'en Temple was first built in 1628, during the reign of Chongzhen Emperor in the late Ming dynasty (1368–1644). In 1644, at the dawn of the Qing dynasty (1644–1911), the Main Hall, Hall of Skanda and corridors were added to the temple. But the temple became dilapidated for neglect.

In 1912, abbot Buzhen (步真) began to rebuild the temple. The reconstruction took 18 years, and lasted from 1912 to 1930.

The temple was designated as a municipal level key protection unit in 1985 and provincial level key cultural heritage in 1988. In 1983, the temple has been designated as a National Key Buddhist Temple in Han Chinese Area by the State Council of China.

== Architecture ==
Occupying an area of 2,995 square metres (32,240 sq ft), Ci'en Temple has 135 buildings and halls. The entire complex faces the west and has an exquisite layout in the order of the Shanmen, Four Heavenly Kings Hall, Mahavira Hall, Bhikkhu Hall and Buddhist Texts Library. The Bell Tower and Drum Tower are placed on both sides of the Four Heavenly Kings Hall.

=== Hall of Four Heavenly Kings ===
Maitreya and Skanda are enshrined in the Hall of Four Heavenly Kings and at the back of his statue is a statue of Skanda. Statues of Four Heavenly Kings stand on the left and right sides.

=== Mahavira Hall ===
The Mahavira Hall is the second hall and main hall in the temple. In the middle is the statue of Sakyamuni, statues of Amitabha and Bhaisajyaguru stand on the left and right sides of Sakyamuni's statue. The statues of Guanyin and Ksitigarbha are placed on the left front of Bhaisajyaguru. And statues of Manjushri and Samantabhadra are placed on the right front of Amitabha. At the back of Sakyamuni's statue are the statue of Nanhai Guanyin.

=== Hall of Sangharama Palace ===
The Hall of Sangharama Palace in the northern side the Mahavira Hall. Statue of Lord Guan is housed in the hall.
