= Desire realm =

Aspect of Buddhist cosmology

Translations of kāmadhātu
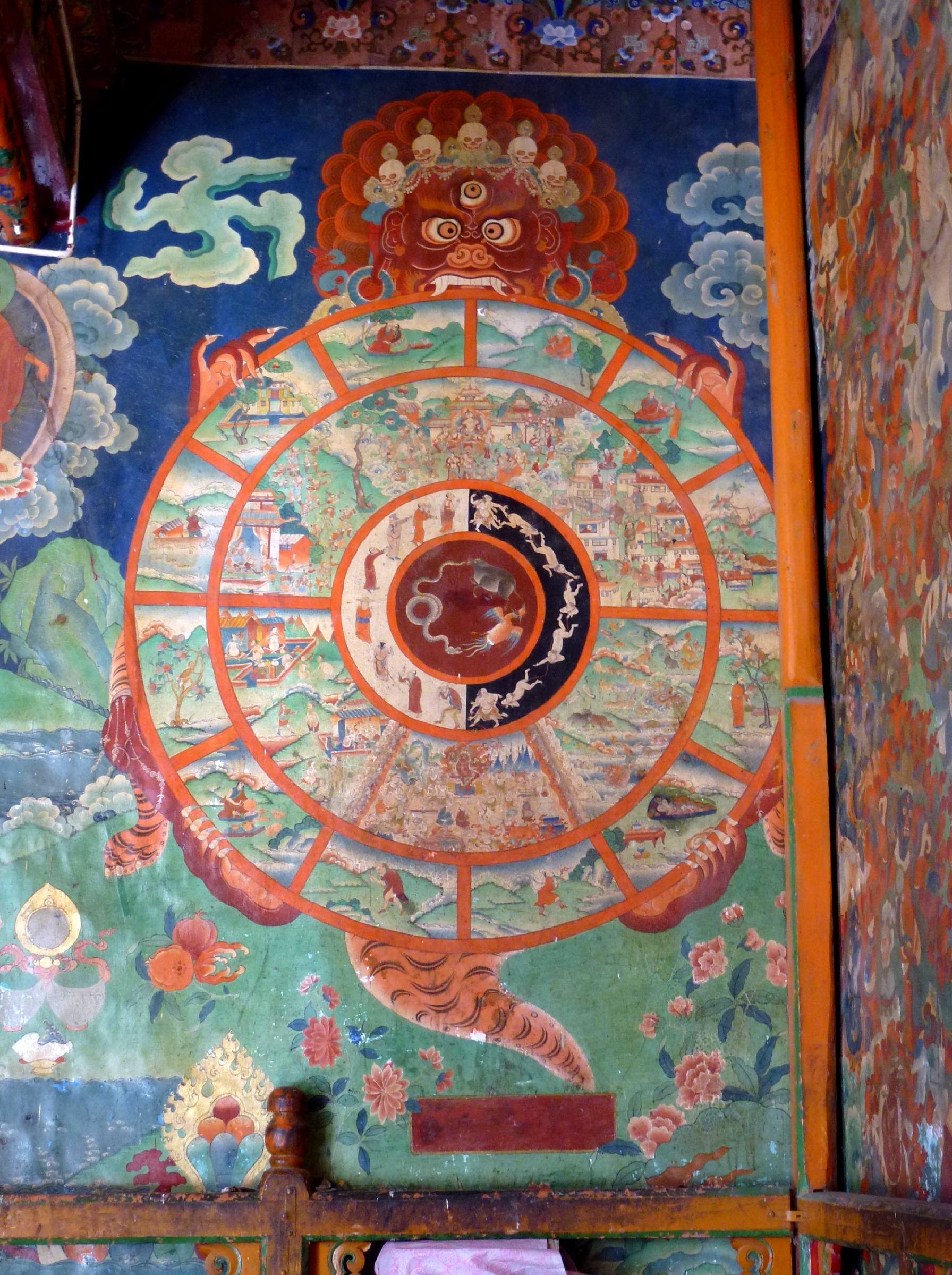
- Tibetan Bhavacakra or "Wheel of Life" in Sera, Lhasa
- English: desire realm
- Sanskrit: kāmadhātu (Dev: कामधातु)
- Chinese: 欲界 (Pinyin: yùjiè)
- Japanese: 欲界 (Rōmaji: Yokkai)
- Korean: 욕계

The desire realm (Sanskrit: कामधातु, kāmadhātu) is one of the trailokya or three realms (Sanskrit: धातु, dhātu, Tibetan: khams) in Buddhist cosmology into which a being caught in saṃsāra may be reborn. The other two are the Form Realm (Sanskrit: rūpadhātu) and the Formless Realm (ārūpadhātu).

Within the desire realm are either five or six domains (Sanskrit: gati, also sometimes translated as "realm"). In Tibetan Buddhism, there are six domains (Wylie: rigs drug gi skye gnas), and in Theravada Buddhism there are only five, because the domain of the Asuras is not regarded as separate from that of the Nāgas. The concept of these five realms is also to be found in Taoism and Jainism.

The Śūraṅgama Sūtra in Mahayana Buddhism regarded the 10 kinds of Xian as separate immortal realms between the deva and human realms.

The six domains of the desire realm are also known as the "six paths of suffering", the "six planes", and the "six lower realms". In schools of thought that use the ten realms system, these six domains are often contrasted negatively with the "four higher realms" of Śrāvaka, Pratyekabuddha, Bodhisattva and full Buddha, which are considered to be the spiritual goals of the different Buddhist traditions.

A being's karma (previous actions and thoughts) determines which of the six domains it will be reborn into. A sentient being may also ascend to one of the higher realms beyond the six domains of the desire realm by practicing various types of meditation, specifically the Eight Dhyānas.

The 8th century Buddhist monument Borobudur in Central Java incorporated the trailokya into the architectural design with the plan of mandala that took the form of a stepped stone pyramid crowned with stupas.

== The Six Domains ==
The six domains of the desire realm are as follows:

- the deity (Sanskrit, Pali: deva) domain
- the jealous god / titan (S., P.: asura) domain
- the human (S. manuṣya, P. manussa) domain
- the animal (S. tiryagyoni, P. tiracchānayoni) domain
- the hungry ghost (S. preta, P. petta) domain
- the hell (S: naraka, P. niraya) domain

=== Deva Domain ===
The Deva domain (also known as the heavenly domain or Blissful State) is the domain of bliss. The disadvantage of this domain is that things are so very comfortable there that these beings completely neglect to work towards enlightenment. Instead, they gradually use up the good karma they had previously accumulated and so they subsequently fall to a lower rebirth.

The Deva domain is sometimes also referred to as the gods' domain because of its inhabitants' power compared to humans. However, they are not immortal, only long-lived, and are still subject to karma and the saṃsāra.

=== Asura Domain ===
The Asura domain (also known as the Jealous God domain) is the domain of the Asuras (demigods). They are here because of actions in past lives based on egotistic jealousy, envy, insincerity, struggle, combat or rationalization of the world. They may be here because in human form they had good intentions but committed bad actions such as harming others. The Asuras of some other domains, however, are fully malevolent (such as the corruptor Mara) and can be more closely related to the translation of demon that is sometimes ascribed to them. These evil Asuras can be alternatively referred to as Rakshasas.

The Asuras are said to experience a much more pleasurable life than humans, but they are plagued by envy for the Devas, whom they can see just as animals can see humans.

=== Manussa Domain ===
The Manuṣya domain (also known as the Human domain) is based on passion, desire, doubt, and pride.

Buddhists see this domain as the realm of human existence. Although it may not be the most pleasurable domain to live in, a human rebirth is in fact considered to be by far the most advantageous of all possible rebirths in samsara, because a human rebirth is the only samsaric domain from which one can directly attain Bodhi (enlightenment), either in the present rebirth (for Buddhas and Arhats) or in a future rebirth in a Deva domain (for Anagamis). This is because of the unique possibilities that a human rebirth offers: beings in higher domains just choose to enjoy the pleasures of their realms and neglect working towards enlightenment, while beings in lower domains are too busy trying to avoid the suffering and pain of their worlds to give a second thought to liberation. Humans have just the right balance: enough suffering to motivate them to achieve liberation, but not too much that every moment of their lives is consumed by it.

A human rebirth is considered to have tremendous potential when used correctly, however in most cases humans waste their lifetimes in materialistic pursuits rather than working towards enlightenment, and so end up reinforcing their unhelpful emotions, thoughts, and actions, rather than letting go of them. Because of this, it is almost always the case that one descends to a lower domain of rebirth after a human life, rather than immediately going on to another human birth, or going up to a higher domain.

In the lower domains, such as the animal domain, it is a very slow and difficult process to accumulate enough merit to achieve a human rebirth once again, so it may be countless lifetimes before one has another chance.

=== Tiryagyoni Domain ===
The Tiryagyoni domain (alternately spelled Tiryag-yoni or tiracchānayoni) (also known as the Animal domain) is based on strong mental states of stupidity and prejudice cultivated in a previous life or lives.

Buddhists believe that this domain is the domain of existence of the nonhuman animals on the Earth. Although humans and animals live in separate domains of existence, they can still see each other because their domains are so close to each other in the vertical cosmology, just as the Devas and Asuras can see each other despite being in separate domains.

=== Preta Domain ===
The Preta domain (also known as the Hungry Ghost domain) is a rebirth based on strong possessiveness and desire which were cultivated in a previous life or lives.

The sentient beings in this domain are known as "hungry ghosts". They are constantly extremely hungry and thirsty, but they cannot satisfy these needs. In Tibetan versions of the Bhavacakra these beings are drawn with narrow necks and large bellies. This represents the fact that their desires torment them, but they are completely unable to satisfy themselves.

=== Naraka Domain ===
The Naraka domain (also known as the Niraya domain or the Hell domain) is a rebirth based on strong states of hatred cultivated in a previous life or lives. The sentient beings in Naraka stay there until their negative karma is spent, at which point they are reborn into another domain.

== The Wheel of life ==
The Bhavachakra or "Wheel of Life" is a popular teaching tool often used in the Indo-Tibetan tradition. It is a kind of diagram which portrays these realms and the mechanism that causes these samsaric rebirths. In this depiction, the realm of the Devas is shown at the top, followed clockwise by the realms of the Asuras, the Animals, Naraka, the Pretas, and the Humans. Close examination will show that the Buddha is shown as being present in every one of these realms.

== Characteristics ==
In Mahayana and Vajrayana Buddhism, there are some sayings reflecting a tradition that the manner of a sentient being's death indicates the world in which it will be reborn. A common one is that in the Verses on the Structure of the Eight Consciousnesses (八識規矩補註), which reads: "in those to be reborn as saints the last part to retain bodily heat is the top of the head, in those to be reborn devas it is the eyes, while in the case of the human realm it is the heart, that of the hungry ghosts, the belly, that of animals, the knee caps, and lastly, in that of the hell realm, the soles of the feet." The Tibetan Buddhist text Bardo Thodol describes further on the experiences proper to these realms.

== In yogic practice ==
Tenzin Wangyal Rinpoche and Chögyal Namkai Norbu Rinpoche have published literature teaching a "Practice of the Six Lokas" designed to "purify the karmic traces that lead to rebirth in the different realms," wherein the six lokas are also cognate with the principal six chakra system of Vajrayana.

== See also ==
- Jāti: Forms of birth
- Om mani padme hum
- Shurangama Mantra—Extensive tantric prayers for the suffering beings of the Six Realms
