= Buddhist cosmology =

Description of the universe in Buddhist texts

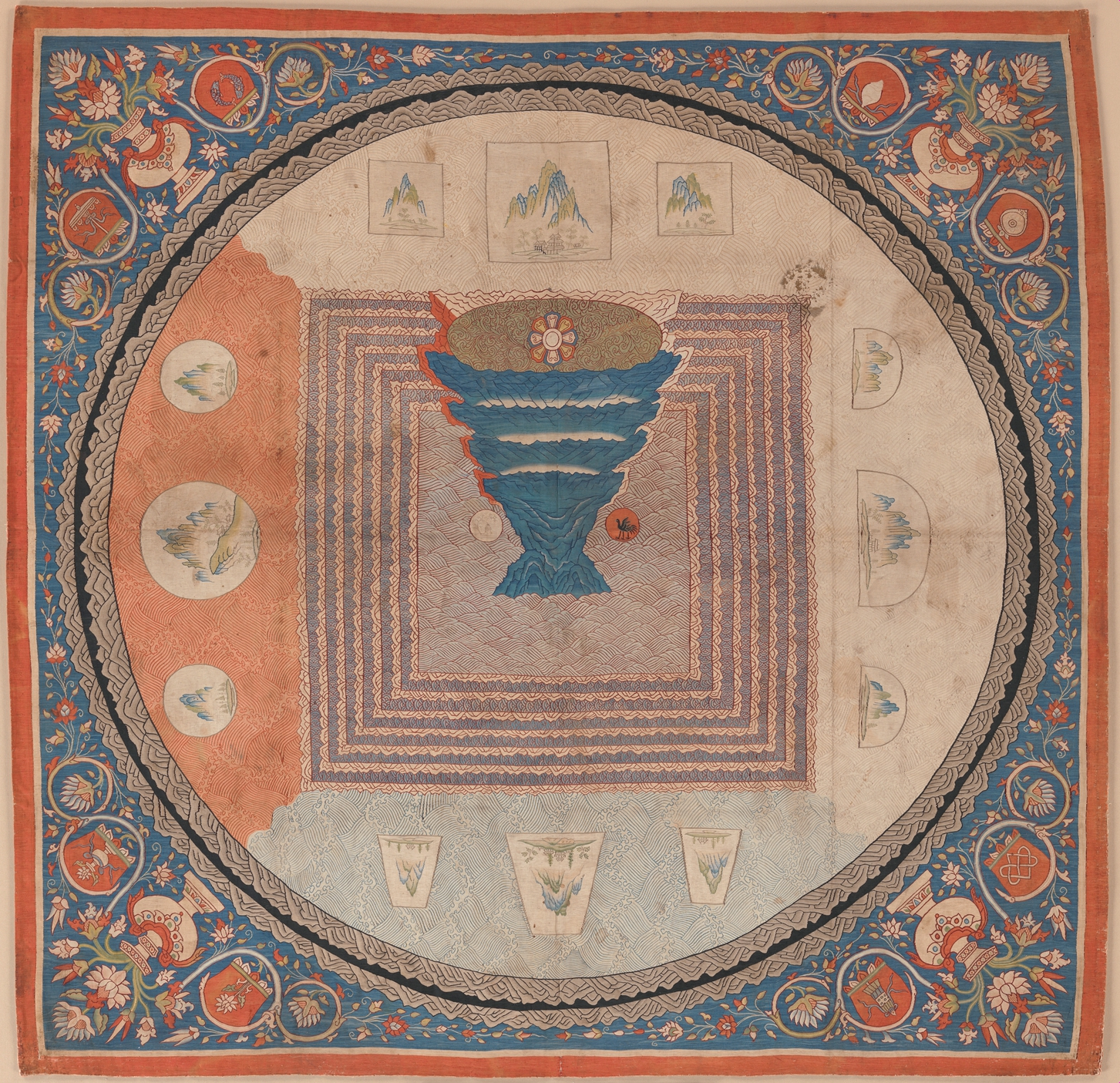
Buddhist mandala with Mount Meru shown in the center depicting the terrestrial universe divided into four quadrants each containing oceans and continents with the known world of humans, Jambudvīpa, located in the south alongside three other continents named Pūrvavideha, Aparagodānīya and Uttarakuru.

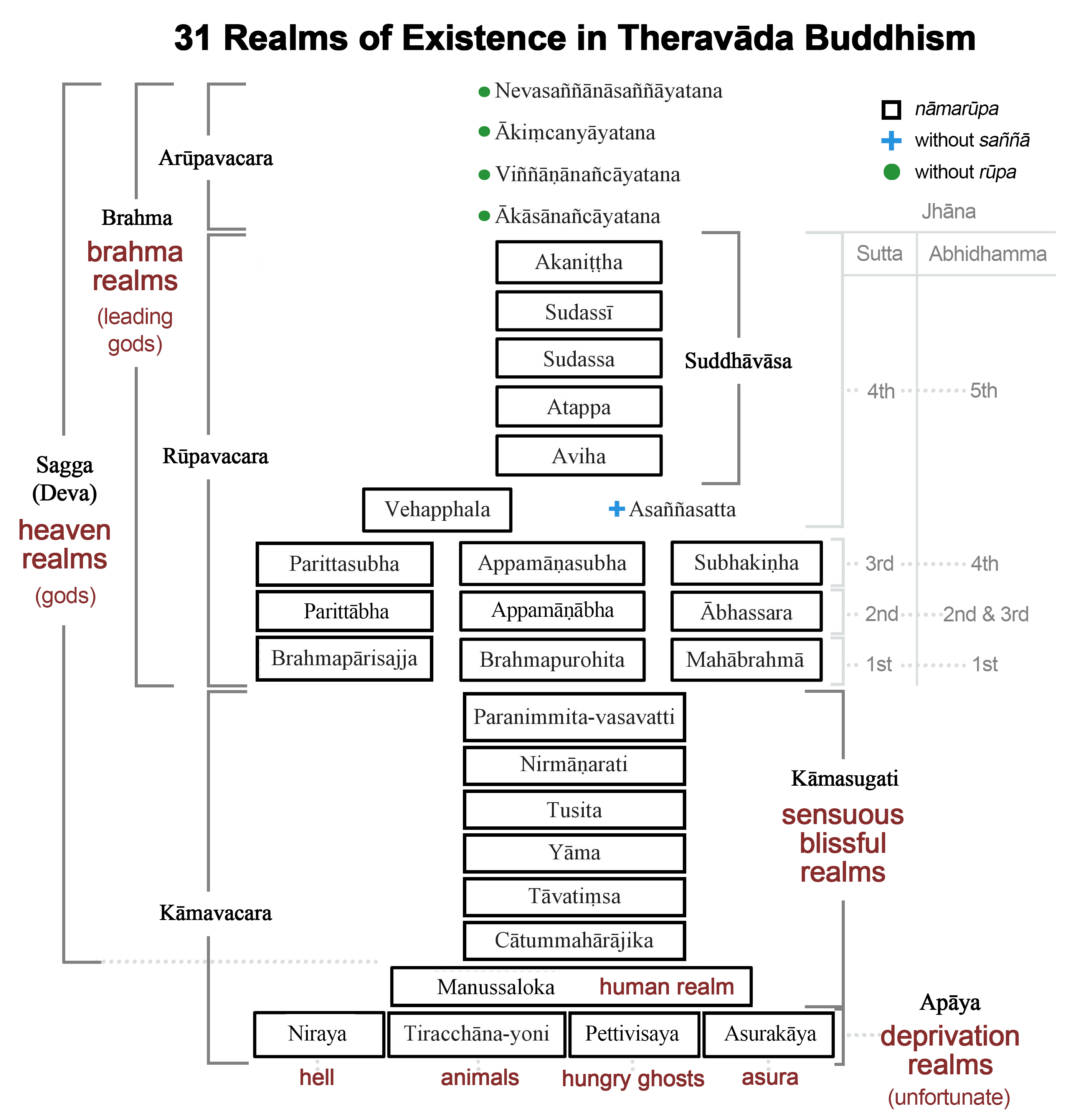
The thirty-one planes of existence and the Jhānic-relation according to Theravāda Buddhism

Buddhist cosmology is the description of the shape and evolution of the Universe according to Buddhist scriptures and commentaries.

It consists of a temporal and a spatial cosmology. The temporal cosmology describes the timespan of the creation and dissolvement of alternate universes in different aeons. The spatial cosmology consists of a vertical cosmology, the various planes of beings, into which beings are reborn due to their merits and development; and a horizontal cosmology, the distribution of these world-systems into an infinite sheet of existential dimensions included in the cycle of samsara. The entire universe is said to be made up of five basic elements of Earth, Water, Fire, Air and Space. Buddhist cosmology is also intwined with the belief of Karma. As a result, some ages are filled with prosperity and peace due to common goodness, whereas other eras are filled with suffering, dishonesty and short lifespans.

== Meaning and origin ==
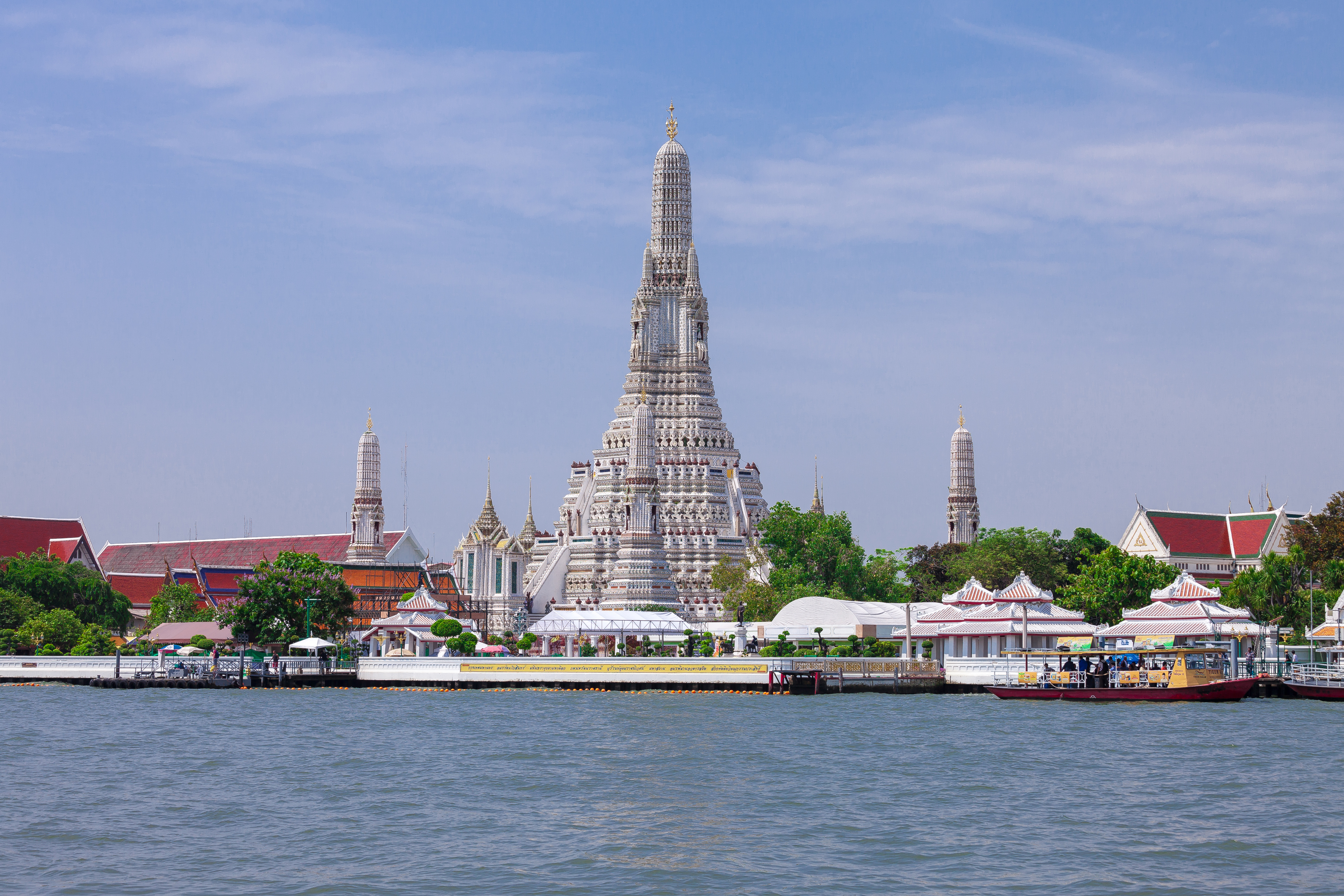
Wat Arun in Bangkok has five pagodas, which were built to simulate Buddhist cosmology.

=== Course of rebirth and liberation ===
The Buddhist cosmology is not a literal description of the shape of the universe; rather, it is the universe as seen through the divyacakṣus (Pali: dibbacakkhu दिब्बचक्खु), the "divine eye" by which a Buddha or an Arahant can perceive all beings arising (being born) and passing away (dying) within various worlds; and can tell from what state they have been reborn, and into which state they will be reborn.

Beings can be reborn as devas (gods and Brahmas), humans, animals, asuras (demons), pretas ("hungry ghosts"), and as inhabitants of the hell realms.

The process by which sentient beings migrate from one state of existence to another is dependent on causes and conditions. The three causes are giving or charity, moral conduct, meditative development, and their opposites. Rebirth in the Kama-loka (desire realm) depends on a person's moral conduct and practice of giving. Rebirth in the Rupa-loka (form realm) and Arupa-loka (formless realm) also requires meditation development. Liberation from all rebirth requires eons upon eons of perfecting charity, moral conduct, and meditative development, in order to achieve Buddhahood.

=== Origins ===
The Buddhist cosmology, as presented in commentaries and works of Abhidharma in both Theravāda and Mahāyāna traditions, is the end-product of an analysis and reconciliation of cosmological comments found in the Buddhist sūtra and vinaya traditions. No single sūtra sets out the entire structure of the universe, but in several sūtras the Buddha describes other worlds and states of being, and other sūtras describe the origin and destruction of the universe. The order of the planes are found in various discourses of Gautama Buddha in the Sutta Pitaka. In the Saleyyaka Sutta of the Majjhima Nikaya the Buddha mentioned the planes above the human plane in ascending order. In several suttas in the Anguttara Nikaya, the Buddha described the causes of rebirth in these planes in the same order.

The synthesis of this data into a single comprehensive system must have taken place early in the history of Buddhism, as the system described in the Pāli Vibhajyavāda tradition (represented by today's Theravādins) agrees, despite some minor inconsistencies of nomenclature, with the Sarvāstivāda tradition which is preserved by Mahāyāna Buddhists.

== Traditional Abhidharma cosmology ==
Traditional Buddhist schools in India all followed complex cosmological systems which were laid out in the Abhidharma texts of the various Buddhist schools.

=== Spatial cosmology ===
The plan of the Borobudur temple complex in Java mirrors the three main levels of Buddhist cosmology. The highest point in the center symbolizes Buddhahood.

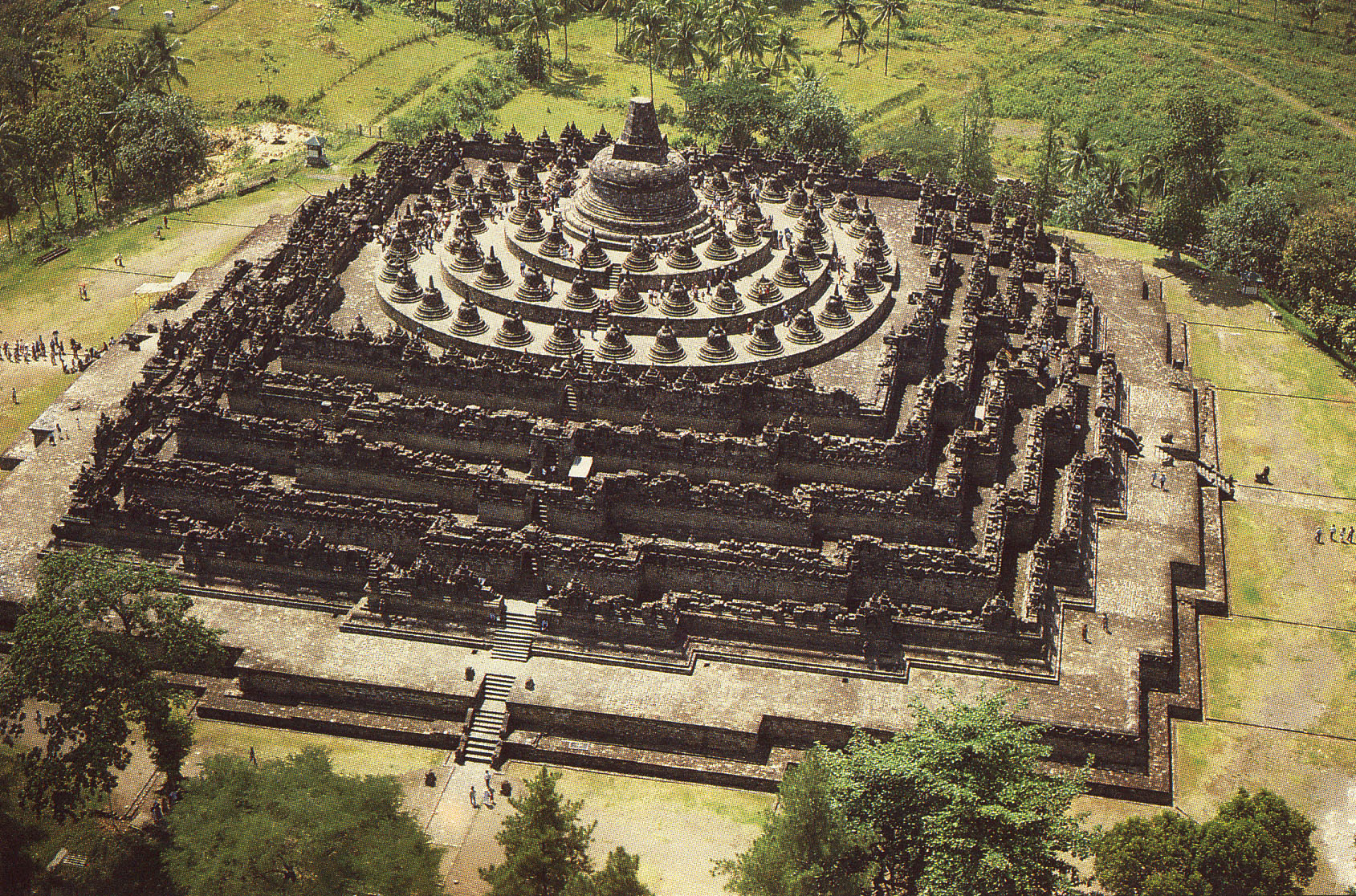
Aerial view of Borobudur

The spatial cosmology displays the various worlds in which beings can be reborn. Spatial cosmology can also be divided into two branches. The vertical (or cakravāḍa; Devanagari: चक्रवाड) cosmology describes the arrangement of worlds in a vertical pattern, some being higher and some lower. By contrast, the horizontal (sahasra) cosmology describes the grouping of these vertical worlds into sets of thousands, millions or billions.

=== Vertical cosmology – Three Realms ===
==== The three realms ====
The vertical cosmology is divided into three realms, or dhātus: the formless realm (Ārūpyadhātu), corresponding to the formless jhanas; the form realm (Rūpadhātu), corresponding to the rūpa jhānas; and the desire realm (Kamadhātu). The three realms contain together thirty-one planes of existence, each corresponding to a different type of mentality. These three realms (tridhātu, trailokya) are the Formless Realm (Ārūpyadhātu), which consists of four planes; the Form Realm (Rūpadhātu), which consists of sixteen planes; and the Pleasure Realm (Kāmadhātu), which consists of eleven planes.

A world is not so much a location as it is the beings which compose it; it is sustained by their karma, and if the beings in a world all die or disappear, the world disappears too. Likewise, a world comes into existence when the first being is born into it. The physical separation is not so important as the difference in mental state; humans and animals, though they partially share the same physical environments, still belong to different worlds because their minds perceive and react to those environments differently.

==== Devas and Brahma ====
In some instances, all of the beings born in the Ārūpyadhātu and the Rūpadhātu are informally classified as "Gods" or "Deities" (devāḥ), along with the Gods of the Kāmadhātu, notwithstanding the fact that the Deities of the Kāmadhātu differ more from those of the Ārūpyadhātu than they do from humans. It is to be understood that deva is an imprecise term referring to any being living in a longer-lived and generally more blissful state than humans. Most of them are not "gods" in the common sense of the term, having little or no concern with the human world and rarely if ever interacting with it; only the lowest deities of the Kāmadhātu correspond to the gods described in many polytheistic and monotheistic religions.

The term Brahmā is used both as a name and as a generic term for one of the higher devas. In its broadest sense, it can refer to any of the inhabitants of the Ārūpyadhātu and the Rūpadhātu. In more restricted senses, it can refer to an inhabitant of one of the eleven lower worlds of the Rūpadhātu, or in its narrowest sense, to the three lowest worlds of the Rūpadhātu (Plane of Brahma's retinue). A large number of devas use the name "Brahmā", e.g. Brahmā Sahampati (ब्रह्मा सहम्पत्ति), Brahmā Sanatkumāra (ब्रह्मा सनत्कुमारः), Baka Brahmā (बकब्रह्मा), etc. It is not always clear which world they belong to, although it must always be one of the worlds of the Rūpadhātu. According to the Ayacana Sutta, Brahmā Sahampati, who advises the Buddha to teach Dhamma to the world, resides in the Śuddhāvāsa worlds.

==== Formless Realm (Ārūpyadhātu) ====
The Formless Realm (Ārūpyadhātu (Sanskrit) or Arūpaloka (Pāli) (Note: Tib: gzugs med pa'i khams; Vietnamese: Giới Vô Sắc; Chinese: 无色界/無色界; Japanese: 無色界 Mushiki-kai; Burmese: အရူပလောက; Thai: อารูปยธาตุ/ อรูปโลก; Devanagari: आरूप्यधातु / अरूपलोक)) belongs to those Devas who attained and remained in the Four Formless Absorptions (catuḥ-samāpatti चतुःसमापत्ति) of the arūpadhyānas in a previous life, and now enjoy the fruits (vipāka) of the good karma of that accomplishment. Bodhisattvas, however, are never born in the Ārūpyadhātu even when they have attained the arūpadhyānas.

The Formless Realm would have no place in a purely physical cosmology, as none of the beings inhabiting it has either shape or location; and correspondingly, the realm has no location either. The inhabitants of these realms are possessed entirely of mind. Having no physical form or location, they are unable to hear Dhamma teachings.

There are four types of Formless Deva planes corresponding to the four types of arūpadhyānas:

- "Sphere of neither perception nor non-perception" (Naivasaṃjñānāsaṃjñāyatana नैवसंज्ञानासंज्ञायतन or Nevasaññānāsaññāyatana नेवसञ्ञानासञ्ञायतन (Note: Standard Tibetan: du shes med 'du shes med min; Vietnamese: Xứ Phi Tưởng Phi Phi Tưởng; Chinese: 非有想非无想処; Japanese: 非有想非無想処; Burmese: နေဝသညာ နာသညာယတန; Thai: เนวสญฺญานาสญฺญายตน or ไนวสํชญานาสํชญายตน)). Rebirth on this plane is a result of attaining the fourth formless jhana in a previous life. In this sphere the Formless Devas have gone beyond a mere negation of perception and have attained a liminal state where they do not engage in "perception" (saṃjñā, recognition of particulars by their marks) but are not wholly unconscious. This was the sphere reached by Udraka Rāmaputra (Pāli: Uddaka Rāmaputta), the second of the Buddha's original teachers, who considered it equivalent to enlightenment. Total life span in this realm in human years - 84,000 Maha Kalpa. This realm is placed 5,580,000 yojanas above the Plane of Nothingness (Ākiṃcanyāyatana).
- "Sphere of Nothingness" (literally "lacking anything") (Ākiṃcanyāyatana आकिंचन्यायतना or Ākiñcaññāyatana आकिञ्चञ्ञायतन (Note: Standard Tibetan: ci yang med; Vietnamese: Xứ Vô Sở Hữu; Chinese: 无所有处/無所有處; Japanese: 無所有処, romanized: mu sho u sho; Burmese: အာကိဉ္စညာယတန; Thai: อากิญฺจญฺญายตน or อากิํจนฺยายตน)). Rebirth on this plane is a result of attaining the third formless jhana in a previous life. In this sphere Formless Devas dwell contemplating upon the thought that "there is no thing". This is considered a form of perception, though a very subtle one. This was the sphere reached by Ārāḍa Kālāma (Pali: Āḷāra Kālāma), the first of the Buddha's original teachers; he considered it to be equivalent to enlightenment. Total life span in this realm in human years – 60,000 Maha Kalpa. This realm is placed 5,580,000 yojanas above the Plane of Infinite Consciousness (Vijñānānantyāyatana).
- "Sphere of Infinite Consciousness" (Vijñānānantyāyatana विज्ञानानन्त्यायतन or Viññāṇānañcāyatana विञ्ञाणानञ्चायतन or more commonly the contracted form Viññāṇañcāyatana (Note: Standard Tibetan: rnam shes mtha' yas; Vietnamese: Xứ Thức Vô Biên; Chinese: 识无边处/識無邊處; Japanese: 識無辺処, romanized: shiki mu hen jo; Burmese: ဝိညာဏဉ္စာယတန; Thai: วิญญาณานญฺจายตน or วิชญานานนฺตยายตน)). Rebirth on this plane is a result of attaining the second formless jhana. In this sphere Formless Devas dwell meditating on their consciousness (vijñāna) as infinitely pervasive. Total life span in this realm in human years – 40,000 Maha Kalpa. This realm is placed 5,580,000 yojanas above the Plane of Infinite Space (Ākāśānantyāyatana).
- "Sphere of Infinite Space" (Ākāśānantyāyatana आकाशानन्त्यायतन or Ākāsānañcāyatana आकासानञ्चायतन (Note: (Standard Tibetan: nam mkha' mtha' yas; Vietnamese: Xứ Không Vô Biên; Chinese: 空无边处/空無邊處; Japanese: 空無辺処, romanized: kū mu hen jo; Burmese: အာကာသာနဉ္စာယတန; Thai: อากาสานญฺจายตน or อากาศานนฺตยายตน)). Rebirth on this plane is a result of attaining the first formless jhana. In this sphere Formless Devas dwell meditating upon space or extension (ākāśa) as infinitely pervasive. Total life span in this realm in human years – 20,000 Maha Kalpa. This realm is placed 5,580,000 yojanas above the Akanittha Brahma Loka – Highest plane of pure abodes.

==== Form Realm (Rūpadhātu) ====
The Rūpadhātu (Sanskrit: रूपधातु; Pali: रूपलोक, romanized: rūpaloka; Tibetan: གཟུགས་ཀྱི་ཁམས་, Wylie: gzugs kyi khams; Vietnamese: Sắc Giới; Chinese: 色界; Japanese: 色界, romanized: shiki-kai; Korean: 색계, romanized: saekgye; Burmese: ရူပဗြဟ္မာဘုံ; Thai: รูปโลก / รูปธาตุ) or "Form realm" is, as the name implies, the first of the physical realms; its inhabitants all have a location and bodies of a sort, though those bodies are composed of a subtle substance which is of itself invisible to the inhabitants of the Kāmadhātu. According to the Janavasabha Sutta, when a brahma (a being from the Brahma-world of the Rūpadhātu) wishes to visit a deva of the Trāyastriṃśa heaven (in the Kāmadhātu), he has to assume a "grosser form" in order to be visible to them. There are 16–22 Rūpadhātu in Buddhist texts, the most commonly given number being 18.

The beings of the Form realm are not subject to the extremes of pleasure and pain, or governed by desires for things pleasing to the senses, as the beings of the Kāmadhātu are. The bodies of Form realm beings do not have sexual distinctions.

Like the beings of the Ārūpyadhātu, the dwellers in the Rūpadhātu have minds corresponding to the dhyānas (Pāli: jhānas). In their case, it is the four lower dhyānas or rūpadhyānas (रुपध्यान). However, although the beings of the Rūpadhātu can be divided into four broad grades corresponding to these four dhyānas, each of them is subdivided into further grades, three for each of the four dhyānas and five for the Śuddhāvāsa devas, for a total of seventeen grades (the Theravāda tradition counts one less grade in the highest dhyāna for a total of sixteen).

Physically, the Rūpadhātu consists of a series of planes stacked on top of each other, each one in a series of steps half the size of the previous one as one descends. In part, this reflects the fact that the devas are also thought of as physically larger on the higher planes. The highest planes are also broader in extent than the ones lower down, as discussed in the section on Sahasra cosmology. The height of these planes is expressed in yojanas, a measurement of very uncertain length, but sometimes taken to be about 4,000 times the height of a man, and so approximately 4.54 miles (7.31 km).

==== Pure Abodes (non-returners) ====
The Śuddhāvāsa (Sanskrit: शुद्धावास; Pali: सुद्धावास, romanized: suddhāvāsa; Tibetan: གནས་གཙང་མ་, Wylie: gnas gtsang ma; Vietnamese: Tịnh Cư Thiên; Chinese: 净居天/淨居天; Japanese: 五部浄居天, romanized: gobujōgoten; Korean: 정거천, romanized: jeonggeocheon; Thai: สุทฺธาวาส) worlds, or "Pure Abodes", are distinct from the other worlds of the Rūpadhātu in that they do not house beings who have been born there through ordinary merit or meditative attainments, but only those Anāgāmins ("Non-returners"), the third level on the path of enlightenment, who are already on the path to Arhat-hood and who will attain enlightenment directly from the Śuddhāvāsa worlds without being reborn in a lower plane. These Pure Abodes are accessible only to those who have destroyed the lower five fetters, consisting of self-view, sceptical doubt, clinging to rites and ceremonies, sense desires, and ill-will. They will destroy their remaining fetters of craving for fine material existence, craving for immaterial existence, conceit, restlessness and ignorance during their existence in the Pure Abodes. Those who take rebirth here are called "non-returners" because they do not return from that world, but attain final nibbana there without coming back. Every Śuddhāvāsa deva is therefore a protector of Buddhism. They guard and protect Buddhism on earth, and will pass into enlightenment as Arhats when they pass away from the Suddhavasa worlds. Brahma Sahampati, an inhabitant from these worlds, who appealed to the newly enlightened Buddha to teach, was an Anagami under the previous Buddha. Because a Śuddhāvāsa deva will never be reborn outside the Śuddhāvāsa worlds, no Bodhisattva is ever born in these worlds, as a Bodhisattva must ultimately be reborn as a human being.

Since these devas rise from lower planes only due to the teaching of a Buddha, they can remain empty for very long periods if no Buddha arises. However, unlike the lower worlds, the Śuddhāvāsa worlds are never destroyed by natural catastrophe. The Śuddhāvāsa devas predict the coming of a Buddha and, taking the guise of Brahmins, reveal to human beings the signs by which a Buddha can be recognized. They also ensure that a Bodhisattva in his last life will see the four signs that will lead to his renunciation.

The five Śuddhāvāsa worlds are:

- Akaniṣṭha (Sanskrit: अकनिष्ठ; Pali: अकनिठ्ठ, romanized: akaniṭṭha; Vietnamese: Trời Sắc Cứu Cánh; Chinese: 色究竟天; Thai: อกนิฏฺฐา, อกนิษฐา) – World of devas "equal in rank" (literally: having no one as the youngest). The highest of all the Rūpadhātu worlds, it is often used to refer to the highest extreme of the universe. The current Śakra will eventually be born there. The duration of life in Akaniṣṭha is 16,000 kalpas (Vibhajyavāda tradition). The ruler of this realm is Maheśvara. The height of this world is 167,772,160 yojanas above the Earth.
- Sudarśana (Sanskrit: सुदर्शन; Pali: सुदस्सी, romanized: sudassī; Vietnamese: Trời Thiện Kiến; Chinese: 善见天; Thai: สุทัสสี, สุทารฺศฺน) – The "clear-seeing" devas live in a world similar to and friendly with the Akaniṣṭha world. The height of this world is 83,886,080 yojanas above the Earth.
- Sudṛśa (Sanskrit: सुदृश; Pali: सुदस्स, romanized: sudassa; Vietnamese: Trời Thiện Hiện; Chinese: 善现天; Thai: สุทัสสา, สุทรรศา) – The world of the "beautiful" devas are said to be the place of rebirth for five kinds of anāgāmins. The height of this world is 41,943,040 yojanas above the Earth.
- Atapa (Sanskrit: अतप; Pali: अतप्प, romanized: atappa; Vietnamese: Trời Vô Nhiệt; Chinese: 无热天; Thai: อตป, อตปฺปา) – The world of the "untroubled" devas, whose company those of lower realms wish for. The height of this world is 20,971,520 yojanas above the Earth.
- Avṛha (Sanskrit: अवृह; Pali: अविह, romanized: aviha; Vietnamese: Trời Vô Phiền; Chinese: 无烦天; Thai: อวิหา, อวรรหา) – The world of the "not falling" devas, perhaps the most common destination for reborn Anāgāmins. Many achieve arhatship directly in this world, but some pass away and are reborn in sequentially higher worlds of the Pure Abodes until they are at last reborn in the Akaniṣṭha world. These are called in Pāli uddhaṃsotas, "those whose stream goes upward". The duration of life in Avṛha is 1,000 kalpas (Vibhajyavāda tradition). The height of this world is 10,485,760 yojanas above the Earth.

==== Bṛhatphala worlds (fourth dhyana) ====
The mental state of the devas of the Bṛhatphala worlds Pali: vehapphala; Vietnamese: Tứ Thiền; Chinese: 四禅九天/四禪九天; Japanese: 四禅九天; Korean: 사선구천; Thai: เวหปฺปผลา) corresponds to the fourth dhyāna, and is characterized by equanimity (upekṣā). The Bṛhatphala worlds form the upper limit to the destruction of the universe by wind at the end of a mahākalpa (see Temporal cosmology below), that is, they are spared such destruction.

- Asaññasatta Sanskrit: असञ्ञसत्त, romanized: Asaṃjñasattva; Vietnamese: Trời Vô Tưởng;Chinese: 无想天; Thai: อสัญฺญสัตฺตา or อสํชญสตฺวา (Vibhajyavāda tradition only) – "Unconscious beings", who have only bodies without consciousness are the devas who have attained a high dhyāna (similar to that of the Formless Realm), and, wishing to avoid the perils of perception, have achieved a state of non-perception in which they endure for a time. Rebirth into this plane results from a meditative practice aimed at the suppression of consciousness. Those who take up this practice assume release from suffering can be achieved by attaining unconsciousness. However, when the life span in this realm ends, perception arises again, the beings pass away and are born in other planes where consciousness returns.
- Bṛhatphala बृहत्फल or Vehapphala वेहप्फल (Vietnamese: Trời Quảng Quả; Chinese: 广果天; Tibetan: འབྲས་བུ་ཆེ་, Wylie: 'bras bu che; Thai: เวหัปปผลา or พรฺหตฺผลา – Devas "having great fruit". Their lifespan is 500 mahākalpas. (Vibhajyavāda tradition). Some Anāgāmins are reborn here. The height of this world is 5,242,880 yojanas above the Earth. In the Jhana Sutta of the Anguttara Nikaya the Buddha said "The Vehapphala devas, monks, have a life-span of 500 eons. A run-of-the-mill person having stayed there, having used up all the life-span of those devas, goes to hell, to the animal womb, to the state of the hungry shades."
- Puṇyaprasava पुण्यप्रसव (Sarvāstivāda tradition only; Vietnamese: Trời Phước Sanh; Chinese: 福生天; Tibetan: བསོད་ནམས་སྐྱེས་, Wylie: bsod nams skyes; Thai: ปณฺยปรัสวา – The world of the devas who are the "offspring of merit". The height of this world is 2,621,440 yojanas above the Earth.
- Anabhraka अनभ्रक (Sarvāstivāda tradition only; Vietnamese: Trời Vô Vân; Chinese: 无云天; Tibetan: སྤྲིན་མེད་, Wylie: sprin med; Thai: อนภร๎กา – The world of the "cloudless" devas. The height of this world is 1,310,720 yojanas above the Earth.

==== Śubhakṛtsna worlds (third dhyana) ====
The mental state of the devas of the Śubhakṛtsna worlds (Vietnamese: Tam Thiền; Chinese: 三禅三天; Devanagari: शुभकृत्स्न; Thai: ศุภกฤตฺสนาภูมิ) corresponds to the third dhyāna, and is characterized by a quiet joy (sukha). These devas have bodies that radiate a steady light. The Śubhakṛtsna worlds form the upper limit to the destruction of the universe by water at the end of a mahākalpa (see Temporal cosmology below), that is, the flood of water does not rise high enough to reach them.

- Śubhakṛtsna शुभकृत्स्न or Subhakiṇṇa / Subhakiṇha सुभकिण्ण/सुभकिण्ह (Vietnamese: Trời Biến Tịnh; Chinese: 遍净天; Tibetan: དགེ་རྒྱས་, Wylie: dge rgyas; Thai: สุภกิณหา or ศุภกฤตฺสนา) – The world of devas of "total beauty". Their lifespan is 64 mahākalpas (some sources: 4 mahākalpas) according to the Vibhajyavāda tradition. 64 mahākalpas is the interval between destructions of the universe by wind, including the Śubhakṛtsna worlds. The height of this world is 655,360 yojanas above the Earth. The Buddha said, " A run-of-the-mill person having stayed there, having used up all the life-span of those devas, goes to hell, to the animal womb, to the state of the hungry shades."
- Apramāṇaśubha अप्रमाणशुभ or Appamāṇasubha अप्पमाणसुभ (Vietnamese: Trời Vô Lượng Tịnh; Chinese: 无量净天; Tibetan: ཚད་མེད་དགེ་, Wylie: tshad med dge; Thai: อัปปมาณสุภา or อัปรมาณศุภา) – The world of devas of "limitless beauty". Their lifespan is 32 mahākalpas (Vibhajyavāda tradition). They possess "faith, virtue, learning, munificence and wisdom". The height of this world is 327,680 yojanas above the Earth.
- Parīttaśubha परीत्तशुभ or Parittasubha परित्तसुभ (Vietnamese: Trời Thiểu Tịnh; Chinese: 少净天; Tibetan: དགེ་ཆུང་, Wylie: dge chung; Thai: ปริตฺตสุภา or ปรีตฺตศุภา) – The world of devas of "limited beauty". Their lifespan is 16 mahākalpas. The height of this world is 163,840 yojanas above the Earth.

==== Ābhāsvara worlds (second dhyana) ====
The mental state of the devas of the Ābhāsvara आभास्वर worlds (Vietnamese: Nhị Thiền; Chinese: 二禅三天; Thai: อาภัสสราภูมิ/อาภาสวราธาตุ corresponds to the second dhyāna, and is characterized by delight (prīti) as well as joy (sukha); the Ābhāsvara devas are said to shout aloud in their joy, crying aho sukham! ("Oh joy!"). These devas have bodies that emit flashing rays of light like lightning. They are said to have similar bodies (to each other) but diverse perceptions.

The Ābhāsvara worlds form the upper limit to the destruction of the universe by fire at the end of a mahākalpa (see Temporal cosmology below), that is, the column of fire does not rise high enough to reach them. After the destruction of the world, at the beginning of the vivartakalpa, the worlds are first populated by beings reborn from the Ābhāsvara worlds.

- Ābhāsvara आभास्वर or Ābhassara आभस्सर (Vietnamese: Trời Quang Âm; Chinese: 光音天; Tibetan: འོད་གསལ་, Wylie: 'od gsal; Thai: อาภัสสรา or อาภาสวรา) – The world of devas "possessing splendor". The lifespan of the Ābhāsvara devas is 8 mahākalpas (others: 2 mahākalpas). Eight mahākalpas is the interval between destructions of the universe by water, which includes the Ābhāsvara worlds. The height of this world is 81,920 yojanas above the Earth.
- Apramāṇābha अप्रमाणाभ or Appamāṇābha अप्पमाणाभ (Vietnamese: Trời Vô Lượng Quang; Chinese: 无量光天; Tibetan: ཚད་མེད་འོད་, Wylie: tshad med 'od; Thai: อัปปมาณาภา or อัปรมาณาภา) – The world of devas of "limitless light", a concept on which they meditate. Their lifespan is 4 mahākalpas. The height of this world is 40,960 yojanas above the Earth.
- Parīttābha परीत्ताभ or Parittābha परित्ताभ (Vietnamese: Trời Thiểu Quang; Chinese: 少光天; Tibetan: འོད་ཆུང་, Wylie: 'od chung; Thai: ปริตฺตาภา or ปรีตตาภา) – The world of devas of "limited light". Their lifespan is 2 mahākalpas. The height of this world is 20,480 yojanas above the Earth.

==== Brahmā worlds (first dhyana) ====
The mental state of the devas of the Brahmā worlds (Vietnamese: Sơ Thiền; Chinese: 初禅三天; Thai: พรหมภูมิ) corresponds to the first dhyāna, and is characterized by observation (vitarka) and reflection (vicāra) as well as delight (prīti) and joy (sukha). The Brahmā worlds, together with the other lower worlds of the universe, are destroyed by fire at the end of a mahākalpa (see Temporal cosmology below). One way to rebirth in the Brahma world is mastery over the first jhana. Another is through meditations on loving kindness, compassion, altruistic joy, and equanimity. The Buddha teaches the Brahmin Subha, how to be born in the world of Brahma, in the Subha Sutta, when asked by him.

- Mahābrahmā महाब्रह्मा (Tibetan: ཚངས་པ་ཆེན་པོ་, Wylie: tshangs pa chen po; Vietnamese: Trời Đại Phạm; Chinese: 大梵天; Japanese: 'Daibonten; Korean: 대범천; Thai: มหาพรหฺมฺา) – Brahmaloka is the world of "Great Brahmā", believed by many to be the creator of the world, and having as his name Mahābrahmā, the Conqueror, the Unconquered, the All-Seeing, All-Powerful, the Lord, the Maker and Creator, the Ruler, Appointer and Orderer, Father of All That Have Been and Shall Be." According to the Brahmajāla Sutta (DN.1), a Mahābrahmā is a being from the Ābhāsvara worlds who falls into a lower world through exhaustion of his merits and is reborn alone in the Brahma-world; forgetting his former existence, he imagines himself to have come into existence without cause. Note that even such a high-ranking deity has no intrinsic knowledge of the worlds above his own. Mahābrahmā is 1 1/2 yojanas tall. His lifespan variously said to be 1 kalpa (Vibhajyavāda tradition) or 1 1/2 kalpas long (Sarvāstivāda tradition), although it would seem that it could be no longer than 3/4 of a mahākalpa, i.e., all of the mahākalpa except for the Saṃvartasthāyikalpa, because that is the total length of time between the rebuilding of the lower world and its destruction. It is unclear what period of time "kalpa" refers to in this case. The height of this world is 10,240 yojanas above the Earth.
- Brahmapurohita ब्रह्मपुरोहित (Vietnamese: Trời Phạm Phụ; Chinese: 梵辅天; Tibetan: ཚངས་འཁོར་, Wylie: tshangs 'khor; Thai: พรหฺมปุโรหิตา) – the "Ministers of Brahmā" are beings, also originally from the Ābhāsvara worlds, that are born as companions to Mahābrahmā after he has spent some time alone. Since they arise subsequent to his thought of a desire for companions, he believes himself to be their creator, and they likewise believe him to be their creator and lord. They are 1 yojana in height and their lifespan is variously said to be 1/2 of a kalpa (Vibhajyavāda tradition) or a whole kalpa (Sarvāstivāda tradition). If they are later reborn in a lower world, and come to recall some part of their last existence, they teach the doctrine of Brahmā as creator as a revealed truth. The height of this world is 5,120 yojanas above the Earth.
- Brahmapāriṣadya ब्रह्मपारिषद्य or Brahmapārisajja ब्रह्मपारिसज्ज (Vietnamese: Trời Phạm Chúng; Chinese: 梵众天; Tibetan: ཚངས་རིས་, Wylie: tshangs ris; Thai: พรหฺมปริสัชชา or พรหฺมปาริษัตยา) – the "Councilors of Brahmā" or the devas "belonging to the assembly of Brahmā". They are also called Brahmakāyika, but this name can be used for any of the inhabitants of the Brahma-worlds. They are half a yojana in height and their lifespan is variously said to be 1/3 of a kalpa (Vibhajyavāda tradition) or 1/2 of a kalpa (Sarvāstivāda tradition). The height of this world is 2,560 yojanas above the Earth.

==== Desire Realm (Kāmadhātu) ====
The beings born in the Kāmadhātu कामधातु (Pali: कामलोक, romanized: Kāmaloka; Tibetan: འདོད་པའི་ཁམས་, Wylie: 'dod pa'i khams; Vietnamese: Giới Dục; Chinese: 欲界; Japanese: Yoku-kai; Korean: 욕계; Thai: กามภูมิ) differ in degree of happiness, but they are all, other than Anagamis, Arhats and Buddhas, under the domination of Māra and are bound by sensual desire, which causes them suffering. Birth into these planes takes place as a result of our Karma. The Sense-Sphere (Desire) Realm is the lowest of the three realms. The driving force within this realm is sensual desire.

==== Heavens ====
The following four worlds are bounded planes, each 80,000 yojanas square, which float in the air above the top of Mount Sumeru. Although all of the worlds inhabited by devas (that is, all the worlds down to the Cāturmahārājakāyika world and sometimes including the Asuras) are sometimes called "heavens". These devas enjoy aesthetic pleasures, long life, beauty, and certain powers. Anyone who has led a wholesome life can be born in them.

===== Higher Heavens (Higher Kama Loka) =====
These devas live in four heavens that float in the air, leaving them free from contact with the strife of the lower world. In the Western sense of the word "heaven", the term best applies to the four worlds listed below:

- Parinirmita-vaśavartin परिनिर्मितवशवर्ती or Paranimmita-vasavatti परनिम्मितवसवत्ति (Tibetan: གཞན་འཕྲུལ་དབང་བྱེད་, Wylie: gzhan 'phrul dbang byed; Vietnamese: Trời Tha Hoá Tự Tại; Chinese: 他化自在天; Japanese: Takejizai-ten; Korean: 타화자재천; Burmese: ပရနိမ္မိတဝသဝတ္တီ; Thai: ปรนิมมิตวสวัตฺติ or ปริเนรมิตวศวรติน) – The heaven of devas "with power over (others') creations". These devas do not create pleasing forms that they desire for themselves, but their desires are fulfilled by the acts of other devas who wish for their favor. The ruler of this world is called Vaśavartin (Pāli: Vasavatti), who has a longer life, greater beauty, more power and happiness and more delightful sense-objects than the other devas of his world. This world is also the home of the devaputra (being of divine race) called Māra, who endeavors to keep all beings of the Kāmadhātu in the grip of sensual pleasures. Māra is also sometimes called Vaśavartin, but in general these two dwellers of this world are kept distinct. The beings of this world are 4,500 feet (1,400 m) tall and live for 9,216,000,000 years (Sarvāstivāda tradition). The height of this world is 1,280 yojanas above the Earth.
- Nirmāṇarati निर्माणरति or Nimmānaratī निम्माणरती (Tibetan: འཕྲུལ་དགའ་, Wylie: 'phrul dga'; Vietnamese: Trời Hoá Lạc; Chinese: 化乐天/化樂天; Japanese: 化楽天 Keraku-ten; Korean: 화락천; Burmese: နိမ္မာနရတိ; Thai: นิมมานรติ or นิรมาณรติ)– The world of devas "delighting in their creations". The devas of this world are capable of making any appearance to please themselves. The lord of this world is called Sunirmita (Pāli: Sunimmita); his wife is the rebirth of Visākhā, formerly the chief of the upāsikās (female lay devotees) of the Buddha. The beings of this world are 3,750 feet (1,140 m) tall and live for 2,304,000,000 years (Sarvāstivāda tradition). The height of this world is 640 yojanas above the Earth.
- Tuṣita तुषित or Tusita तुसित (Tibetan: དགའ་ལྡན་, Wylie: dga' ldan; Vietnamese: Trời Đâu Suất; Chinese: 兜率天; Japanese: Tosotsu-ten; Korean: 도솔천; Burmese: တုသိတာ; Thai: ดุสิต, ตุสิตา or ตุษิตา) – The world of the "joyful" devas. This world is best known for being the world in which a Bodhisattva lives before being reborn in the world of humans. Until a few thousand years ago, the Bodhisattva of this world was Śvetaketu (Pāli: Setaketu), who was reborn as Siddhārtha, who would become the Buddha Śākyamuni; since then the Bodhisattva has been Nātha (or Nāthadeva) who will be reborn as Ajita and will become the Buddha Maitreya (Pāli Metteyya). While this Bodhisattva is the foremost of the dwellers in Tuṣita, the ruler of this world is another deva called Santuṣita (Pāli: Santusita). The beings of this world are 3,000 feet (910 m) tall and live for 576,000,000 years (Sarvāstivāda tradition). The height of this world is 320 yojanas above the Earth.
- Yāma याम (Tibetan: འཐབ་བྲལ་, Wylie: 'thab bral; Vietnamese: Trời Dạ Ma; Chinese: 夜摩天; Japanese: Yama-ten; Korean: 야마천; Burmese: ယာမာ; Thai: ยามา) – Sometimes called the "heaven without fighting", because it is the lowest of the heavens to be physically separated from the tumults of the earthly world. These devas live in the air, free of all difficulties. Its ruler is the deva Suyāma; according to some, his wife is the rebirth of Sirimā, a courtesan of Rājagṛha in the Buddha's time who was generous to the monks. The beings of this world are 2,250 feet (690 m) tall and live for 144,000,000 years (Sarvāstivāda tradition). The height of this world is 160 yojanas above the Earth.

===== Lower Heavens (Worlds of Sumeru) =====
The world-mountain of Sumeru सुमेरु (Vietnamese: Tu Di; Sineru सिनेरु; Thai: เขาพระสุเมรุ, สิเนรุบรรพต) is described in Buddhist cosmology as a mountain located at the center of the world, around which the Sun and Moon revolve. Its base rests in a vast ocean, and it is surrounded by concentric rings of mountains and oceans. The three worlds listed below are all located on or around Sumeru are inhabited by different classes of beings: the Trāyastriṃśa devas reside on its peak, the Cāturmahārājakāyika devas reside on its slopes, and the Asuras are described as inhabiting the ocean at its base. Sumeru and its surrounding mountains and oceans are also inhabited by various found in Buddhist cosmological and mythological traditions. These beings are described as engaging in activities including pleasure, conflict, and warfare, and are generally distinguished compared to the human realm and the higher classes of devas.

- Trāyastriṃśa त्रायस्त्रिंश or Tāvatiṃsa तावतिंस (Tibetan: སུམ་ཅུ་རྩ་གསུམ་པ་, Wylie: sum cu rtsa gsum pa; Vietnamese: Trời Đao Lợi/ Trời Tam Thập Tam; Chinese: 忉利天/三十三天; Japanese: Tōri-ten; Korean: 도리천; Burmese: တာဝတိံသာ; Thai: ดาวดึงส์, ไตรตรึงศ์, ตาวติํสา or ตฺรายสฺตฺริศ) – The world "of the Thirty-three (devas)" is a wide flat space on the top of Mount Sumeru, filled with the gardens and palaces of the devas. Its ruler is Śakro devānām indra, शक्रो देवानामिन्द्रः "Śakra, lord of the devas or King of devas". Śakra's consort Shachi devi live in this heaven. Besides the eponymous thirty-three gods and goddesses, many other devas and supernatural beings, known as Varuna and Vayu dwell here, including the attendants of the devas and many heavenly courtesans (apsaras or nymphs). Sakka and the devas honor sages and holy men. Many devas dwelling here live in mansions in the air. The beings of this world are 1,500 feet (460 m) tall and live for 36,000,000 years (Sarvāstivāda tradition) or 3/4 of a yojana tall and live for 30,000,000 years (Vibhajyavāda tradition). The height of this world is 80 yojanas above the Earth.
- Cāturmahārājakāyika चातुर्महाराजिक or Cātummahārājika चातुम्महाराजिक (Tibetan: རྒྱལ་ཆེན་བཞི་, Wylie: rgyal chen bzhi; Vietnamese: Trời Tứ Thiên Vương; Chinese: 四大天王; Japanese: Shidaiōshu-ten; Korean: 사천왕; Burmese: စတုမဟာရာဇ်; Thai: จาตุมฺมหาราชิกา or จาตุรมหาราชิกกายิกา) – The world "of the Four Heavenly Kings" is found on the lower slopes of Mount Sumeru, though some of its inhabitants live in the air around the mountain. Its rulers are the Four Heavenly Kings of the name, Virūḍhaka विरूढकः, king of the Southern Direction, is lord of the kumbandas; Dhṛtarāṣṭra धृतराष्ट्रः, king of the Eastern Direction, is lord of the gandhabbas; Virūpākṣa विरूपाक्षः, king of the Western Direction, is lord of the nagas; and their leader Vaiśravaṇa वैश्रवणः, also known as Kuvera, who rules as king of the Northern Direction, is lord of the yakkhas, but ultimately all are accountable to Sakra. They are the martial kings who guard the four quarters of the Earth. The Garudas and the devas who guide the Sun and Moon are also considered part of this world, as are the retinues of the four kings, composed of Kumbhāṇḍas कुम्भाण्ड (dwarfs), Gandharvas गन्धर्व (fairies), Nāgas नाग (dragons) and Yakṣas यक्ष (goblins). These devas also inhabit remote areas such as forests, hills, and abandoned caves. Though living in misery they have the potential for awakening and can attain the path and fruits of the spiritual life. The beings of this world are 750 feet (230 m) tall and live for 9,000,000 years (Sarvāstivāda tradition) or 90,000 years (Vibhajyavāda tradition). The height of this world is from sea level up to 40 yojanas above the Earth.
- Asura असुर (Tibetan: ལྷ་མ་ཡིན་, Wylie: lha ma yin; Vietnamese: A Tu La; Chinese: 阿修羅; Japanese: Ashura; Korean: 아수라; Burmese: အသူရာ; Thai: อสุรกาย – The world of the Asuras is the space at the foot of Mount Sumeru, much of which is a deep ocean. It is not the Asuras' original home, but the place they found themselves after they were hurled, drunken, from Trāyastriṃśa where they had formerly lived. The Asuras are always fighting to regain their lost kingdom on the top of Mount Sumeru, but are unable to break the guard of the Four Heavenly Kings. The Asuras are divided into many groups, and have no single ruler, but among their leaders are Vemacitrin वेमचित्री (Pāli: Vepacitti वेपचित्ती) and Rāhu. In later texts, we find the Asura realm as one of the four unhappy states of rebirth, but the Nikāya evidence however does not show that the Asura realm was regarded as a state of suffering.

The foundations of the earth All of the structures of the earth, Sumeru and the rest, extend downward to a depth of 80,000 yojanas below sea level – the same as the height of Sumeru above sea level. Below this is a layer of "golden earth", a substance compact and firm enough to support the weight of Sumeru. It is 320,000 yojanas in depth and so extends to 400,000 yojanas below sea level. The layer of golden earth in turn rests upon a layer of water, which is 8,000,000 yojanas in depth, going down to 8,400,000 yojanas below sea level. Below the layer of water is a "circle of wind", which is 16,000,000 yojanas in depth and also much broader in extent, supporting 1,000 different worlds upon it. Yojanas are equivalent to about 13 km (8 mi).

==== Earthly realms ====
- Manuṣyaloka मनुष्यलोक (Tibetan: མི་, Wylie: mi; Vietnamese: Người; Chinese: 人; Japanese: nin; Korean: 인; Burmese: မနုဿဘုံ; Thai: มนุสสภูมิ or มนุษยโลก) – This is the world of humans and human-like beings who live on the surface of the earth. Birth in this plane results from giving and moral discipline of middling quality. This is the realm of moral choice where destiny can be guided. The Khana Sutta mentioned that this plane is a unique balance of pleasure and pain. It facilitates the development of virtue and wisdom to liberate oneself from the entire cycle of rebirths. For this reason rebirth as a human being is considered precious according to the Chiggala Sutta. The mountain-rings that engird Sumeru are surrounded by a vast ocean, which fills most of the world. The ocean is in turn surrounded by a circular mountain wall called Cakravāḍa चक्रवाड (Pāli: Cakkavāḷa चक्कवाळ; Thai: จักรวาล or จกฺกวาฬ) which marks the horizontal limit of the world. In this ocean there are four continents which are, relatively speaking, small islands in it. Because of the immenseness of the ocean, they cannot be reached from each other by ordinary sailing vessels, although in the past, when the cakravartin kings ruled, communication between the continents was possible by means of the treasure called the cakraratna (Pāli cakkaratana), which a cakravartin king and his retinue could use to fly through the air between the continents.
  - The four continents are:
    - Jambudvīpa जम्वुद्वीप or Jambudīpa जम्बुदीप (Tibetan: འཛམ་བུའི་གླིང་, Wylie: 'dzam bu gling; Vietnamese: Diêm Phù Đề or Nam Thiệm Bộ Châu; Chinese: 閻浮提 or 贍部洲; Japanese: Enbudai; Korean: 염부제; Burmese: ဇမ္ဗုဒီပ; Thai: ชมพูทวีป) is located in the south and is the dwelling of ordinary human beings. It is said to be shaped "like a cart", or rather a blunt-nosed triangle with the point facing south. (This description probably echoes the shape of the coastline of southern India.) It is 10,000 yojanas in extent (Vibhajyavāda tradition) or has a perimeter of 6,000 yojanas (Sarvāstivāda tradition) to which can be added the southern coast of only 3.5 yojanas' length. The continent takes its name from a giant Jambu tree(Syzygium cumini), 100 yojanas tall, which grows in the middle of the continent. Every continent has one of these giant trees. All Buddhas appear in Jambudvīpa. The people here are five to six feet tall and their length of life varies between 10 and about 80,000 years.
    - Pūrvavideha पूर्वविदेह or Pubbavideha पुब्बविदेह (Tibetan: ལུས་འཕགས་པོ་, Wylie: lus 'phags po; Vietnamese: Đông Thắng Thần Châu; Burmese: ပုဗ္ဗဝိဒေဟ; Thai: ปุพพวิเทหทีป or บูรพวิเทหทวีป; Chinese: 勝身洲 is located in the east, and is shaped like a semicircle with the flat side pointing westward (i.e., towards Sumeru). It is 7,000 yojanas in extent (Vibhajyavāda tradition) or has a perimeter of 6,350 yojanas of which the flat side is 2,000 yojanas long (Sarvāstivāda tradition). Its tree is the acacia, or Albizia lebbeck (Sukhōthai tradition) and the people here are about 12 feet (3.7 m) tall and they live for 700 years. Their main work is trading and buying materials.
    - Aparagodānīya अपरगोदानीय or Aparagoyāna अपरगोयान (Tibetan: བ་ལང་སྤྱོད་, Wylie: ba lang spyod; Vietnamese: Tây Ngưu Hoá Châu; Burmese: အပရဂေါယာန; Thai: อปรโคยานทวีป or อปรโคทานียทวีป; Chinese: 牛貨洲) is located in the west, and is shaped like a circle with a circumference of about 7,500 yojanas (Sarvāstivāda tradition). The tree of this continent is a giant Kadamba tree (Anthocephalus chinensis). The human inhabitants of this continent do not live in houses but sleep on the ground. Their main transportation is Bullock cart. They are about 24 feet (7.3 m) tall and they live for 500 years.
    - Uttarakuru उत्तरकुरु (Tibetan: སྒྲ་མི་སྙན་, Wylie: sgra mi snyan; Vietnamese: Bắc Câu Lư Châu; Burmese: ဥတ္တရကုရု; Thai: อุตรกุรุทวีป; Chinese: 俱盧州) is located in the north, and is shaped like a square. It has a perimeter of 8,000 yojanas, being 2,000 yojanas on each side. This continent's giant tree is called a kalpavṛkṣa कल्पवृक्ष (Pāli: kapparukkha कप्परुक्ख) or kalpa-tree, because it lasts for the entire kalpa. The inhabitants of Uttarakuru have cities built in the air. They are said to be extraordinarily wealthy, not needing to labor for a living – as their food grows by itself – and having no private property. They are about 48 feet (15 m) tall and live for 1,000 years, and they are under the protection of Vaiśravaṇa.
- Tiryagyoni-loka तिर्यग्योनिलोक or Tiracchāna-yoni तिरच्छानयोनि (Tibetan: དུད་འགྲོ་, Wylie: dud 'gro; Vietnamese: Súc Sanh; Chinese: 畜生; Japanese: chikushō; Korean: 축생; Burmese: တိရစ္ဆာန်ဘုံ; Thai: เดรัจฉานภูมิ or ติรยคฺโยนิโลก) – This world comprises all members of the animal kingdom that are capable of feeling suffering, regardless of size. The animal realm includes animals, insects, fish, birds, worms, etc..
- Pretaloka प्रेतलोक or Petaloka पेतलोक (Tibetan: ཡི་དྭགས་, Wylie: yi dwags; Vietnamese: Ngạ Quỷ; Chinese: 餓鬼; Japanese: gaki; Korean: 아귀; Burmese: ပြိတ္တာ; Thai: เปรตภูมิ or เปตฺตโลก) – The pretas, or "hungry ghosts", are mostly dwellers on earth, though due to their mental state they perceive it very differently from humans. This is the realm where ghost and unhappy spirits wander in vain, hopelessly in search of sensual fulfillment.

==== Hells (Narakas) ====
Naraka नरक or Niraya निरय (Tibetan: དམྱལ་བ་, Wylie: dmyal ba; Vietnamese: Địa Ngục hoặc Na-Lạc-Ca; Burmese: ငရဲ; Thai: นรก) is the name given to one of the worlds of greatest suffering, usually translated into English as "hell" or "purgatory". These are realms of extreme sufferings. As with the other realms, a being is born into one of these worlds as a result of their karma, and resides there for a finite length of time until their karma has achieved its full result, after which they will be reborn in one of the higher worlds as the result of an earlier karma that had not yet ripened. The mentality of a being in the hells corresponds to states of extreme fear and helpless anguish in humans.

Physically, Naraka is thought of as a series of layers extending below Jambudvīpa into the earth. There are several schemes for counting these Narakas and enumerating their torments. One of the more common is that of the Eight Cold Narakas and Eight Hot Narakas.

===== Eight Great Cold Narakas =====
- Arbuda अर्बुद – the "blister" Naraka
- Nirarbuda निरर्बुद – the "burst blister" Naraka
- Ataṭa अतट – the Naraka of shivering
- Hahava हहव – the Naraka of lamentation
- Huhuva हुहुव – the Naraka of chattering teeth
- Utpala उत्पल – the Naraka of skin becoming blue as a blue lotus
- Padma पद्म – the Naraka of cracking skin
- Mahāpadma महापद्म – the Naraka of total frozen bodies falling apart

===== Eight Great Hot Narakas =====
- Sañjīva सञ्जीव (Burmese: သိဉ္ဇိုး ငရဲ; Thai: สัญชีวมหานรก) – the "reviving" Naraka.
- Kālasūtra कालसूत्र (Burmese: ကာဠသုတ် ငရဲ; Thai: กาฬสุตตมหานรก/กาลสูตร) – the "black thread" Naraka.
- Saṃghāta संघात (Burmese: သင်္ဃာတ ငရဲ; Thai: สังฆาฏมหานรก or สํฆาต) – the "crushing" Naraka.
- Raurava/Rīrava रौरव/रीरव (Burmese: ရောရုဝ ငရဲ; Thai: โรรุวมหานรก) – the "screaming" Naraka.
- Mahāraurava/Mahārīrava महारौरव/महारीरव (Burmese: မဟာရောရုဝ ငရဲ; Thai: มหาโรรุวมหานรก) – the "great screaming" Naraka.
- Tāpana/Tapana तापन/तपन (Burmese: တာပန ငရဲ; Thai: ตาปนมหานรก) – the "heating" Naraka.
- Mahātāpana महातापन (Burmese: မဟာတာပန ငရဲ; Thai: มหาตาปนมหานรก) – the "great heating" Naraka.
- Avīci अवीचि (Burmese: အဝီစိ ငရဲ; Thai: อเวจีมหานรก/อวิจี) – the "uninterrupted" Naraka.

=== Horizontal cosmology – Sahasra cosmology ===
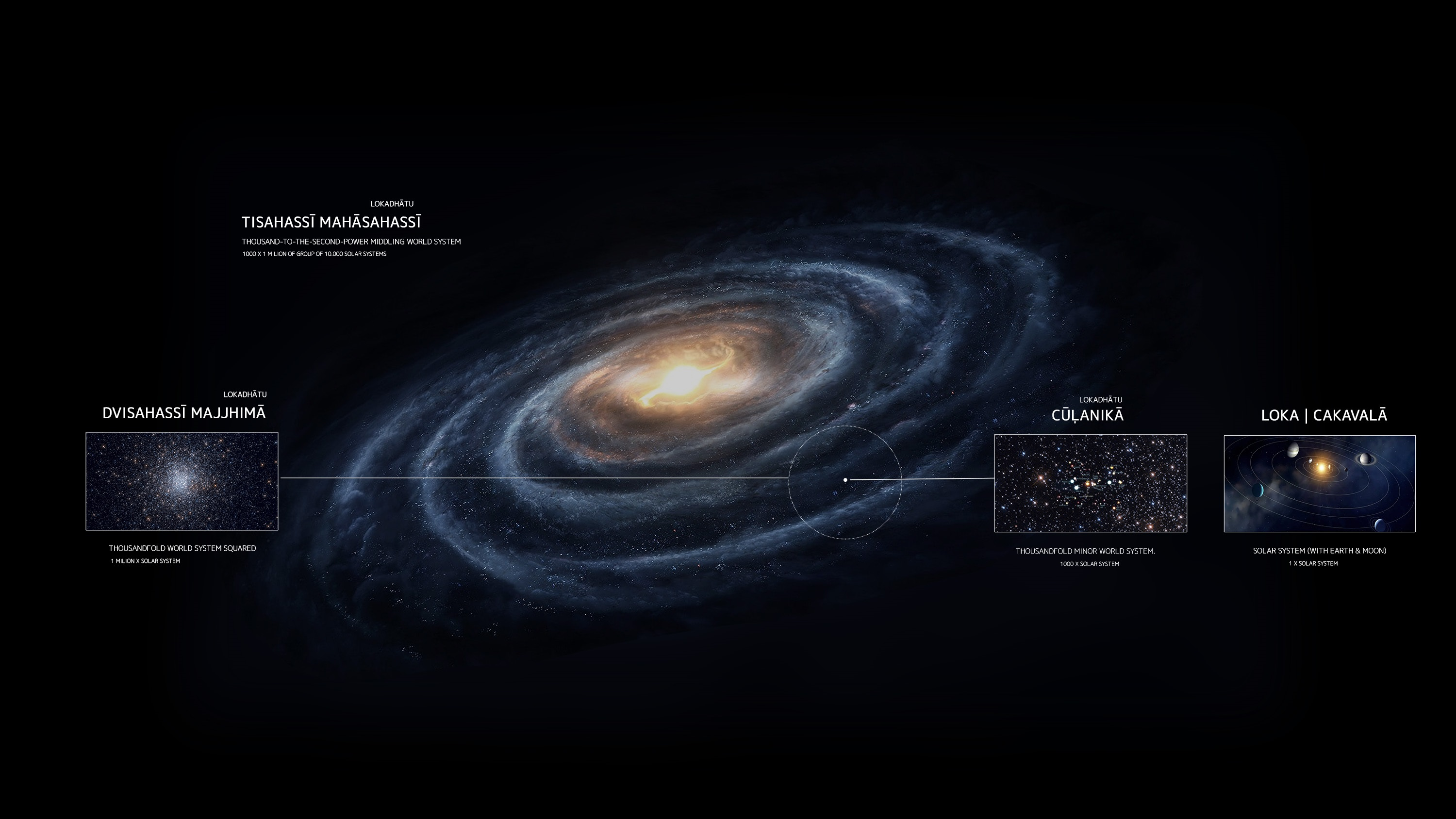
Buddhist cosmological image of alternate world systems.

Sahasra means "one thousand". All of the planes, from the plane of neither perception nor non-perception (nevasanna-asanna-ayatana) down to the Avīci – the "without interval" niraya – constitutes the single world-system, Cakkavāla (intimating something circular, a "wheel" or one Planetary system, but the etymology is uncertain), described above. A collection of one thousand systems are called a "thousandfold minor world-system" (Culanika Lokadhātu) or a small chiliocosm. A collection of a million systems is a "thousandfold to the second power middling world-system" (Dvisahassi Majjhima Lokadhātu) or a medium dichiliocosm. The largest grouping, which consists of a billion world-systems, is called (Trisahassi Mahasassi Lokadhātu), a great trichiliocosm or The Galaxy. The Tathagata, if he so wished, could effect his voice and divine power throughout a great trichiliocosm. He does so by suffusing the trichiliocosm with his radiance, at which point the inhabitants of those world-system will perceive this light, and then proceeds to extend his voice and powers throughout that realm.

=== Temporal cosmology ===
Buddhist temporal cosmology describes how the universe comes into being and is dissolved. Like other Indian cosmologies, it assumes an infinite span of time and is cyclical. This does not mean that the same events occur in identical form with each cycle, but merely that, as with the cycles of day and night or summer and winter, certain natural events occur over and over to give some structure to time.

The basic unit of time measurement is the mahākalpa or "Great Eon" (Chinese: 大劫 dàjié; Japanese: 大劫 daigō; Thai: มหากัปป์ or มหากัลป์; Devanagari: महाकल्प / महाकप्प). The length of this time in human years is never defined exactly, but it is meant to be very long, to be measured in billions of years if not longer.

==== Maha Kalpa ====
The word kalpa, means 'moment'. A maha kalpa consists of four moments (kalpa), the first of which is creation. The creation moment consists of the creation of the "receptacle", and the descent of beings from higher realms into more coarse forms of existence. During the rest of the creation moment, the world is populated. Human beings who exist at this point have no limit on their lifespan. The second moment is the duration moment, the start of this moment is signified by the first sentient being to enter hell (niraya), the hells and nirayas not existing or being empty prior to this moment. The duration moment consists of twenty "intermediate" moments (antarakappas), which unfold in a drama of the human lifespan descending from 80,000 years to 10, and then back up to 80,000 again. The interval between 2 of these "intermediate" moments is the "seven day purge", in which a variety of humans will kill each other (not knowing or recognizing each other), some humans will go into hiding. At the end of this purge, they will emerge from hiding and repopulate the world. After this purge, the lifespan will increase to 80,000, reach its peak and descend, at which point the purge will happen again.

Within the duration 'moment', this purge and repeat cycle seems to happen around 18 times, the first "intermediate" moment consisting only of the descent from 80,000 – the second intermediate moment consisting of a rise and descent, and the last consisting only of an ascent.

After the duration 'moment' is the dissolution moment, the hells will gradually be emptied, as well as all coarser forms of existence. The beings will flock to the form realms (rupa dhatu), a destruction of fire occurs, sparing everything from the realms of the 'radiant' gods and above (abha deva).

After 7 of these destructions by 'fire', a destruction by water occurs, and everything from the realms of the 'pleasant' gods and above is spared (subha deva).

After 64 of these destructions by fire and water, that is – 56 destructions by fire, and 7 by water – a destruction by wind occurs, this eliminates everything below the realms of the 'fruitful' devas (vehapphala devas, literally of "great fruit"). The pure abodes (suddhavasa, meaning something like pure, unmixed, similar to the connotation of "pure bred German shepherd"), are never destroyed. Although without the appearance of a Buddha, these realms may remain empty for a long time. The inhabitants of these realms have exceedingly long life spans.

The formless realms are never destroyed because they do not consist of form (rupa). The reason the world is destroyed by fire, water and wind, and not earth is because earth is the 'receptacle'.

After the dissolution moment, this particular world system remains dissolved for a long time, this is called the 'empty' moment, but the more accurate term would be "the state of being dissolved". The beings that inhabited this realm formerly will migrate to other world systems, and perhaps return if their journeys lead here again.

A mahākalpa is divided into four kalpas or "eons" (Chinese and Japanese: 劫; pinyin: jié; rōmaji: kō; Thai: กัป; अन्तरकल्प), each distinguished from the others by the stage of evolution of the universe during that kalpa. The four kalpas are:

- Vivartakalpa विवर्तकल्प "Eon of evolution" – during this kalpa the universe comes into existence.
- Vivartasthāyikalpa विवर्तस्थायिकल्प "Eon of evolution-duration" – during this kalpa the universe remains in existence in a steady state.
- Saṃvartakalpa संवर्तकल्प "Eon of dissolution" – during this kalpa the universe dissolves.
- Saṃvartasthāyikalpa संवर्तस्थायिकल्प "Eon of dissolution-duration" – during this kalpa the universe remains in a state of emptiness.

Each one of these kalpas is divided into twenty antarakalpas अन्तरकल्प (Pāli: antarakappa अन्तरकप्प; Chinese: 中劫, Japanese: 中劫 "inside eons"; Thai: อันตรกัป) each of about the same length. For the Saṃvartasthāyikalpa this division is merely nominal, as nothing changes from one antarakalpa to the next; but for the other three kalpas it marks an interior cycle within the kalpa.

==== Vivartakalpa ====
The Vivartakalpa begins with the arising of the primordial wind, which begins the process of building up the structures of the universe that had been destroyed at the end of the last mahākalpa. As the extent of the destruction can vary, the nature of this evolution can vary as well, but it always takes the form of beings from a higher world being born into a lower world. The example of a Mahābrahmā being the rebirth of a deceased Ābhāsvara deva is just one instance of this, which continues throughout the Vivartakalpa until all the worlds are filled from the Brahmaloka down to Avīci Hell During the Vivartakalpa the first humans appear; they are not like present-day humans, but are beings shining in their own light, capable of moving through the air without mechanical aid, living for a very long time, and not requiring sustenance; they are more like a type of lower deity than present-day humans are.

Over time, they acquire a taste for physical nutriment, and as they consume it, their bodies become heavier and more like human bodies; they lose their ability to shine, and begin to acquire differences in their appearance, and their length of life decreases. They differentiate into two sexes and begin to become sexually active. Then greed, theft and violence arise among them, and they establish social distinctions and government and elect a king to rule them, called Mahāsammata। महासम्मत, "the great appointed one". Some of them begin to hunt and eat the flesh of animals, which have by now come into existence.

==== Vivartasthāyikalpa ====
===== First antarakalpa =====
The Vivartasthāyikalpa begins when the first being is born into Naraka, thus filling the entire universe with beings. During the first antarakalpa of this eon, the duration of human lives declines from a vast but unspecified number of years (but at least several tens of thousands of years) toward the modern lifespan of less than 100 years. At the beginning of the antarakalpa, people are still generally happy. They live under the rule of a universal monarch or "wheel-turning king" (Sanskrit: Chakravartin चक्रवर्ति; Chinese: 轉輪聖王; pinyin: Zhuǎnlún Shèngwáng; Japanese: 転輪聖王; rōmaji: Tenrin Jō-ō; Korean: 전륜성왕; romaja: Jeonryun-seongwang; Thai: พระเจ้าจักรพรรดิ Phracêā cạkrphrrdi), who conquer. The Mahāsudassana-sutta (DN.17) tells of the life of a cakravartin king, Mahāsudassana (Sanskrit: Mahāsudarśana) who lived for 336,000 years. The Cakkavatti-sīhanāda-sutta (DN.26) tells of a later dynasty of cakravartins, Daḷhanemi (Sanskrit: Dṛḍhanemi) and five of his descendants, who had a lifespan of over 80,000 years. The seventh of this line of cakravartins broke with the traditions of his forefathers, refusing to abdicate his position at a certain age, pass the throne on to his son, and enter the life of a śramaṇa श्रमण. As a result of his subsequent misrule, poverty increased; as a result of poverty, theft began; as a result of theft, capital punishment was instituted; and as a result of this contempt for life, murders and other crimes became rampant.

The human lifespan now quickly decreased from 80,000 to 100 years, apparently decreasing by about half with each generation (this is perhaps not to be taken literally), while with each generation other crimes and evils increased: lying, greed, hatred, sexual misconduct, disrespect for elders. During this period, according to the Mahāpadāna-sutta (DN.14) three of the four Buddhas of this antarakalpa lived: Kakusandha Buddha क्रकुच्छन्दः (Pāli: Kakusandha ककुन्ध), at the time when the lifespan was 40,000 years; Kanakamuni कनकमुनिः Buddha (Pāli: Konāgamana कोनागमन) when the lifespan was 30,000 years; and Kāśyapa काश्यपः Buddha (Pāli: Kassapa कस्सप) when the lifespan was 20,000 years.

Our present time is taken to be toward the end of the first antarakalpa of this Vivartasthāyikalpa, when the lifespan is less than 100 years, after the life of Śākyamuni शाक्यमुनिः Buddha (Pāli: Sakyamuni ), who lived to the age of 80.

The remainder of the antarakalpa is prophesied to be miserable: lifespans will continue to decrease, and all the evil tendencies of the past will reach their ultimate in destructiveness. People will live no longer than ten years, and will marry at five; foods will be poor and tasteless; no form of morality will be acknowledged. The most contemptuous and hateful people will become the rulers. Incest will be rampant. Hatred between people, even members of the same family, will grow until people think of each other as hunters do of their prey.

Eventually a great war will ensue, in which the most hostile and aggressive will arm themselves with swords in their hands and go out to kill each other. The less aggressive will hide in forests and other secret places while the war rages. This war marks the end of the first antarakalpa.

===== Second antarakalpa =====
At the end of the war, the survivors will emerge from their hiding places and repent their evil habits. As they begin to do good, their lifespan increases, and the health and welfare of the human race will also increase with it. After a long time, the descendants of those with a 10-year lifespan will live for 80,000 years, and at that time there will be a cakravartin king named Saṅkha शंख. During his reign, the current bodhisattva in the Tuṣita heaven will descend and be reborn under the name of Ajita अजित. He will enter the life of a śramaṇa and will gain perfect enlightenment as a Buddha; and he will then be known by the name of Maitreya (मैत्रेयः, Pāli: Metteyya मेत्तेय्य).

After Maitreya's time, the world will again worsen, and the lifespan will gradually decrease from 80,000 years to 10 years again, each antarakalpa being separated from the next by devastating war, with peaks of high civilization and morality in the middle. After the 19th antarakalpa, the lifespan will increase to 80,000 and then not decrease, because the Vivartasthāyikalpa will have come to an end.

==== Saṃvartakalpa ====
The Saṃvartakalpa begins when beings cease to be born in Naraka. This cessation of birth then proceeds in reverse order up the vertical cosmology, i.e., pretas then cease to be born, then animals, then humans, and so on up to the realms of the deities.

When these worlds as far as the Brahmaloka are devoid of inhabitants, a great fire consumes the entire physical structure of the world. It burns all the worlds below the Ābhāsvara worlds. When they are destroyed, the Saṃvartasthāyikalpa begins.

==== Saṃvartasthāyikalpa ====
There is nothing to say about the Saṃvartasthāyikalpa, since nothing happens in it below the Ābhāsvara worlds. It ends when the primordial wind begins to blow and build the structure of the worlds up again.

==== Other destructions ====
The destruction by fire is the normal type of destruction that occurs at the end of the Saṃvartakalpa. But every eighth mahākalpa, after seven destructions by fire, there is a destruction by water. This is more devastating, as it eliminates not just the Brahma worlds but also the Ābhāsvara worlds.

Every sixty-fourth mahākalpa, after fifty six destructions by fire and seven destructions by water, there is a destruction by wind. This is the most devastating of all, as it also destroys the Śubhakṛtsna worlds. The higher worlds are never destroyed.

== Mahayana cosmology ==
Mahayana Buddhist cosmology presents a distinctive and expansive vision of the universe that diverges significantly from earlier non-Mahayana cosmological frameworks. While both share fundamental concepts such as Infinite cyclical existence (samsara), various realms of rebirth, and the influence of karma, Mahayana introduces a grander, more cosmic scale that emphasizes the presence of innumerable number of Buddhas, Countless number of Buddha-fields (buddhakṣetras), and Universal salvation.

Mahayana cosmology accepts most traditional Abhidharma cosmological theories, but expands on them dramatically with several key innovations, including:

=== Innumerable Buddhas and Bodhisattvas ===
Mahayana texts describe the universe as filled with countless Buddhas and Bodhisattva Mahāsattvas who actively engage in liberating all sentient beings. The Lotus Sutra depicts Buddhas projecting manifestations (Nirmanakaya) throughout the Infinite cosmos, each embodying aspects of great wisdom and compassion. These manifestations and emanations are not restricted to rare historical appearances but are constant and numerous, reflecting an Omnipresent salvific influence.

The Avataṃsaka Sūtra meanwhile describes a cosmic Fractal vision where every Atom of the universe contains infinite Buddhas teaching the Dharma to infinite beings. This radical expansion emphasizes the non-duality of space and consciousness, blurring distinctions between the ordinary and the sacred.

=== Buddha-fields (Pure Lands) ===
Mahayana cosmology envisions numerous pure lands (Skt: buddhakṣetras), with all 31 realms forming a single world system (Skt: Cakkavāḷa). One Buddha‑land is said to contain one billion world systems, purified through the great vows and spiritual powers of its own Buddha. These realms are portrayed as ideal environments for spiritual practice, accessible through faith, devotion, and the cultivation of merit.

Notable pure lands include:

- Sukhāvatī (the Western Pure Land or Eternal Land of ultimate bliss of infinite light Amitābha Buddha), where beings enjoy bliss and can easily attain enlightenment. This Buddha-land exist in beyond 1 Trillion Buddha-lands away to the Western direction from our Sahālokadhātu.
- Abhirati (The Eastern Pure Land of Akṣobhya Buddha), characterized by meditative stability and wisdom.
- Vairocana's Cosmic Realm, described in the Avataṃsaka Sūtra as a vast "Lotus Treasury World" (Padmagarbha-lokadhātu), a luminous cosmos where infinite Buddhas and bodhisattvas dwell in interpenetrating billions of universes.
- Vaiḍūryanirbhāsa (Radiant Lapis Lazuli) Buddha-land exist on eastern direction beyond the Buddha-lands equal to the grains of sand of 10 Ganges rivers, this Pureland was ruling by Medicine Buddha called Bhaiṣajyaguru Buddha.

Śākyamuni Buddha himself is said to reside in a Pure Land called "Unsurpassable" (Wúshèng), from which he manifests in this world to teach the Eternal Dharma.

=== The Ten Realms ===
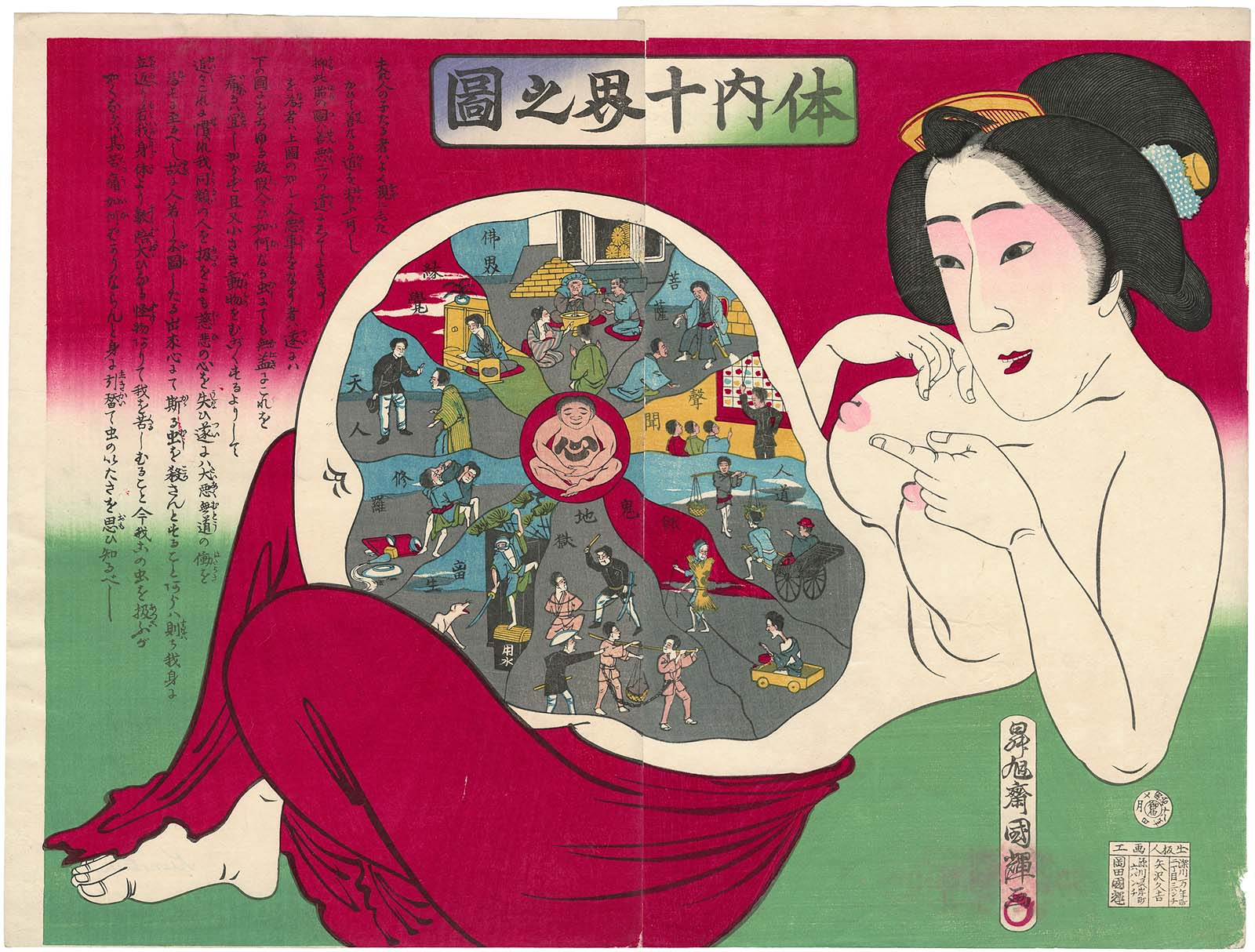
Japanese depiction of the ten realms

Expanding upon the traditional six realms of existence, Mahayana traditions (particularly East Asian schools like Tiantai) use the schema of "ten realms", which includes the traditional six realms of rebirth, plus four additional spiritual realms:

- Śrāvaka (Arhat, Disciples of the Buddha)
- Pratyekabuddha (Solitary Buddhas)
- Bodhisattva Mahāsattvas (Aspiring Buddhas)
- Buddha (Fully Awakened Enlightened Beings)

In East Asian Buddhist traditions like Tiantai, the ten realms are understood to be mutually inclusive, meaning that each realm contains the potential for all others. This idea emphasizes the universal potential for enlightenment, even in the most deluded or painful states of existence.

=== The Cosmic Buddha as the Universe Itself ===
A distinctive Mahayana innovation is the concept of the Cosmic Buddha, Vairocana, whose body encompasses the entire cosmos of Multiverse. Described in the Avataṃsaka Sūtra, Vairocana's realm is an all-encompassing Buddha-field in which all beings exist as part of the Buddha's own enlightened body. This view merges cosmology with ontology, suggesting that all reality is fundamentally sacred and interconnected. In the Shingon school of Esoteric Buddhism, this notion is symbolized by the Vajradhatu and Garbhadhatu mandalas, which depict Vairocana Buddha's cosmic body as a web of interdependent beings and worlds. This emphasizes the immanence of Buddhahood within ordinary experience.

== See also ==
- Buddhism and evolution
- Buddhist ethics
- Buddhist paths to liberation
- Four Noble Truths
- Fourteen unanswerable questions
- Index of Buddhism-related articles
- Noble Eightfold Path
- Pariyatti, paṭipatti, paṭivedha
- Six Paths

== Sources ==
- Snelling, John (1987), The Buddhist handbook, Rider
