= Human beings in Buddhism =

Part of Buddhist philosophy

Humans in Buddhism (Sanskrit: मनुष्य, IAST: manuṣya, Pali manussa) are the subjects of an extensive commentarial literature that examines the nature and qualities of a human life from the point of view of humans' ability to achieve enlightenment. In Buddhism, humans are just one type of sentient being, that is a being with a mindstream. In Sanskrit Manushya means an Animal with a mind. In Sanskrit the word Manusmriti associated with Manushya was used to describe knowledge through memory. The word Muun or Maan means mind. Mind is collection of past experience with an ability of memory or smriti. Mind is considered as an animal with a disease that departs a soul from its universal enlightened infinitesimal behavior to the finite miserable fearful behavior that fluctuates between the state of heaven and hell before it is extinguished back to its infinitesimal behavior.

In Enlightenment as an arhat can be attained from the realms of the Śuddhāvāsa deities. A bodhisattva can appear in many different types of lives, for instance as an animal or as a deva. Buddhas, however, are always human.

== Qualities of human life ==
The status of life as a human, at first is seen as very important. In the hierarchy of Buddhist cosmology it is low but not entirely at the bottom. It is not intrinsically marked by extremes of happiness or suffering, but all the states of consciousness in the universe, from hellish suffering to divine joy to serene tranquility can be experienced within the human world.

Humans can be seen as highly favored, in that they have an immediate reason to seek out the Dharma and yet also have the means to listen to it and follow it. Among the lower realms, Pretas (a.k.a. hungry ghosts), and dwellers in the Narakas (Buddhist hell(s)) are gripped by pain and fear, and can only endure their lot but cannot better themselves. Animals are intellectually unable to understand the Dharma in full. The way of life of the Asuras is dominated by violence and antithetical to the teachings of the Dharma. Most of the Brahmas and Devas simply enjoy reaping the fruits of their past actions and think that they are immortal and forever to be happy and so they do not try to practice the Dharma. When their past karmas have all had their result, these devas will fall into lower worlds and suffer again. The lowest sorts of devas deal with strife, love, and loss just as humans do, but even so they lack the spur of imminent mortality that can lead humans to seek, not merely a better future life, but an escape from saṃsāra altogether. However, there are stories of beings in these realms deciding to practice and reaching enlightenment.

For this reason, life in the world of humans is known as "the precious human rebirth". Born close to the pivot point of happiness and suffering, humans have a unique capacity for moral choices with long-term significance.

The human rebirth is said to be extremely rare. The Majjhima Nikaya (129 Balapandita Sutta) compares it to a wooden cattle-yoke floating on the waves of the sea, tossed this way and that by the winds and currents. The likelihood of a blind turtle, rising from the depths of the ocean to the surface once in a hundred years, putting its head through the hole in the yoke is considered greater than that of a being in the animal realm, hungry ghost realm or hell realm achieving rebirth as a human. This is because, according to the sutta, in these realms there is no Dhamma (Sanskrit Dharma), no practicing what is right, no doing what is wholesome, and no performing of merit. However it is generally implied that if one is already living as a human they will continue to be reborn in the human world based on good works and so they will be one again and again as long as they are moral and good in the ways described in Buddhist rules regardless of whether or not they are Buddhist themselves. The idea is that one must be good and moral because falling below the human realm is dangerous as the odds of one becoming a human again with any great frequency is slim.

Among humans there are also better and worse conditions for attaining enlightenment. Besides being born as a human, the favorable conditions for obtaining enlightenment are:

- Being born a human at a time when a Buddha has arisen, has taught the Dharma, and has left a Saṅgha that carries on the teachings; at such times there is a chance to learn the Dharma.
- Being born a human in countries where the Dharma is known. Buddhist commentaries contrast the "central lands" where Buddhism is known and can be practiced (originally just northern India, but now including a much larger portion of the globe) with "border countries" where Buddhism is unknown or cannot be practiced due to legal or practical impediments, for instance, a lack of qualified teachers. Technically a "central land" is one which possesses any one of the Buddhist saṅghas of bhikṣus, bhikṣuṇīs, upāsakas or upāsikās.
- Being born a human who has the physical and intellectual capacity to grasp the basic message of the Dharma.
- Accepting the relationship between good or evil actions and their consequences, believing that good actions will lead to a happier life, a better rebirth or to enlightenment.
- Confidence in the moral teachings conveyed in the Vinaya.
- Avoiding crimes against people and against the Dharma.
- Having sincere compassion for other people.

Just as it is difficult to obtain birth as a human, it is also difficult to be born at the time when a Buddha's teaching is still available. Out of the infinite kalpas (incredibly long periods) in time, most have no Buddhas appearing in them at all. The present kalpa is called "Fortunate" because it is said that 1,000 Buddhas will appear in it, something that is very unusual.

For this reason, Buddhist teachers say that one's present condition as a human should be valued very highly, and not allowed to slide by, as the combination of existence as a human and the presence of a Buddha's teaching may not come again for a very long time. Any human, in this view, who is in a position to learn the Dharma, would be remiss to not take advantage of it. This view also stands in contrast to those who would claim that, if one is to be reborn multiple times, there is no need to worry about one's actions in this life as they can always be amended in the future; rather, there is no assurance that in a long series of lives one will ever obtain the right circumstances for enlightenment, so it is important to seize the day.

With regard to a fortunate human life, Pabongkhapa Déchen Nyingpo said: "Instead of feeling so much regret when we lose our money, we should develop regret when we waste our human life."

== Human origin ==
According to the Aggañña Sutta (DN.27), humans originated at the beginning of the current kalpa as Brahma-like beings reborn from the Ābhāsvara Brahma-realm. They were then beings shining in their own light, capable of moving through the air without mechanical aid, living for a very long time, and not requiring sustenance.

Over time, they acquired a taste for physical nutriment, and as they consumed it, their bodies became heavier and more like human bodies; they lost their ability to shine, and began to acquire differences in their appearance. Their length of life decreased, they differentiated into two sexes and became sexually active. Following this, greed, theft and violence arose among them, and they consequently established social distinctions and government and elected a king to rule them, called Mahāsammata, "the great appointed one". Some of the kings of India in the Buddha's day claimed descent from him.

== Nature of the human realm ==
In the visionary picture of the human realm presented in Buddhist cosmology, humans live on four continents which are, relatively speaking, small islands in a vast ocean that surrounds the axial world-mountain of Sumeru, and fills most of the Earth's surface. The ocean is in turn surrounded by a circular mountain wall called Cakravāḍa (Sanskrit) or Cakkavāḷa (Pāli) which marks the horizontal limit of the earth. Because of the immenseness of the ocean, the continents cannot be reached from each other by ordinary sailing vessels, although in the past, when the cakravartin kings ruled, communication between the continents was possible by means of the treasure called the cakraratna (Pāli cakkaratana), which a cakravartin and his retinue could use to fly through the air between the continents.

The four continents are:

- Jambudvīpa (Sanskrit) or Jambudīpa (Pāli) or 南阎浮提洲 (阎浮提 is also translated as 赡部 in Chinese) is located in the south.
- Pūrvavideha or Pubbavideha or 东毗提诃洲 (毗提诃 is also translated as 胜身) is located in the east.
- Aparagodānīya or Aparagoyāna or 西瞿陀尼洲 (瞿陀尼 is also translated as 牛货) is located in the west.
- Uttarakuru or 北俱卢洲 is located in the north.

== Sources ==
- sGam.po.pa, The Jewel Ornament of Liberation, Chapter 2, translated by H.V. Guenther. JOL
- Ngorchen Konchog Lhundrub, The Beautiful Ornament of the Three Visions, translated by Lobsang Dagpa and Jay Goldberg, Section A2. BOTV
- G.P. Malalasekara, Dictionary of Pāli Proper Names
- Thus Have I Heard: The Long Discourse of the Buddha, translated by Maurice Walshe. DN
