= Śakra (Buddhism) =

Ruler of the Trāyastriṃśa Heaven

Indra Śakra
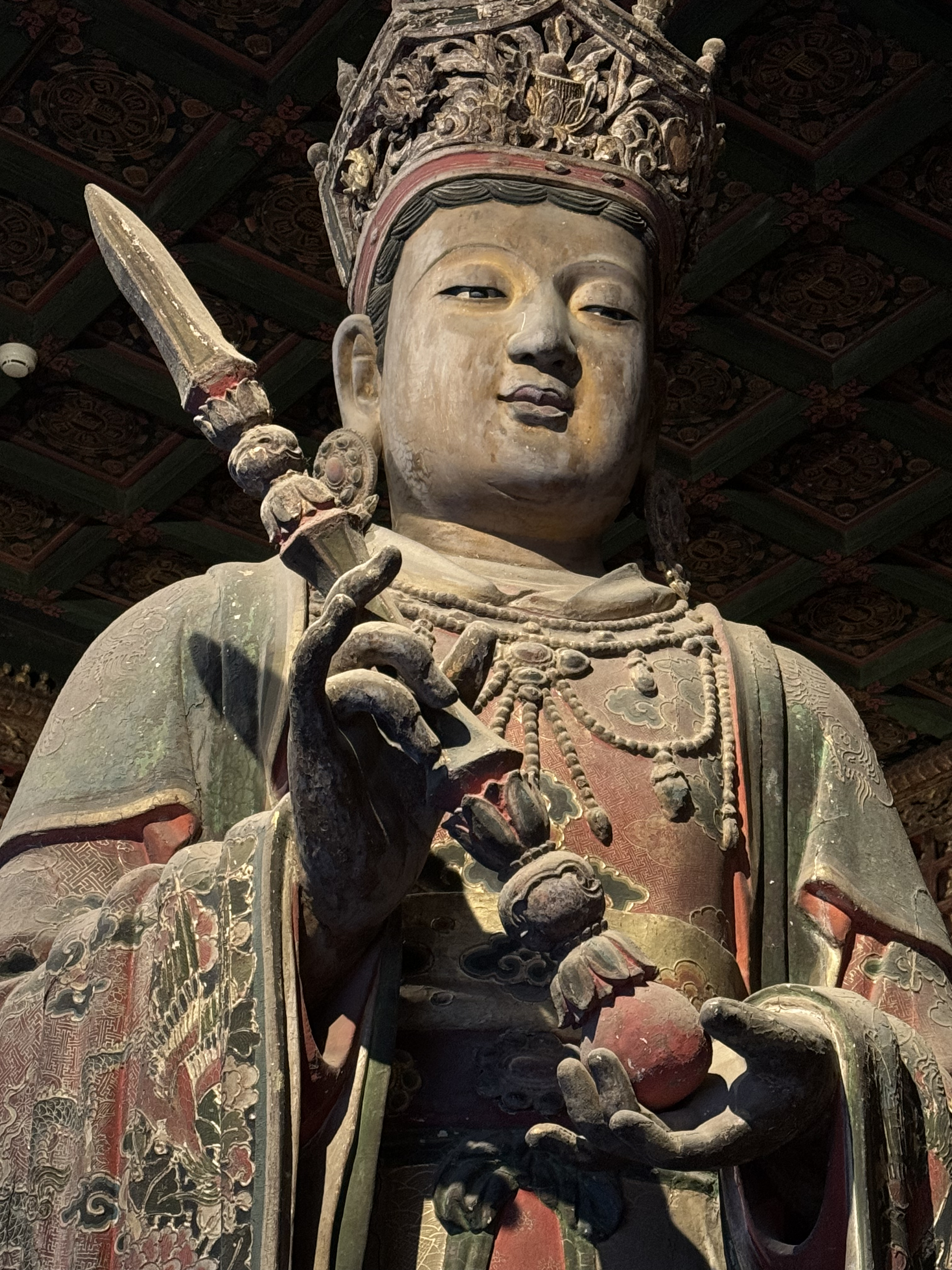
- Ming dynasty statue of Indra Śakra in Zhihua Temple in Beijing, China
- Sanskrit: शक्र; Śakra
- Pāli: सक्क; Sakka
- Burmese: သိကြား (Thagya, [ðədʑá])
- Chinese: 帝釋天 (Pinyin: Dìshìtiān) 釋提桓因 (Pinyin: Shìtí Huányīn)
- Indonesian: Kaisar surgawi yang agung Sakriwha
- Japanese: 帝釈天(たいしゃくてん) (romaji: Taishakuten) 釋提桓因(しゃくだいかんいん) (romaji: Shakudai Kan'in)
- Khmer: សក្ក (Sakkak)
- Korean: 제석천 (帝釋天) (RR: Jeseok Cheon) 석제환인 (釋提桓因) (RR: Seokje Hwan'in)
- Mongolian: Хурмаст тэнгэр / Хан хурмаст
- Sinhala: ශක්‍ර (Shakra)
- Tagalog: Sakla
- Thai: ท้าวสักกะ (Thâo Sàkkà) or พระอินทร์ (Phrâ In)
- Tibetan: བརྒྱ་སྦྱིན་ Wylie: brgya sbyin THL: da ö gya jin དབང་པོ་ Wylie: dbang po THL: wangpo
- Vietnamese: 帝釋天; Đế Thích Thiên 釋提桓因; Thích Đề Hoàn Nhân

Information
- Venerated by: Theravada, Mahayana, Vajrayana Shinbutsu-shūgō Daoism
- Attributes: Vajra, Indrajāla, banner, Conch shell, bow

Indra, with the epithet of Śakra (Sanskrit: शक्र Śakra; Pali: सक्क Sakka), is the ruler of Trāyastriṃśa Heaven according to Buddhist cosmology. The name Śakra ("powerful") as an epithet of Indra is found in several verses of the Rigveda. Indra is also referred to by the title "Śakra, Lord of the Devas" (Sanskrit: Śakro devānāṃ indraḥ; Pali: Sakko devānaṃ indo).

In East Asian cultural traditions, Indra Śakra is known as Dìshìtiān (帝釋天) or Shìtí Huányīn (釋提桓因) in Chinese, as Taishakuten (帝釈天) in Japanese, as Jeseokcheon (제석천) in Korean, and as Đế Thích Thiên (帝釋天) or Thích Đề Hoàn Nhân (釋提桓因) in Vietnamese. In Chinese Buddhism, Indra Śakra is sometimes identified with the Taoist Jade Emperor (Yùhuáng Dàdì 玉皇大帝, often simplified to Yùhuáng 玉皇); both share a birthday on the ninth day of the first lunar month of the Chinese calendar (usually in February).

The Trāyastriṃśa heaven that Indra Śakra rules is located on the top of Mount Meru, imagined to be the polar center of the physical world, around which the Sun and Moon revolve. Trāyastriṃśa is the highest of the heavens in direct contact with humankind. Like all deities, Śakra is long-lived but mortal; when one Śakra dies, his place is taken by another deity who becomes the new Śakra. However, in some traditions, Śakra is either elevated to an enlightened being or a "stream-enterer" (Pali: sotāpanna). Several stories detailing Śakra are found in the Jataka tales, as well as several suttas.

Indra Śakra is married to Sujā, daughter of the chief of the asuras, Vemacitrin (Pāli Vepacitti). Despite this relationship, a state of war generally exists between the thirty-three gods and the asuras, which Indra Śakra manages to resolve with minimal violence and no loss of life.

Indra Śakra is often depicted in literature as a being who consults the Buddha on matters of morality. Together with Brahmā, he is considered a dharmapala, a protector of Buddhism.

== Etymology ==
"Śakra" is a Sanskrit word meaning "mighty" or "powerful" and is used as an epithet of Indra in hymn 5.34 of the Rigveda. The related Pāli lexeme "Sakka" seems to have been the standard name of the king of heaven in Buddhist tradition.

== Names ==
Śakra is known by several names in Buddhist texts. Some of these include:

- Indra (Sanskrit; Chinese: 因陀羅; pinyin: Yīntuóluó; Japanese: Indara, Standard Tibetan: དབང་པོ་ dbang po)
- Mahendranīla (Sanskrit; lit. "Great Indra the Dark")
- Sahassākkha (Chinese: 娑婆婆; pinyin: Suōpópo; Japanese: Sababa; or 婆婆; Pópo; Japanese: Baba).
- Sahasrekṣaṇa (Sanskrit; Chinese: 千眼; pinyin: Qiānyǎn; lit. "Thousand Eyes")
- (Chinese: 天主; pinyin: Tiānzhǔ; lit. "Lord of Heaven")

== Theravāda ==
Sakka's mythology and character is expounded upon in the Pali Canon, particularly in the Sakka Saṃyutta of the Saṃyutta Nikāya. Sakka plays a significant role in several of the Jātaka tales.

The commentator Buddhaghoṣa has identified Sakka as being identical to Vajrapāṇi. Thus, Sakka is identified as a Bodhisattva.

In the Mahāparinibbāna Sutta (DN 16), Sakka speaks the following verse, which has become standard in Buddhist funeral rites:

Aniccā vata saṅkhārā, uppādavayadhammino. Uppajjitvā nirujjhanti, tesaṃ vūpasamo sukho.

Translation:

"Impermanent, alas, are compounded things. It is the nature of things to arise and pass away. Having come into existence they cease. Their appeasement is the highest bliss."

== Mahāyāna ==
In the Book of Equanimity, Śakra plays a central role in the fourth koan.

In the Mahāparinirvāṇa Sūtra, Śakra utters a stanza in response to the Buddha's death as a recognition of the Four Noble Truths. It is identical to the Pali formula found in the corresponding sutta.:

Anitya vata saṃskārā utpādvyayadharmiṇaḥ utpadya hi nirudhyante teṣāṃ vyupashamaḥ sukham.

Translation:

"Impermanent indeed are all formations; their nature consists of arising and disappearing; having arisen, they cease; their calming is happiness."

He is also recognized as one of the Twenty-Four Guardian Devas in Chinese Buddhist tradition.

== Iconography ==
In Southeast Asia's Theravada communities, Śakra is depicted with blue or black skin, alongside a mount, Airavata, a three-headed elephant.

== Folk belief ==
Śakra is equated with Haneullim in Korean folk religion. According to the Memorabilia of the Three Kingdoms, it is believed that Śakra is Hwanung's father.

In Chinese Buddhism, some equate him with the Jade Emperor.

In Mongolian Buddhism, Qormusta Tengri is syncretized with Śakra, and is believed to be involved with the creation of fire.

The ceremonial name of Bangkok alludes to Śakra:

Krungthepmahanakhon Amonrattanakosin Mahintharayutthaya Mahadilokphop Noppharatratchathaniburirom Udomratchaniwetmahasathan Amonphimanawatansathit Sakkathattiyawitsanukamprasit

Translation:

กรุงเทพมหานคร อมรรัตนโกสินทร์ มหินทรายุธยา มหาดิลกภพ นพรัตนราชธานีบูรีรมย์ อุดมราชนิเวศน์มหาสถาน อมรพิมานอวตารสถิต สักกะทัตติยวิษณุกรรมประสิทธิ์

This name is composed of both Pāli and Sanskrit, prefaced with the only one Thai word, Krung, which means 'capital'. It can thus be written as: "Krung-dēvamahānagara amararatanakosindra mahindrāyudhyā mahātilakabhava navaratanarājadhānī purīramya uttamarājanivēsana mahāsthāna amaravimāna avatārasthitya shakrasdattiya vishnukarmaprasiddhi."

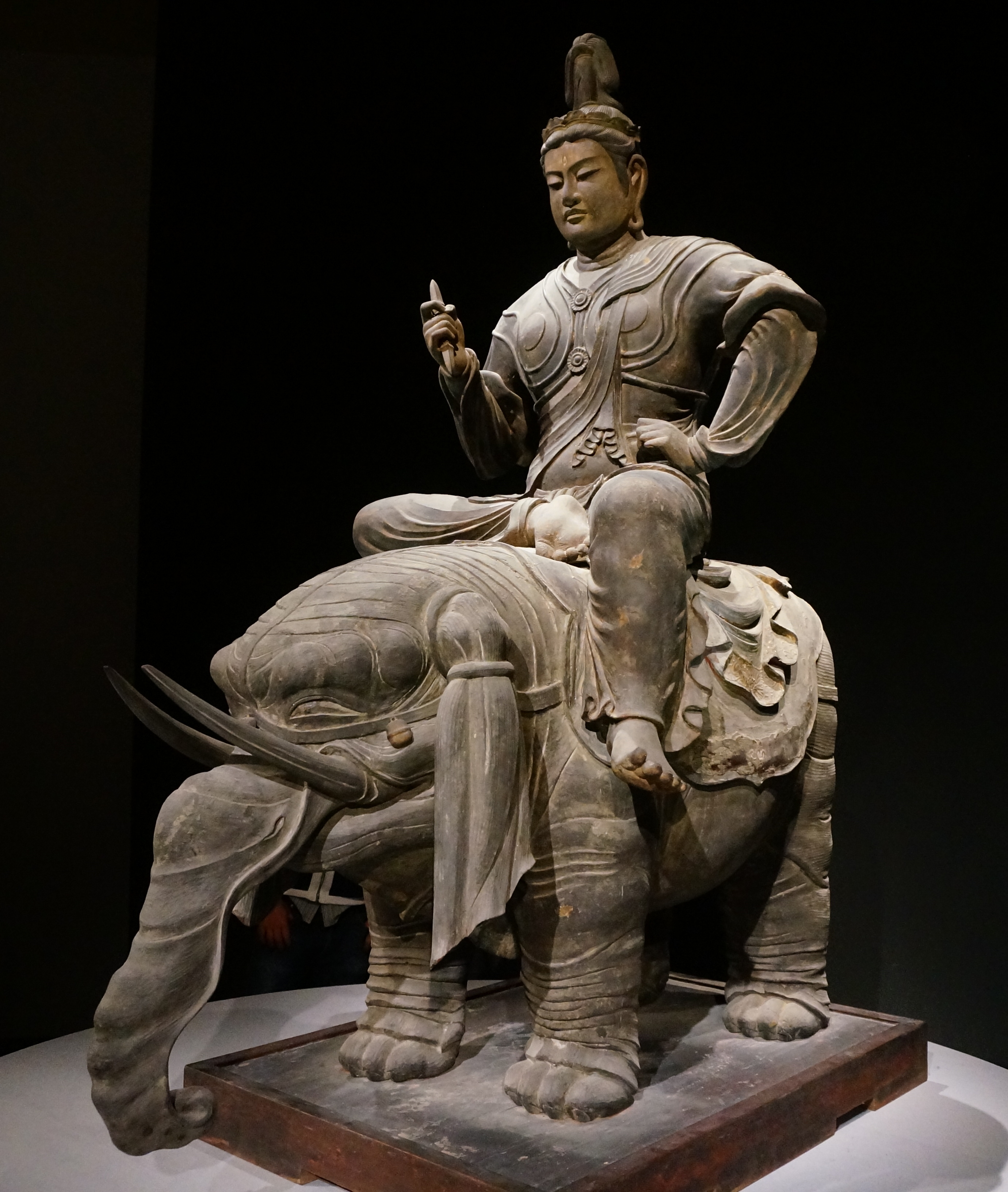
Taishakuten (Śakra), 839, Tō-ji temple, National Treasure of Japan.

== Popular culture ==
Śakra makes several appearances in popular culture, including:

- He is a character in the mobile game Monster Strike.
- He appears as a villain in the Chinese comic Fung Wan.
- He also appears as a villain in the manga series RG Veda.
- Indra Ōtsutsuki from the Naruto series is loosely based on Śakra. His younger brother's name is Asura, which plays on the myth of the battle between the deva and the asura.
- It is possible that Kami and Mr. Popo from the Dragon Ball series share a connection with Śakra. Mr. Popo's name is phonetically similar to the Chinese pronunciation of Sahassākkha (婆婆 Pópo), an epithet of Śakra. Kami's role as guardian deity is also similar to Śakra's relationship with the human world. This is further supported by the function of the Lookout, Kami's temple, which is reminiscent of Trāyastriṃśa heaven. Traditionally, this heaven is depicted as a flat surface on the top of Mt. Sumeru. There are thirty-two trees on the Lookout, which equate to the same number of palaces in Trāyastriṃśa (not counting the thirty-third, Śakra's palace, exemplified by the hyperbolic time chamber).

== See also ==
- King of the Gods

=== Counterparts of Śakra in other cultures ===
- Jade Emperor, the Chinese counterpart
- Indra, the Hindu counterpart
- Ulgen/Qormusta Tengri, the Turko-Mongolian counterpart
- Thagyamin, the Burmese Buddhist representation of Śakra, a counterpart of the Jade Emperor

== Bibliography ==
- Bhikkhu Analayo (2011). Śakra and the Destruction of Craving – A Case Study in the Role of Śakra in Early Buddhism, The Indian International Journal of Buddhist Studies 12, 157-176
- Buswell, Robert Jr; Lopez, Donald S. Jr., eds. (2013). Princeton Dictionary of Buddhism. Princeton, NJ: Princeton University Press. pp. 739–740. ISBN 9780691157863.
