= Sentient beings (Buddhism) =

Life with consciousness according to Buddhism

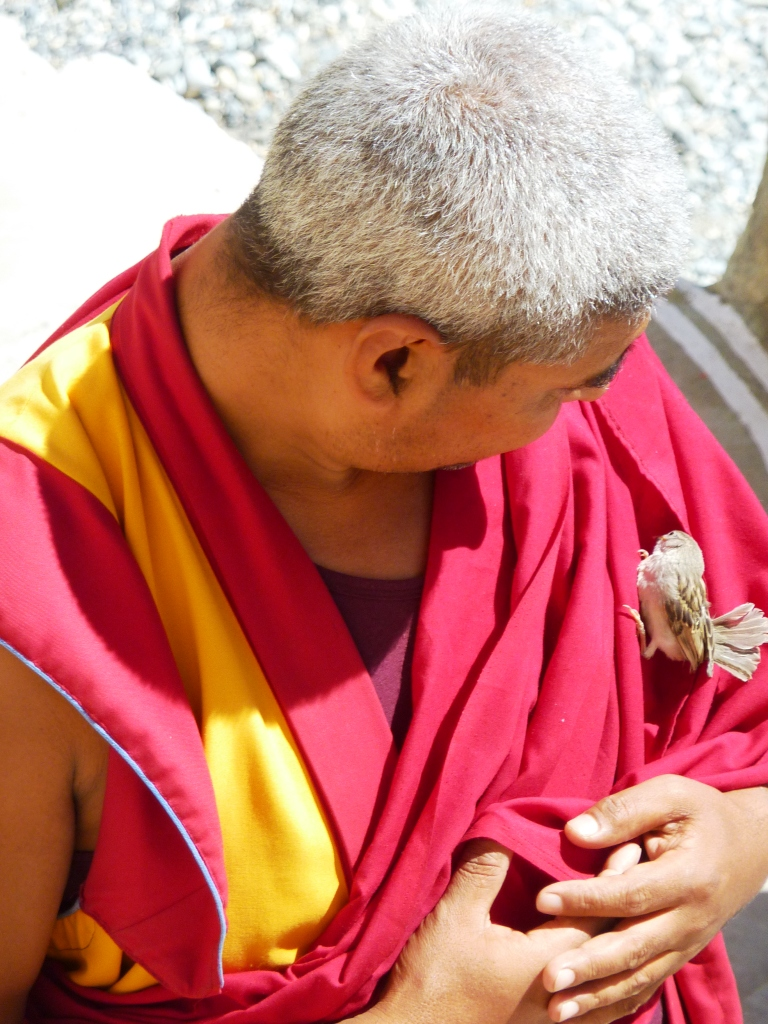
Buddhist monk protecting an injured sparrow. Likir Monastery, Ladakh, India

In Buddhism, sentient beings or living beings are beings with consciousness, sentience, or in some contexts life itself.

== Overview ==
Daniel A. Getz (2004: p. 760) provides a generalist Western Buddhist encyclopedic definition:

"Sentient beings is a term used to designate the totality of living, conscious beings that constitute the object and audience of Buddhist teaching. Translating various Sanskrit terms (jantu, bahu jana, jagat, sattva), sentient beings conventionally refers to the mass of living things subject to illusion, suffering, and rebirth (saṃsāra). Less frequently, sentient beings as a class broadly encompasses all beings possessing consciousness, including Buddhas and Bodhisattvas."

Sentient beings are composed of the five aggregates (skandhas): matter, sensation, perception, mental formations and consciousness. In the Samyutta Nikaya, the Buddha is recorded as saying that "just as the word 'chariot' exists on the basis of the aggregation of parts, even so the concept of 'being' exists when the five aggregates are available."

Early Buddhist sources classify sentient beings into five categories—divinities, humans, animals, tormented spirits, and denizens of hell—although sometimes the classification adds another category of beings called asuras between divinities and humans.

While distinctions in usage and potential subdivisions or classes of sentient beings vary from one school, teacher, or thinker to another, it principally refers to beings in contrast with buddhahood. That is, sentient beings are characteristically not awakened, and are thus confined to the death, rebirth, and dukkha (suffering) characteristic of saṃsāra. Thus, Dōgen writes "Those who greatly enlighten illusion are Buddhas; those who have great illusion in enlightenment are sentient beings."

However, Mahayana Buddhism also simultaneously teaches that sentient beings also contain Buddha-nature—the intrinsic potential to transcend the conditions of saṃsāra and attain enlightenment, thereby obtaining Buddhahood. Thus, in Mahayana, it is to sentient beings that the bodhisattva vow of compassion is pledged and sentient beings are the object of the all inclusive great compassion (maha karuna) and skillful means (upaya) of the Buddhas.

Furthermore, in East Asian Buddhism, all beings (including plant life and even inanimate objects or entities considered "spiritual" or "metaphysical" by conventional Western thought) are or may be considered beings with Buddha-nature. The idea that "inanimate" beings have Buddha nature was defended by Zhanran (711–782) of the Tiantai school as well as Japanese figures like Kūkai and Dōgen.

== See also ==
- Ahimsa in Buddhism
- Animals in Buddhism
- Buddhist vegetarianism
- Human beings in Buddhism
