= Vemacitrin =

Asura who figures prominently in many Buddhist sūtras.

Vemacitrin (Sanskrit) or Vepacitti (Pāli) is the name of a leader of the Asuras who figures prominently in many Buddhist sūtras.

Vemacitrin is the most prominent of the leaders of the Asuras in their fight with the devas of Trāyastriṃśa where they had formerly lived. After one battle he was made prisoner and bound before the throne of Śakra, ruler of Trāyastriṃśa, whom he treated with bitter verbal abuse. Śakra bore his insults patiently, and argued that such patience was a sign of strength, not of weakness. (Vepacitti-sutta, SN.xi.4)

On another occasion, Vemacitrin and Śakra had a contest of verses, before a joint company of devas and asuras. Each of them alternated with a verse of his spontaneous composition, to see who could speak best. Śakra was awarded the prize by both sides, because it was judged that Vemacitrin's verses tended entirely to contention and violence, whereas Śakra's were edifying and tended to peace and harmony. (Subhasitajaya-sutta, SN.xi.5)

Vemacitrin's daughter was named Sujā (or Sujātā). After a courtship that extended over many lives, Sujā married Śakra and Vemacitrin became his enemy's father-in-law.

== See also ==
- Viprachitti
