= Asura (Buddhism) =

Demigod in Buddhism

Translations of Asura
- Sanskrit: असुर
- Pali: असुर
- Assamese: অসুৰ (Oxur)
- Bengali: অসুর
- Burmese: အသုရာနတ်
- Chinese: 阿修羅 (Pinyin: Āxiūluó)
- Japanese: 阿(あ)修(しゅ)羅(ら) (Rōmaji: ashura)
- Khmer: អសុរ (UNGEGN: Asorak)
- Korean: 아수라 (RR: asura)
- Tamil: அசுரன்
- Tibetan: ལྷ་མ་ཡིན་ (lha.ma.yin)
- Thai: อสูร
- Vietnamese: A Tu La (Chữ Nôm: 阿修羅)

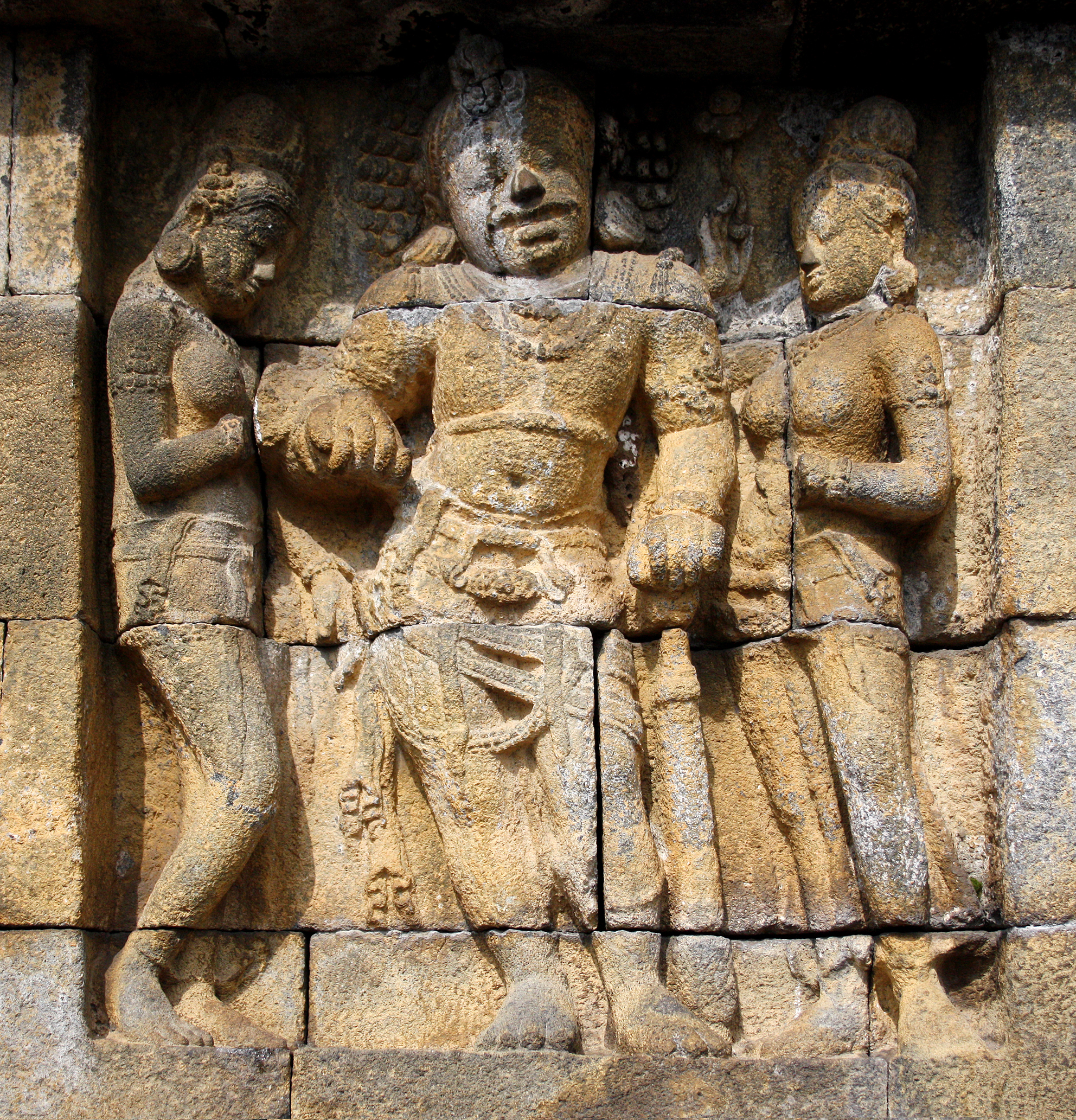
The guarding figure asura giant dvarapala holding mace flanked by two apsaras. The bas-relief of lower outer wall of Borobudur separating Kamadhatu and Rupadhatu realm. 8th century Central Java, Indonesia.

An asura (Sanskrit and Pali: असुर) in Buddhism is a demigod or titan of the Kāmadhātu. They are said to live more pleasurable lives than humans, but are also in thrall to qualities such as wrath, pride, envy, and insincerity.

== Origins and etymology ==
The Buddhist asuras have a few myths distinctive from the asuras of Hinduism, which are only found in Buddhist texts. They are thought to originate from the earlier Hindu origin asuras.

In its Buddhist context, the word is sometimes translated "titan", "demigod", or "antigod".

Buddhaghosa explains that their name derives from the myth of their defeat at the hands of the god Śakra. According to the story, the asuras were dispossessed of their state in Trāyastriṃśa because they became drunk and were thrown down Mount Sumeru. After this incident, they vowed never to drink sura again.

== Character ==
While all the gods of the Kāmadhātu are subject to passions to some degree, the asuras above all are addicted to them, especially wrath, pride, envy, insincerity, falseness, boasting, and bellicosity.

The Great Calm-Observation by Zhiyi says:

Always desiring to be superior to others, having no patience for inferiors and belittling strangers; like a hawk, flying high above and looking down on others, and yet outwardly displaying justice, worship, wisdom, and faith — this is raising up the lowest order of good and walking the way of the Asuras.

The asuras are said to experience a much more pleasurable life than humans, but they are plagued by envy for the devas, whom they can see just as animals perceive humans.

They are sometimes referred to as pūrvadeva (Pāli: pubbadeva), meaning "ancient gods."

== Deva-Asura War ==
The Asuras formerly lived in the Trāyastriṃśa world on the peak of Sumeru with the other gods of that world. When Śakra became the ruler of that world, the asuras celebrated by drinking much Gandapāna wine, a liquor so strong that Śakra forbade the other gods to drink it. Weakened by their drunkenness, the asuras could not resist when Śakra had the whole lot of them thrown over the edge of Trāyastriṃśa into what would become the Asura-world at the base of Sumeru. A tree grows there called Cittapātali; when the asuras saw it blossom, they saw that it was different from the Pāricchattaka (Sanskrit: Pāriyātra) tree which had grown in their old home, and they knew that they were dispossessed.

They now meditated on war. In armor and weapons, they climbed up the steep slopes of Sumeru "like ants." Śakra set out to meet them, but was forced to retreat because of their numbers. Passing through the forest where the garuḍas live on his flying chariot, Śakra saw that his passage was destroying the nests of the garuḍas and ordered his charioteer Mātali to turn back. When the pursuing asuras saw Śakra turn about, they felt certain that he must be coming back with an even larger army, and they fled, ceding all the ground they had gained.

Despite their many wars, there was eventually a partial concord between the Trāyastriṃśa gods and the asuras. This came about because Śakra fell in love with Sujā (also known as Shachi), daughter of the Asura chief Vemacitrin. Vemacitrin had given Sujā the right to choose her own husband at an assembly of the Asuras, and she chose Śakra, who had attended disguised as an aged Asura. Vemacitrin thus became Śakra's father-in-law.

== Cosmology ==
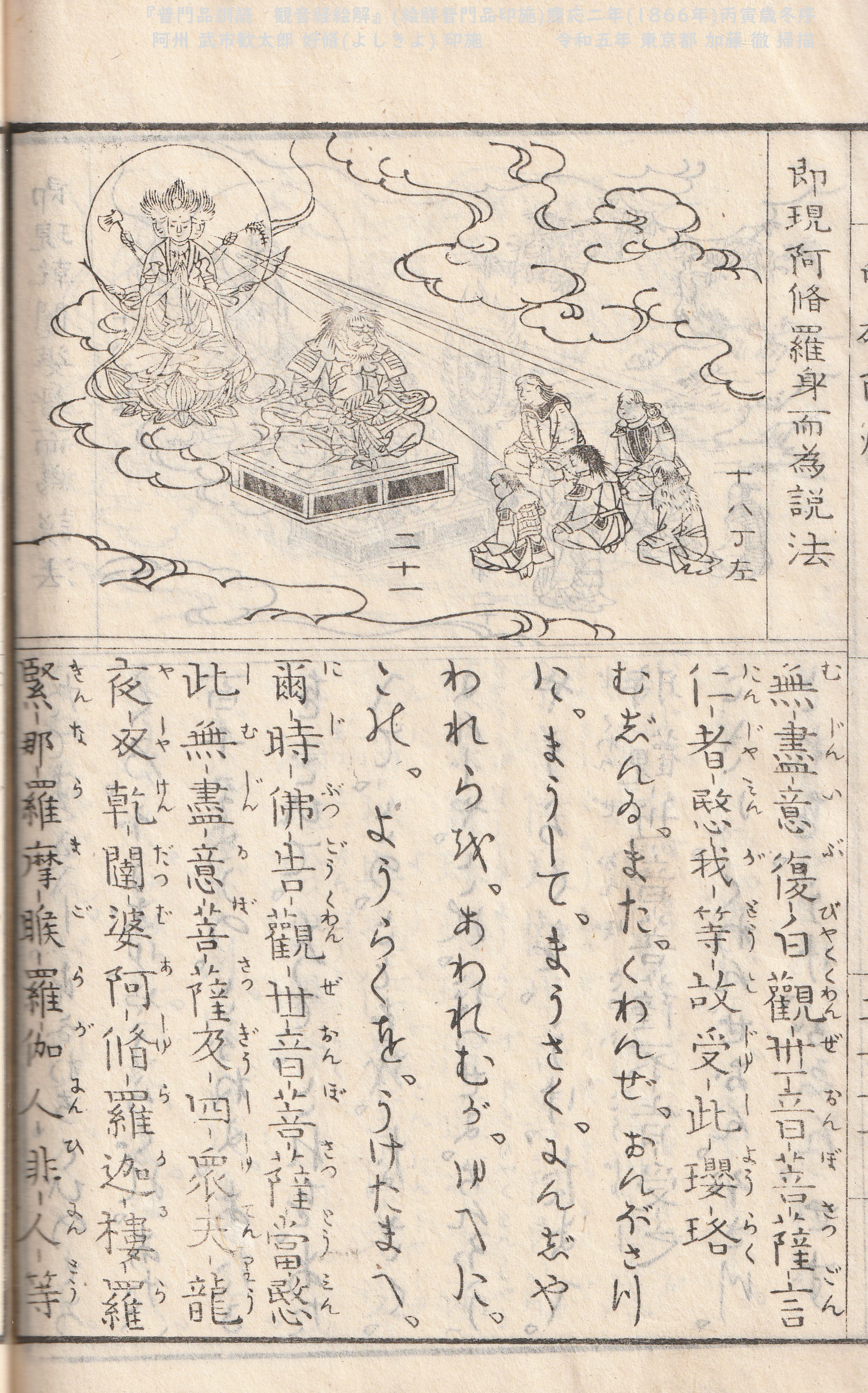
An illustration from an 1866 Japanese book. Asura, who is described as an incarnation of Bodhisattva Kannon in this scene, gives a Buddhism sermon to folks.

The asura realm is one of the realms one can be reborn into within the six realms. Rebirth here is a result of experiencing the fruits of wholesome karma while engaging in unwholesome karma.

The placement of the asura realm in Buddhist cosmology varies among traditions. Sometimes the asura realm is recognized as one of happiness, existing beneath the worlds of the devas and humans. In other schemes, it is viewed as a fourth addition to the usual three evil paths that make up the animal realm, ghost realm and hell realm.

In schools that recognize the desire realm as consisting of five realms, the asura realm tends to be included among the deva realm. In Tibetan Buddhism, the addition of the asuras in the six-world bhavacakra was created in Tibet at the authority of Je Tsongkhapa.

The Ekottara Āgama and the Saddharmasmṛtyupasthāna Sūtra explain that asuras are divided among the realms of ghosts and animals. In the former case, they are powerful, high-ranking asuras reminiscent of gods such as Māra. In the latter case, they are like fearsome beasts that live 84000 yojanas beneath the ocean floor. (Note: The bestial asuras are reminiscent of those gods and creatures of the deep that personify characteristics like chaos and voracity, such as the Leviathan, Fenrir, Typhon, etc.)

== Asurendra ==
The leaders of the asuras are called asurendra (Pāli: Asurinda, Chinese: 阿修羅王; Pinyin: Āxiūluó-wáng; Romaji: Ashura-ō), literally meaning "Asura-lord". There are several of these, as the Asuras are broken into different tribes or factions. Among them are the bow-wielding Dānaveghasa Asuras, and the terrible-faced Kālakañjakas.

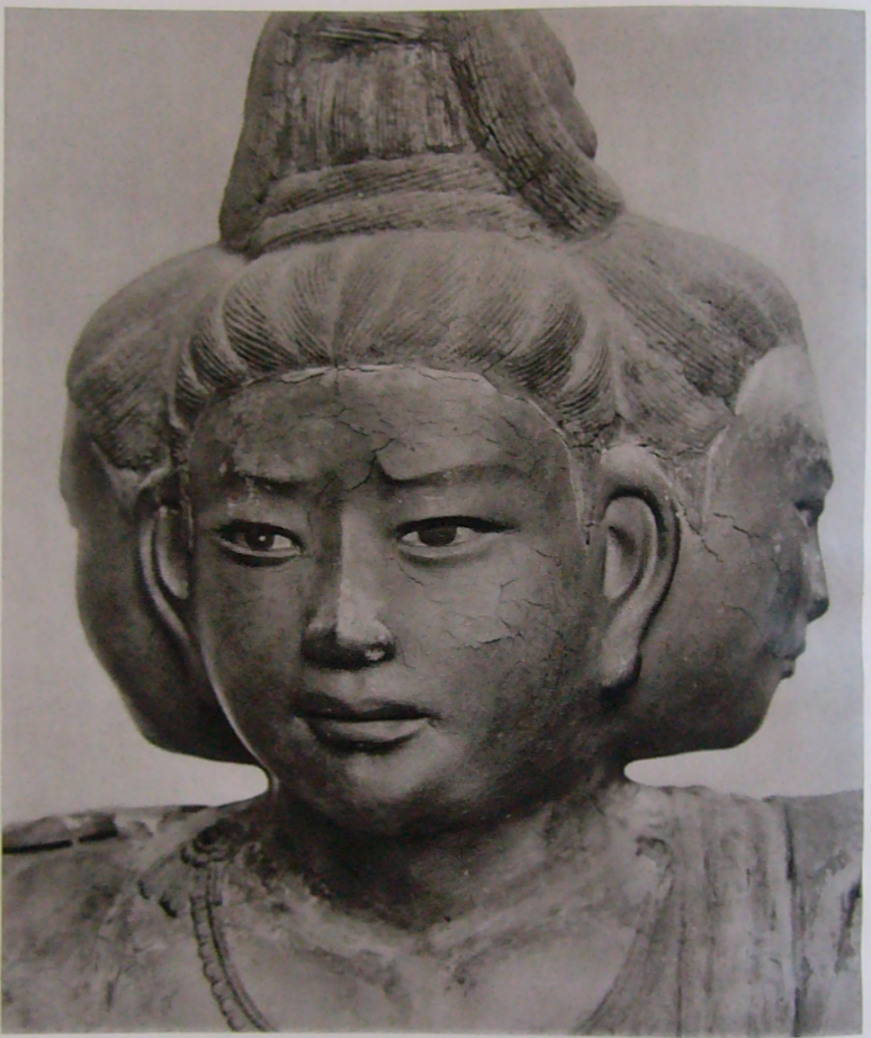
Asura in Kōfuku-ji, Nara, 734, Japanese.

In Pali texts, names that are found include Vepacitti, Rāhu (believed to be synonymous with Verocana), Pahārāda, Sambara, Bali, Sucitti, and Namucī. According to Buddhaghosa, the three primary leaders were Vepacitti, Rāhu and Pahārāda.

Mahayana literature tends to recognize four primary leaders, whose biographies are explained in detail in both the Saddharmasmṛtyupasthāna Sūtra and the Daśabhūmika Sūtra. According to this tradition, these asuras live 84,000 yojanas beneath the ocean floor on the northern side of Mount Sumeru, which are divided into four layers.

- Rāhu
  - Abode: His body is large like Mount Sumeru and he resides in the "Bright Light Castle" (Chinese: 光明城; pinyin: Guāngmíng-chéng; Romaji: Kōmyō-jō) that is 8,000 yojanas in height and width, and 21,000 yojanas beneath the first layer of ocean floor.
  - Karma: In a past life, he was a brahmin who managed to save a stupa from being burned down and vowed that in a future life he would procure a higher status. However, he practiced killing and because he did not cultivate all wholesome karmas, his body was destroyed and he fell into the asura realm.
  - Lifespan: 500 human years is equal to a day and night in Rāhu's realm, which lasts for 5,000 years.
- Bali or Baḍi
  - Bio: His name is Sanskrit for "powerful", which refers to his defeat and binding by Śakra. He is brother of Rāhu and his children are all named "Veroca."
  - Abode: "Double Leisure Castle" (Chinese: 雙遊城; pinyin: Shuāngyóu-chéng; Romaji: Sōyu-jō) 8,000 yojanas in height and width, located in a land called "Moon Garland" (Chinese: 月鬘; pinyin: Yuèmán; Romaji: Getsuman) 21000 yojanas beneath the second layer of the ocean floor.
  - Karma: In a past life, he stole others' property. He held wrong views and gave to those following the path of greed, satisfying them with food and drink. As a result of this, he fell into the asura realm.
  - Lifespan: 600 human years is equal to a day and night in Bali's realm, which lasts for 6,000 years
- Kharakaṇṭha or Kharaskandha
  - Abode: "Gāmbhīra Castle" (Chinese: 鋡毘羅城; pinyin: Hánpíluó-chéng; Romaji: Kanbira-jō), 8,000 yojanas in height and width, located in a land called "Sunava" (Chinese: 修那婆; pinyin: Xiūnàpó; Romaji: Shunaba) 21000 yojanas beneath the third layer of the ocean floor.
  - Karma: In a past life, he gave food to those who broke the precepts. On festival days he often misconducted himself in such sports as wrestling and archery. He also gave impure things. As a result of this, he fell into the asura realm.
  - Lifespan: 700 human years is equal to a day and night in Bali's realm which lasts for 7,000 years.
- Vemacitrin or Vepacitti
  - Bio: After one battle he was made prisoner and bound before the throne of Śakra. He married a gandharva maiden who gave birth to Shachi. Shachi later married Śakra, making Vemacitrin the king of the deva's father-in-law.
  - Abode: "Gāmbhīra Castle" (Chinese: 鋡毘羅城; pinyin: Hánpíluó-chéng; Romaji: Kanbira-jō), 13,000 yojanas in height and width, located in a land called "Unmoving" (Chinese: 不動; pinyin: Bùdòng; Romaji: Fudō) 21000 yojanas beneath the third layer of the ocean floor.
  - Karma: In a past life, he gave to those who kept the precepts but held evil views. Other times he offered protection to trees for his own sake. As a result of this, he fell into the asura realm.

According to the Lotus Sutra, the four leaders of the asuras took refuge in the Buddha after hearing his sermon.

== Mythological objects ==
The asuras were said to be in possession of a war drum called Ālambara, which sounded like the peal of thunder. It was created from the claw of a giant crab named Kulīradaha. It has since been repurposed by Śakra.

Mahayana texts also mention a stringed instrument belonging to the asuras rendered in Chinese as Āxiūluó Qín (Chinese: 阿修羅琴; Pinyin: Āxiūluó Qín), literally meaning "asura harp".

== See also ==
- Asura (Hinduism)
- Ahura, divinities in Zoroastrianism
- Æsir, gods in Old Norse religion
- Asur, a deity in Assyrian mythology
- Asur people
- Jötunn in Norse mythology
- Nephilim in Abrahamic mythology
- Titan (mythology) in Greek mythology
- Buddhist cosmology
- Eight Legions
