= Three poisons =

Innate character flaws described in Buddhism

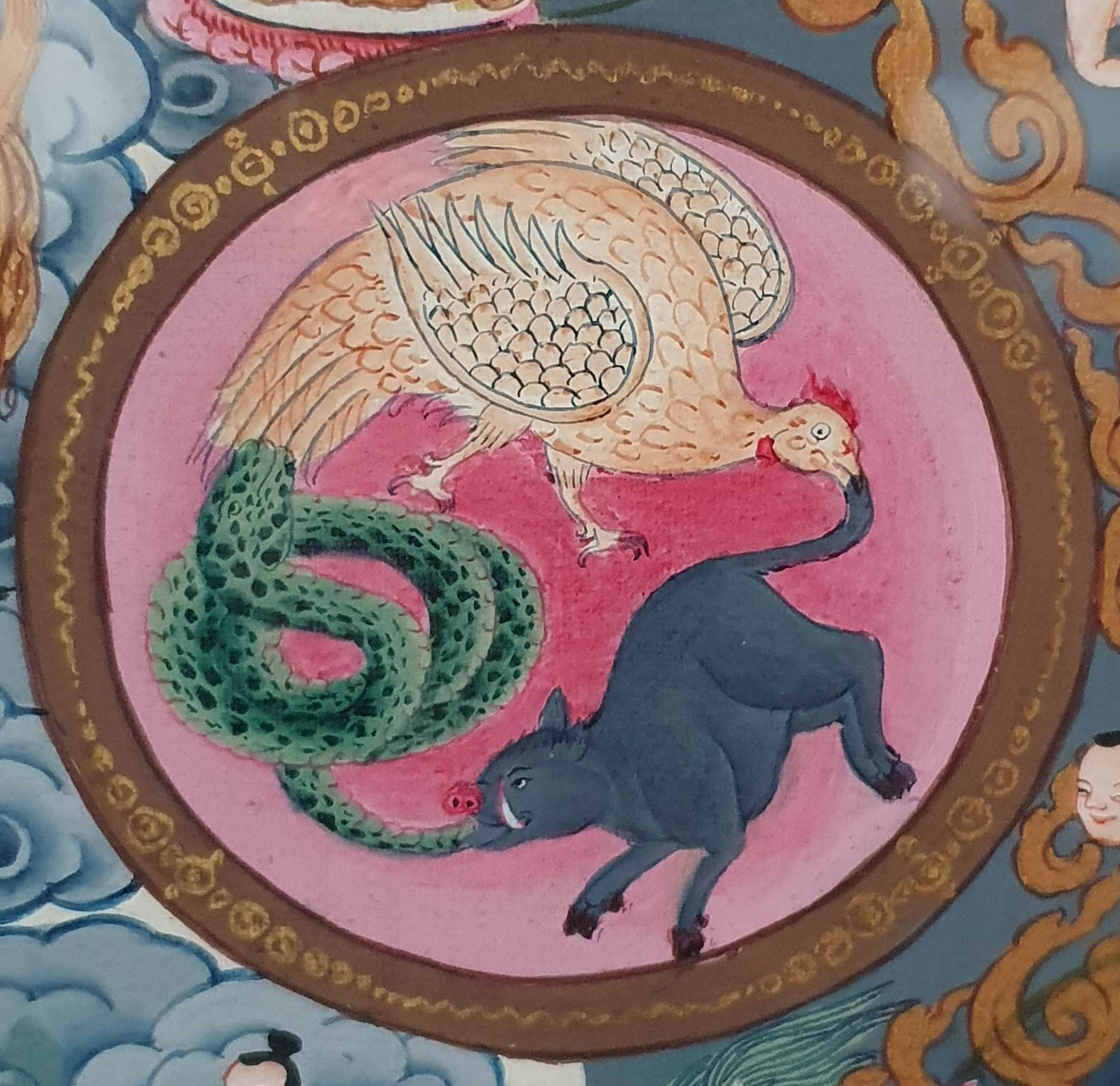
The three poisons are represented in the center of the wheel of life as a pig, a bird, and a snake.

The three poisons (Sanskrit: triviṣa; Tibetan: dug gsum) in the Mahayana tradition or the three unwholesome roots (Sanskrit: akuśala-mūla; Pāli: akusala-mūla) in the Theravada tradition are a Buddhist term that refers to the three root kleshas that lead to all negative states. These three states are delusion, also known as ignorance; greed or sensual attachment; and hatred or aversion. These three poisons are considered to be three afflictions or character flaws that are innate in beings and the root of craving, and so causing suffering and rebirth.

The three poisons are symbolically shown at the center of the Buddhist Bhavachakra artwork, with the rooster, snake, and pig, representing greed, ill-will and delusion respectively.

== Brief description ==
In the Buddhist teachings, the three poisons (of ignorance, attachment, and aversion) are the primary causes that keep sentient beings trapped in samsara. These three poisons are said to be the root of all of the other kleshas. The three poisons are represented in the hub of the wheel of life as a pig, a bird, and a snake (representing ignorance, attachment, and aversion, respectively). As shown in the wheel of life (Sanskrit: bhavacakra), the three poisons lead to the creation of karma, which leads to rebirth in the six realms of samsara.

== Opposite wholesome qualities ==
The three wholesome mental factors that are identified as the opposites of the three poisons are:

- amoha (non-delusion) or paññā (wisdom)
- alobha (non-attachment) or dāna (generosity)
- adveṣa (non-hatred) or mettā (loving-kindness)

The Buddhist path considers these essential for liberation.

== Sanskrit/Pali/Tibetan terms and translations ==
The three kleshas of ignorance, attachment and aversion are referred to as the three poisons (Skt. triviṣa; Tibetan: dug gsum) in the Mahayana tradition and as the three unwholesome roots (Pāli, akusala-mūla; Skt. akuśala-mūla) in the Theravada tradition.

The Sanskrit, Pali, and Tibetan terms for each of the three poisons are as follows:

Poison	Sanskrit	Pali	Tibetan	Alternate English translations	Skt./Pali/Tib. Synonym
Delusion	moha	moha	gti mug	confusion, bewilderment, ignorance	avidyā (Skt.); avijjā (Pāli); ma rigpa (Tib.)
Attachment	rāga	lobha	'dod chags	desire, sensuality, greed	n/a
Aversion	dveṣa	dosa	zhe sdang	anger, hatred, hostility	n/a

In the Mahayana tradition moha is identified as a subcategory of avidya. Whereas avidya is defined as a fundamental ignorance, moha is defined as delusion, confusion and incorrect beliefs. In the Theravada tradition, moha and avidya are equivalent terms, but they are used in different contexts; moha is used when referring to mental factors, and avidya is used when referring to the twelve links.

== Meditation and the three poisons ==
Meditation is regarded in Buddhism as a primary method for developing a calm and concentrated mind to overcome the three poisons. Through meditative introspection, an individual develops self-awareness and insight into their own mind, which helps reduce internal obstacles. However, effective meditation often requires support such as "moral aptitude" and "good friends" (or teachers).

== See also ==
- Buddhist paths to liberation
- Bhavacakra
- Buddhism and psychology
- Dvesha
- Five hindrances
- Kleshas (Buddhism)
- Karma in Buddhism
- Seven deadly sins
- Taṇhā

== Sources ==
- Dalai Lama (1992). The Meaning of Life, translated and edited by Jeffrey Hopkins, Boston: Wisdom.
- Dzongsar Khyentse (2004). Gentle Voice #22, September 2004 Issue.
- Geshe Sonam Rinchen (2006). How Karma Works: The Twelve Links of Dependent Arising, Snow Lion
- Goleman, Daniel (2003). Destructive Emotions: A Scientific Dialogue with the Dalai Lama. Random House.
- Keown, Damien (2004), A Dictionary of Buddhism, Oxford University Press.
- Lamotte, Étienne (translator). The Treatise on the Great Virtue of Wisdom of Nagarjuna. Gampo Abbey.
- Gethin, Rupert (1998), Foundations of Buddhism, Oxford University Press
- Rangjung Yeshe Wiki - Dharma Dictionary. http://rywiki.tsadra.org/index.php/dug_gsum
- Tenzin Wangyal Rinpoche (2011). Awakening the Sacred Body: Tibetan Yogas of Breath and Movement. Hay House.
- Trungram Gyaltrul Rinpoche Sherpa (2004). Gampopa, the Monk and the Yogi : His Life and Teachings. Harvard University.
