= Rebirth in Buddhism =

Teaching in Buddhism

Rebirth in Buddhism refers to the teaching that the actions of a sentient being lead to a new existence after death, in an endless cycle called saṃsāra. This cycle is considered to be dukkha, unsatisfactory and painful. The cycle stops only if Nirvana (liberation) is achieved by insight and the extinguishing of craving. Rebirth is one of the foundational doctrines of Buddhism, along with karma and Nirvana. Rebirth was a key teaching of early Buddhism along with the doctrine of karma (which it shared with early Indian religions like Jainism). In Early Buddhist Sources, the Buddha claims to have knowledge of his many past lives. Rebirth and other concepts of the afterlife have been interpreted in different ways by different Buddhist traditions.

The rebirth doctrine, sometimes referred to as reincarnation or transmigration, asserts that rebirth takes place in one of the six realms of samsara, the realms of gods, demi-gods, humans, the animal realm, the ghost realm and hell realms. (Note: This is discussed in many Suttas of different Nikayas. See, for example, Devaduta Sutta in Majjhima Nikaya (iii.178).) Rebirth, as stated by various Buddhist traditions, is determined by karma, with good realms favored by kusala karma (good or skillful karma), while a rebirth in evil realms is a consequence of akusala karma (bad or unskillful karma). While nirvana is the ultimate goal of Buddhist teaching, much of traditional Buddhist practice has been centered on gaining merit and merit transfer, whereby one gains rebirth in the good realms and avoids rebirth in the evil realms. (Note: This merit gaining may be on the behalf of one's family members.)

The rebirth doctrine has been a subject of scholarly studies within Buddhism since ancient times, particularly in reconciling the rebirth doctrine with its anti-essentialist anatman (not-self) doctrine. The various Buddhist traditions throughout history have disagreed on what it is in a person that is reborn, as well as how quickly the rebirth occurs after each death.

Some Buddhist traditions assert that vijñana (consciousness), though constantly changing, exists as a continuum or stream (santana) and is what undergoes rebirth. Some traditions like Theravada assert that rebirth occurs immediately and that no "thing" (not even consciousness) moves across lives to be reborn (though there is a causal link, like when a seal is imprinted on wax). Other Buddhist traditions such as Tibetan Buddhism posit an interim existence (bardo) between death and rebirth, which may last as long as 49 days. This belief drives Tibetan funerary rituals. A now defunct Buddhist tradition called Pudgalavada asserted there was an inexpressible personal entity (pudgala) which migrates from one life to another.

== Buddhist terminology and doctrine ==
There is no word corresponding exactly to the English terms "rebirth", "metempsychosis", "transmigration" or "reincarnation" in the traditional Buddhist languages of Pāli and Sanskrit. Rebirth is referred to by various terms, representing an essential step in the endless cycle of samsara, terms such as "re-becoming" or "becoming again" (Sanskrit: punarbhava, Pali: punabbhava), re-born (punarjanman), re-death (punarmrityu), or sometimes just "becoming" (Pali/Sanskrit: bhava), while the state one is born into, the individual process of being born or coming into the world in any way, is referred to simply as "birth" (Pali/Sanskrit: jāti). The entire universal process of beings being reborn again and again is called "wandering about" (Pali/Sanskrit: saṃsāra).

Some English-speaking Buddhists prefer the term "rebirth" or "re-becoming" (Sanskrit: punarbhava; Pali: punabbhava) to "reincarnation" as they take the latter to imply an entity (soul) that is reborn. Buddhism denies there is any such soul or self in a living being, but does assert that there is a cycle of transmigration consisting of rebirth and redeath as the fundamental nature of existence.

== Historical context ==
Before the time of the Buddha, many ideas on the nature of existence, birth and death were in vogue. The early layers of the Vedas do not mention the doctrine of Karma and rebirth but mention the belief in an afterlife. According to Sayers, these earliest layers of the Vedic literature show ancestor worship and rites such as sraddha (offering food to the ancestors). The later Vedic texts such as the Aranyakas and the Upanisads show a different soteriology based on reincarnation, they show little concern with ancestor rites, and they begin to philosophically interpret the earlier rituals. The idea of reincarnation and karma have roots in the Upanishads of the late Vedic period, predating the Buddha and the Mahavira. The Sramana schools affirmed the idea of soul, karma and cycle of rebirth. The competing Indian materialist schools denied the idea of soul, karma and rebirth, asserting instead that there is just one life, there is no rebirth, and death marks complete annihilation. From these diverse views, Buddha accepted the premises and concepts related to rebirth, but introduced innovations. According to various Buddhist scriptures, Buddha believed in other worlds,

Since there actually is another world (any world other than the present human one, i.e. different rebirth realms), one who holds the view 'there is no other world' has wrong view...

— Buddha, Majjhima Nikaya i.402, Apannaka Sutta, translated by Peter Harvey

Buddha also asserted that there is karma, which influences the future suffering through the cycle of rebirth, but added that there is a way to end the cycle of karmic rebirths through nirvana. The Buddha introduced the concept that there is no soul (self) tying the cycle of rebirths, in contrast to themes asserted by various Hindu and Jaina traditions, and this central concept in Buddhism is called anattā; Buddha also affirmed the idea that all compounded things are subject to dissolution at death or anicca. The Buddha's detailed conception of the connections between action (karma), rebirth and causality is set out in the twelve links of dependent origination.

== In Early Buddhism ==
There are several references to rebirth in the Early Buddhist texts (henceforth EBTs). Some key suttas which discuss rebirth include Mahakammavibhanga Sutta (Majjhima Nikaya "MN" 136); Upali Sutta (MN 56); Kukkuravatika Sutta (MN 57); Moliyasivaka Sutta (Samyutta Nikaya "SN" 36.21); and Sankha Sutta (SN 42.8).

There are various terms which refer to the rebirth process, such as Āgati-gati, Punarbhava and others. The term Āgati literally means 'coming back, return', while Gati means 'going away' and Punarbhava means 're-becoming'. (Note: Āgati-gati in the sense of rebirth and re-death appears in many places in early Buddhist texts, such as in Samyutta Nikaya III.53, Jataka II.172, Digha Nikaya I. 162, Anguttara III.54-74 and Petavatthu II.9. Punarbhava in the sense of rebirth, similarly appears in many places, such as in Digha II.15, Samyutta I.133 and 4.201, Itivuttaka 62, Sutta-nipata 162, 273, 502, 514 and 733.) Numerous other terms for rebirths are found in the Buddhist scriptures, such as Punagamana, Punavasa, Punanivattati, Abhinibbatti, and words with roots of *jati and *rupa.

According to Damien Keown, the EBTs state that on the night of his awakening, the Buddha attained the ability to recall a vast number of past lives along with numerous details about them. These early scriptures also state that he could remember "as far as ninety one eons" (Majjhima Nikaya i.483). (Note: It is unclear when Majjhima Nikaya was written down. For the historicity of rebirth, samsara in early texts, see Carol Anderson; Ronald Davidson: "While most scholars agree that there was a rough body of sacred literature (disputed)(sic) that a relatively early community (disputed)(sic) maintained and transmitted, we have little confidence that much, if any, of surviving Buddhist scripture is actually the word of the historic Buddha." Richard Gombrich: "I have the greatest difficulty in accepting that the main edifice is not the work of a single genius. By "the main edifice" I mean the collections of the main body of sermons, the four Nikāyas, and of the main body of monastic rules.") An interpretation of these memories is a link to deceased ancestors and their individual lives and memories, with later views interpreting these as personal memories of past lives.

Bhikkhu Sujato notes that there are three main principles of rebirth in early Buddhism:

1. Rebirth is regarded as an ongoing process to be escaped from in the search for liberation.
2. Rebirth is determined by one's own mind, particularly one's ethical choices.
3. The practice of Buddhism aims at ending rebirth.

According to Bhikkhu Anālayo, the Buddhist teaching of Dependent Origination is closely connected with the doctrine of rebirth. One of the 12 elements of Dependent Origination is "birth" (jati), which according to Anālayo refers to the rebirth of living beings. He cites SN 12.2 and its parallel in the Samyukta Āgama "SA" 298 as evidence. SN 12.2 defines "birth" in the context of Dependent Origination as "the birth of the various beings into the various orders of beings, their being born, descent into the womb, production, the manifestation of the aggregates, the obtaining of the sense bases."

The early Buddhist conception of rebirth is one in which consciousness is always dependent on other factors, mainly name and form (nama-rupa) which refers to the physical body and various cognitive elements (such as feeling, perception and volition). Because of this, consciousness (viññana) is seen as supported by the body and its cognitive apparatus and cannot exist without it (and vice versa). However, consciousness can jump from one body to another (this is compared to how a spark from a hot iron can travel through the air in AN 7.52). This process applies to the very moment of conception, which requires a consciousness to enter the womb. This is indicated by Dirgha Agama "DA" 13 and its parallels (DN 15, Madhyama Agama "MA" 97). DA 13 states:

[The Buddha said]: Ananda, in dependence on consciousness there is name and form. What is the meaning of this? If consciousness did not enter the mother's womb, would there be name and form? [Ananda] replied: No.

The same sutra states that if consciousness were to depart from the womb, the fetus could not continue to grow. Drawing on these sutras and others (such as SN 22.8 and SA 1265) Anālayo concludes that "consciousness appears to be what provides the transition from one body to another". He draws attention to the reciprocal conditioning between consciousness and name-and-form described in the Mahānidāna Sutta DN 15:21, which explicitly speaks of consciousness descending into the mother's womb, and when this has successfully happened, it then forms the condition for the continuity of name-and-form. This perspective ensures the type of continuity requires for karma and recollection of past lives without turning consciousness into an entity that exists on its own. At the same time, it also leaves room for discontinuity, after all the body (= form) does not continue and there must be some degree of discontinuity even for the mind, otherwise a small child would not have to learn various things all over again.

The EBTs also seem to indicate that there is an in-between state (antarābhava) between death and rebirth. According to Bhikkhu Sujato, the most explicit passage supporting this can be found in the Kutuhalasāla Sutta, which states that "when a being has laid down this body, but has not yet been reborn in another body, it is fuelled by craving."

Another term which is used to describe what gets reborn in the EBTs is gandhabba ("spirit"). According to the Assalayana Sutta (and its parallel at MA 151), for conception to be successful, a gandhabba must be present (as well as other physiological factors).

According to the EBTs, this rebirth consciousness is not a tabula rasa (blank slate), but contains certain underlying tendencies (anusaya) which in turn "form an object for the establishment of consciousness" (SA 359, SN 13.39). These subliminal inclinations are thus a condition for continued rebirth and also carry imprints from past lives.

According to the EBTs, past life memories can be retrieved through the cultivation of deep meditative states (samadhi). The Buddha himself is depicted as having developed the ability to recollect his past lives as well as to access the past life memories of other conscious beings in texts like the Bhayabherava Sutta (MN 4, the parallel Agama text is at Ekottara Agama 31.1) and the Mahapadana Sutta (DN 14, parallel at DA 1). Another key point affirmed by the EBTs is that the series of past lives stretches so far back into the past that a beginning point cannot be found (see e.g. SN 15.3 and SA 938).

=== Cosmology and liberation ===
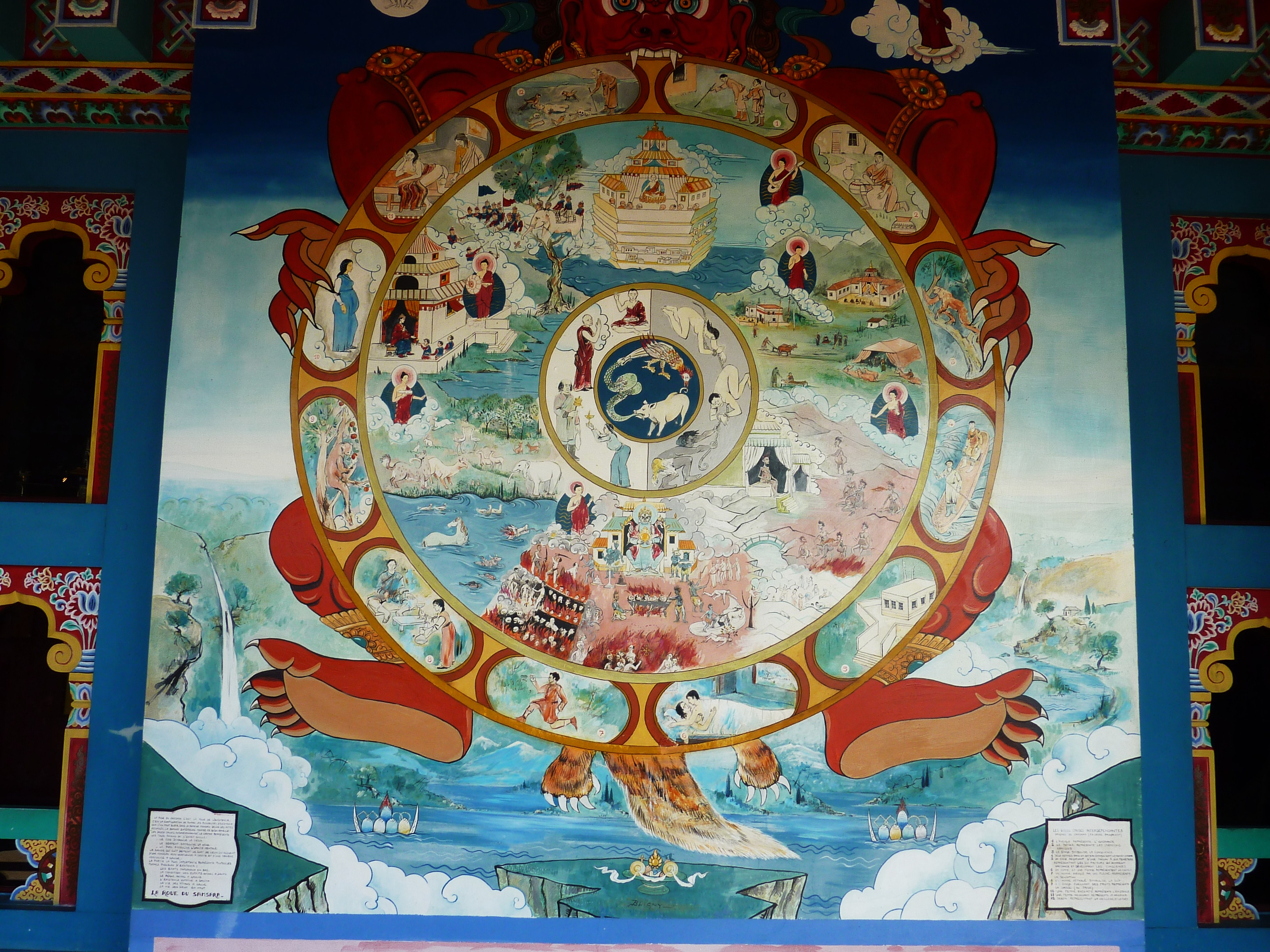
A Bhavachakra ("Wheel of Existence") depicting the six realms of existence in which a sentient being can be reborn into, according to the rebirth doctrine of Buddhism

In traditional Buddhist cosmology the rebirth, also called reincarnation or metempsychosis, can be in any of the six realms of existence. These are called the Gati in cycles of re-becoming, Bhavachakra. The six realms of rebirth include three good realms: Deva (heavenly, god), Asura (demigod), and Manusya (human); and three evil realms: Tiryak (animals), Preta (ghosts), and Naraka (hellish). The realm of rebirth is conditioned by the karma (deeds, intent) of current and previous lives; good karma will yield a happier rebirth into good realms while bad karma is believed to produce rebirth which is more unhappy and evil.

The release from this endless cycle of rebirth is called nirvana (Sanskrit: निर्वाण, nirvāṇa; Pali: nibbāna) in Buddhism. The achievement of nirvana is the ultimate goal of Buddhist teaching. (Note: On samsara, rebirth and redeath: * Paul Williams: "All rebirth is due to karma and is impermanent. Short of attaining enlightenment, in each rebirth one is born and dies, to be reborn elsewhere in accordance with the completely impersonal causal nature of one's own karma. The endless cycle of birth, rebirth, and redeath, is samsara." * Buswell and Lopez on "rebirth": "An English term that does not have an exact correlate in Buddhist languages, rendered instead by a range of technical terms, such as the Sanskrit PUNARJANMAN (lit. 'birth again') and PUNABHAVAN (lit. 're-becoming'), and, less commonly, the related PUNARMRTYU (lit. 'redeath')." See also Perry Schmidt-Leukel (2006) pages 32–34, John J. Makransky (1997) p.27.) (Note: * Graham Harvey: "Siddhartha Gautama found an end to rebirth in this world of suffering. His teachings, known as the dharma in Buddhism, can be summarized in the Four Noble truths." Geoffrey Samuel (2008): "The Four Noble Truths [...] describe the knowledge needed to set out on the path to liberation from rebirth." See also (Note: Donald Lopez, Four Noble Truths Archived 2016-04-22 at the Wayback Machine, Encyclopædia Britannica.) (Note: Thanissaro Bhikkhu, The Truth of Rebirth And Why it Matters for Buddhist Practice Archived 2016-05-22 at the Wayback Machine) * The Theravada tradition holds that insight into these four truths is liberating in itself. This is reflected in the Pali canon. According to Donald Lopez, "The Buddha stated in his first sermon that when he gained absolute and intuitive knowledge of the four truths, he achieved complete enlightenment and freedom from future rebirth." * The Maha-parinibbana Sutta also refers to this liberation. Carol Anderson: "The second passage where the four truths appear in the Vinaya-pitaka is also found in the Mahaparinibbana-sutta (D II 90–91). Here, the Buddha explains that it is by not understanding the four truths that rebirth continues." * On the meaning of moksha as liberation from rebirth, see Patrick Olivelle in the Encyclopædia Britannica. (Note: Patrick Olivelle (2012), Encyclopædia Britannica, Moksha (Indian religions) Archived 2015-04-30 at the Wayback Machine)) However, much of traditional Buddhist practice has been centered on gaining merit and merit transfer, whereby an individual gains rebirth for oneself or one's family members in the good realms, and avoids rebirth in the evil realms.

An important part of the early Buddhist soteriology is the four stages of awakening. With each stage, it was believed that one abandons certain mental defilements or "fetters". Furthermore, each stage of awakening was believed to be associated with being closer to the ending of rebirth in the following manner:

- The Sotāpanna (Stream-enterer) – Still has up to seven rebirths left
- Sakadāgāmi (Once Returner) – Will only return for one more human rebirth
- Anāgāmi – Will only return once more to a heavenly realm
- Arahant – Has cut off rebirth completely, will not be reborn

=== Right View and Rebirth ===
According to the early Buddhist texts, accepting the truth of rebirth (glossed as the view that "there is this world & the next world" in suttas like MN 117) is part of right view, the first element of the noble eight-fold path. While some scholars like Tilmann Vetter and Akira Hirakawa have questioned whether the Buddha saw rebirth as important, Johannes Bronkhorst argues that these views are based on scant evidence from the EBTs. He further writes that "in so far as the texts allow us to reach an answer...the Buddha did believe in rebirth."

As noted by Anālayo, a standard definition of wrong view in the EBTs "explicitly covers the denial of rebirth and the fruition of karma". The denial of rebirth is rejected as an "annihilationist" view in the Brahmajala Sutta (DN 1, Chinese parallel at DA 21, a Tibetan parallel also exists). The Samaññaphala Sutta (parallel at DA 27) also critiques the view of a school of ancient Indian materialism called Carvaka (which rejected rebirth and held that "all are destroyed at death"). According to this Sutta, to hold this view while living in a time when the Buddha's teachings are available is equivalent to being born dumb and dull.

However, Anālayo argues that since there are different definitions of right view in the early texts, this "leaves open the possibility that someone may engage in practices related to the Buddhist path to liberation without necessarily pledging faith in rebirth. It does not leave open the possibility of denying rebirth outright, however, since that would amount to holding wrong view". Because of this, Anālayo writes that the question of rebirth may simply be set aside without going as far as to deny rebirth and affirm annihilation.

An advice given in various EBTs is not to waste time speculating about what one might have been in the past and what they will be in the future. Such advice can be found in the Sabbasava Sutta (MN 2, with a parallel at MA 10). In contrast to this, various early texts regularly recommend the direct recollection of one's own past lives as one of the three higher knowledges which correspond to the realizations attained by the Buddha on the night of his awakening. According to Anālayo, there is a major difference between direct access to our past lives through mental training (which is encouraged) and theoretical speculation (which is not).

Some early discourses also depict various Buddhist monks who seriously misunderstood the nature of rebirth. In one discourse, the Mahatanhasankhaya sutta (MN 38, MA 201), a monk comes to the conclusion that it is this very same consciousness that will be reborn (as opposed to a dependently originated process). In another discourse, the Mahapunnama sutta (MN 109, SA 58), a monk misapplies the doctrine of not-self to argue that there is nobody who will be affected by the fruition of karma.

== Later Developments and Theories ==
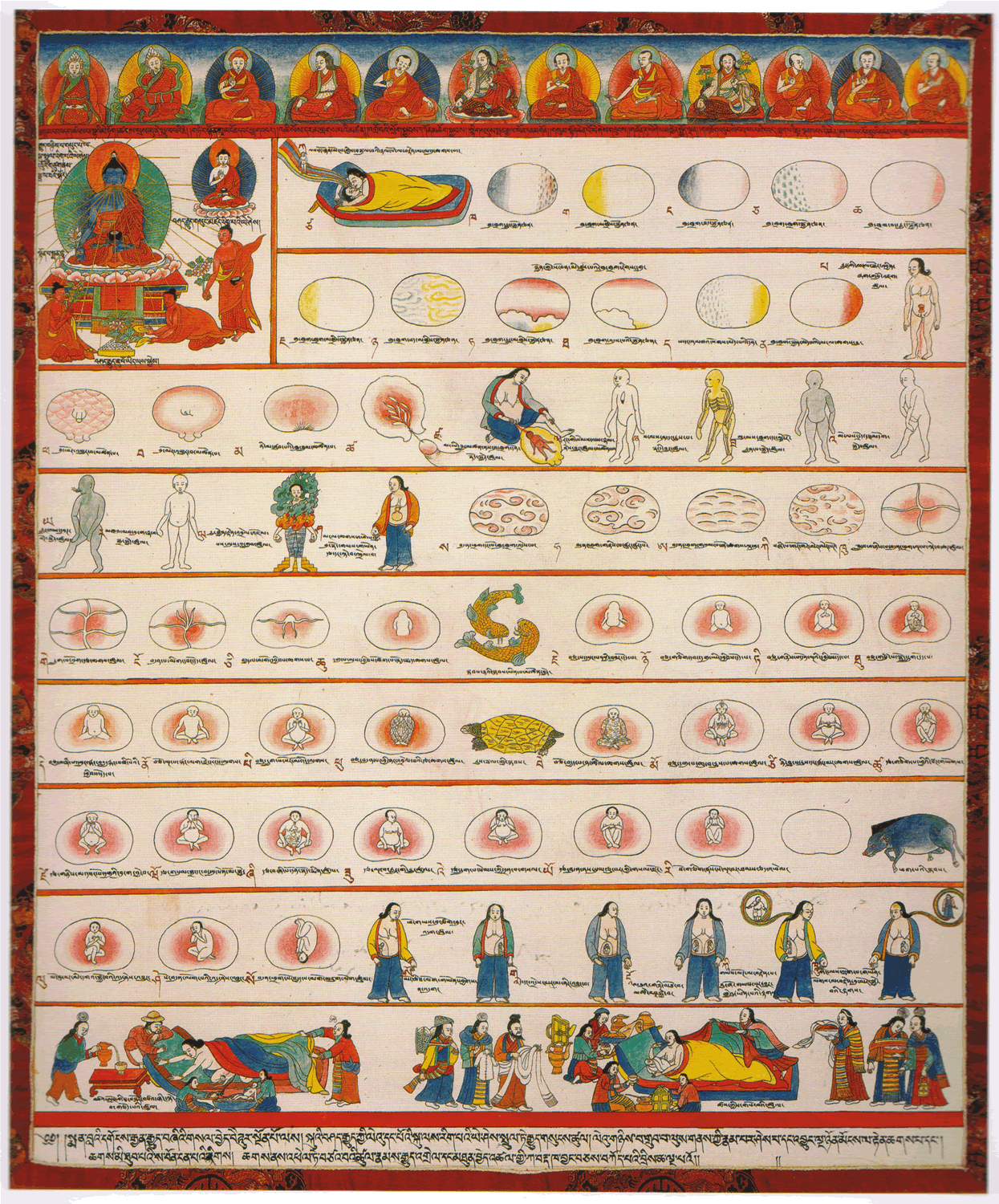
A traditional Tibetan illustration of conception and the growth of the fetus, from the "Blue Beryl" medical treatise by Sangye Gyatso (c. 1720). Note the rebirth consciousness entering the womb during conception (first illustration, top left).

While the vast majority of Buddhists accept some notion of rebirth, they differ in their theories about the rebirth mechanism and precisely how events unfold after the moment of death. Already at the time of the Buddha there was much speculation about how to explain how rebirth occurs and how it relates to the doctrines of not-self and impermanence.

After the death of the Buddha, the various Buddhist schools which arose debated numerous aspects of rebirth, seeking to provide a more systematic explanation of the rebirth process. Important topics included the existence of the intermediate state, the exact nature of what undergoes rebirth, the relationship between rebirth and not-self, and how karma affects rebirth.

Both the Sarvāstivāda-Vaibhāṣika and the Theravāda tradition interpreted the teaching of the 12 factors (nidana) of dependent origination by using a three life model (the previous life, the present life and the future life). However, their Abhidharma works also state that the 12 factors of dependent origination can be understood as active in the present moment.

=== Karma and What Is Reborn ===
An important question which was debated by Indian Buddhist thinkers was the question of what exactly gets reborn, and how this is different from the Indian concept of an attā (ātman, unchanging self), which Buddhism rejects. The early Buddhist texts sometimes speak of an "evolving consciousness" (Pali: samvattanika viññana, M.1.256) or a "stream of consciousness" (Pali: viññana sotam, D.3.105) as that which transmigrates. However, according to Bruce Matthews, "there is no single major systematic exposition on this subject" in the Pali Canon.

Some Buddhist scholars such as Buddhaghosa, held that the lack of an unchanging self (atman) does not mean that there is a lack of continuity in rebirth, since there is still a causal link between lives. The process of rebirth across different realms of existence was compared to how a flame is transferred from one candle to another.

Various Indian Buddhist schools like the Sautrantika, Mahasamghika and the Mahasisaka held that the karmic link between lives could be explained by how karmic effects arose out of "seeds" which were deposited in a mental substratum. The Sautrantika Elder Srilata defended the theory of a "subsidiary element" (anudhatu or *purvanudhatu) which corresponds to the seed theory. The Sautrantika school held this was a "transmigrating substratum of consciousness". It argued that each personal action "perfumes" the individual stream of consciousness and leads to the planting of a seed that would later germinate as a good or bad karmic result. This allowed them to explain what underwent the process of rebirth.

The Sarvāstivāda-Vaibhāṣika school on the other hand did not make use of the seed theory, since they held an eternalist theory of time, which held that phenomena (dharmas) in the past, present and future exist. Because of this, they argued that after an action was done by a person, it still continued to exist, and to be in a state of "possession" (prāpti) vis a vis the mindstream (santana) of the person who performed the action. According to Vaibhāṣikas, it was this which guaranteed the capacity of past karma to produce an effect long after it had been performed.

The seed theory was defended by the influential Buddhist philosopher Vasubandhu in his Abhidharmakosha. It is also present in the Viniscayasamgrahani of the Yogacarabhumi. The Sarvastivada Abhidharma master Saṃghabhadra states that the seed theory was referred to by different names including: subsidiary elements (anudhatu), impressions (vasana); capability (samarthya), non-disappearance (avipranasa), or accumulation (upacaya).

The seed theory was adopted and further developed by the Yogacara school into their doctrine of the "container consciousness" (alaya-vijñana), which is a subliminal and constantly changing stream of consciousness that stores the seeds and undergoes rebirth. Asanga's Mahāyānasaṃgraha equated the alaya-vijñana with similar teachings found in other Buddhist schools which indicates that the idea of a rebirth consciousness was widespread. He states that this is the same idea which is called "root-consciousness" (mula-vijñana) by the Mahasamghika schools and what the Sthavira schools call the bhavaṅga.

According to Lobsang Dargyay, the Prāsaṇgika branch of the Madhyamaka school (which is exemplified by the philosopher Chandrakirti), attempted to refute every concept for a support or a storehouse of karmic information (including the alaya-vijñana). Instead, some Prāsaṇgika philosophers argue that a karmic action results in a potential which will ripen later. This potential is not a thing and does not need a support. However, other Madhyamaka thinkers (which are classified as "Svatantrikas" by Tibetans scholars), generally adopted the Sautrantika concept of tendencies stored in the stream of consciousness.

The Theravāda school's doctrine of the bhavaṅga (Pali, "ground of becoming", "condition for existence") is another theory that was used to explain rebirth. It is seen as a mental process which conditions the next mental process at the moment of death and rebirth (though it does not actually travel in between lives, see below).

The Pudgalavada school of early Buddhism accepted the core premise of Buddhism that there is no ātman, but asserted that there is a "personal entity" (pudgala, puggala) that retains karmic merit and undergoes rebirth. This personal entity was held to be neither different nor identical to the five aggregates (skandhas). This concept was attacked by Theravada Buddhists in the early 1st millennium CE. The personal entity concept was rejected by the mid-1st millennium CE Pali scholar Buddhaghosa, who attempted to explain rebirth mechanism with "rebirth-linking consciousness" (patisandhi-citta). It was also criticized by northern Buddhist philosophers like Vasubandhu.

=== Intermediate Existence ===
Another topic which gave rise to much debate among Indian Buddhists was the idea of the intermediate existence (antarabhāva). According to Andre Bareau, the Indian Buddhist schools were split on this issue. While the Sarvāstivāda, Sautrantika, Pudgalavada, Pūrvaśaila and late Mahīśāsaka accepted this doctrine, the Mahāsāṃghika, early Mahīśāsaka, Theravāda, Vibhajyavāda and the Śāriputrābhidharma (possibly Dharmaguptaka) rejected it in favor of an immediate leap of the consciousness from one body to the next.

In the Abhidharmakosha, Vasubandhu defends the theory of the intermediate existence. He argues that each intermediate being is made up of the five aggregates, that it arises in the place of death and carries the "configuration of the future being." Furthermore, according to Vasubandhu, this conscious intermediate being becomes aroused on seeing their future parents joined in intercourse and it becomes envious of one of the parents. Because of this desire and hatred, it becomes attached to the womb where it conditions the first moment of "birth existence" (pratisamdhi).

In Tibetan Buddhism, the intermediate existence (Tibetan: bardo) concept developed elaborate descriptions of numerous visions experienced during the process of dying, including visions of peaceful and wrathful deities. These ideas led to various maps for navigating the intermediate existence which are discussed in texts like the Bardo Thodol.

In contrast to this, the Theravāda scholar Buddhaghosa argued that rebirth occurs in one instant as part of a process called "rebirth-linking" (patisandhi). According to Buddhaghosa, at death, the sense faculties dissolve one by one until only consciousness is left. The very last moment of consciousness at death (cuti viññana) conditions the very first instant of consciousness of the next life, the patisandhi viññana, which occurs at the time of conception. The relationship is compared to that between a seal and wax. While they are not the same entity, the wax impression is conditioned by the seal. Therefore, in the classic Theravāda view, nothing actually transmigrates.

In spite of the rejection of the intermediate state by such an influential figure, some modern Theravāda scholars (such as Balangoda Ananda Maitreya) have defended the idea of an intermediate state. It is also a very common belief among monks and laypersons in the Theravāda world (where it is commonly referred to as the gandhabba or antarabhāva).

== Buddhist Arguments for Rebirth ==
=== Empirical Arguments ===
Ancient Buddhists as well as some moderns cite the reports of the Buddha and his disciples of having gained direct knowledge into their own past lives as well as those of other beings through a kind of parapsychological ability or extrasensory perception (termed abhiñña). Traditional Buddhist philosophers like Dharmakīrti have defended the concept of special yogic perception (yogi-pratyakṣa) which is able to empirically verify the truth of rebirth. Some modern Buddhists authors like K.N. Jayatilleke also argue that the Buddha's main argument in favor of rebirth was based on empirical grounds, and that this included the idea that extra-sensory perception (Pali: atikkanta-manusaka) can provide a validation for rebirth.

Modern Buddhists such as Bhikkhu Anālayo and Jayatilleke have also argued that rebirth may be empirically verifiable and have pointed to certain parapsychological phenomena as possible evidence, mainly near-death experiences (NDEs), past-life regression, reincarnation research and xenoglossy. Both Anālayo and B. Alan Wallace point to the work of the American Psychiatrist Ian Stevenson as providing possible evidence of rebirth. This is not just a recent phenomenon. According to Anālayo, ancient Chinese Buddhists also pointed to anomalous phenomena such as NDEs to argue for the truth of rebirth. Furthermore, according to Roger R. Jackson, the Indian Buddhist philosopher Śāntarakṣita (725–788) argues in his Tattvasaṅgraha that newborn children exhibit a wide range of complex desires, emotions and mental states that could not exist without the force of past habit, and thus they must be based on the habits acquired in a past life.

Wallace also notes that several modern Buddhist figures, such as Pa Auk Sayadaw and Geshe Gedun Lodro have also written about how to train the mind to access past life memories. The Burmese monk Pa Auk Sayadaw is known for teaching such methods and some of his western students like Shaila Catherine have written about this and their experiences in practicing it.

B. Alan Wallace argues that first person introspection is a valid means of knowledge about the mind (when that introspection is well trained by meditation) and has been used by numerous contemplatives throughout history. He writes that a well trained mind, "which may be likened to an inwardly focused telescope," should be able to access "a subtle, individual mind stream that carries on from one lifetime to another." Wallace proposes that a research project using well trained meditators could access information from past lives in an accurate manner and these could then be checked by independent third person observers.

=== Metaphysical arguments ===
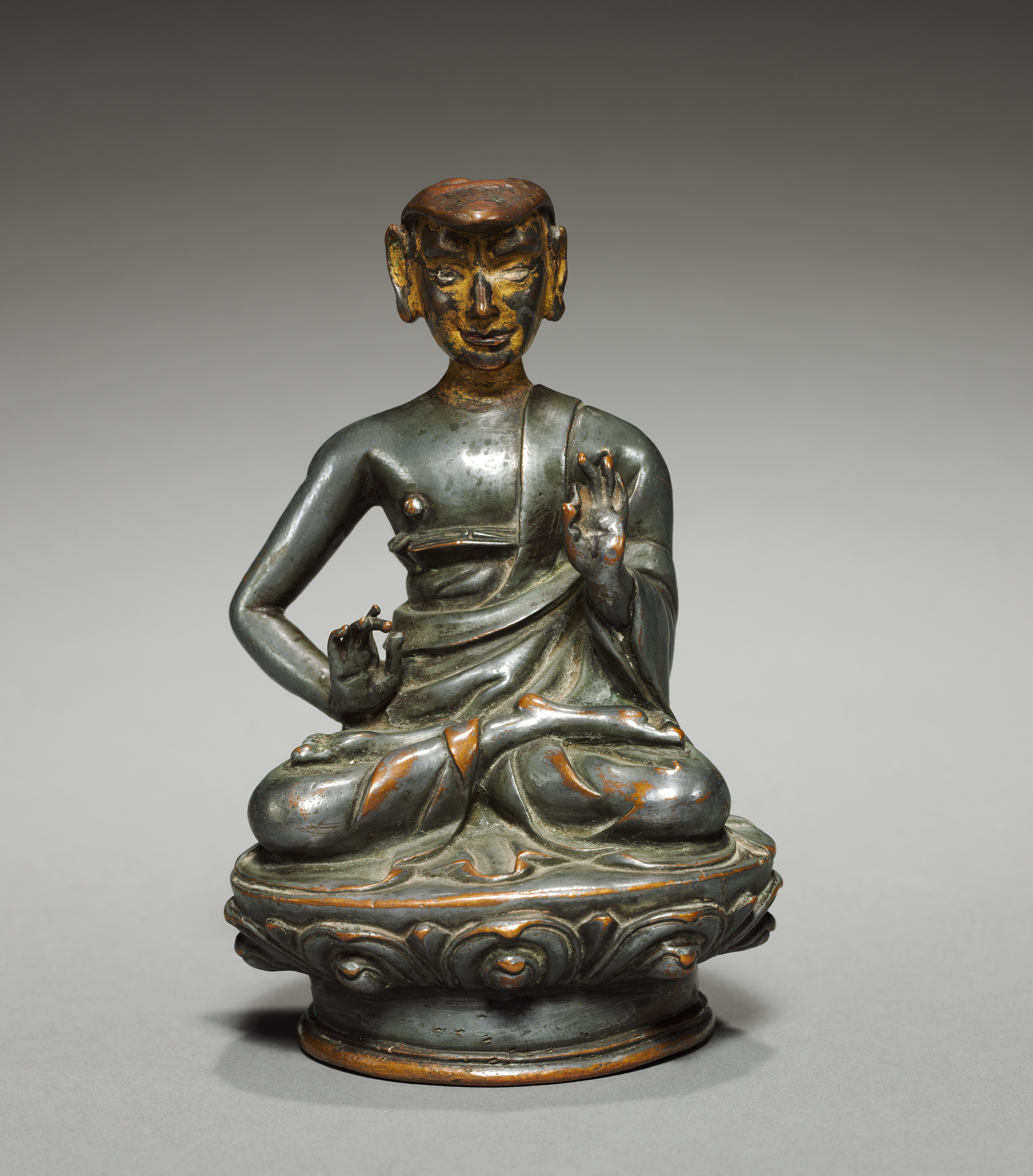
The Indian Buddhist philosopher Dharmakīrti (fl. c. 6th or 7th century) outlined one of the most influential arguments for rebirth.

Besides defending the status of the Buddha as an epistemically authoritative or reliable person (pramāṇa puruṣa), Indian Buddhist philosophers like Dignaga (c. 480–540 CE) and Dharmakīrti (fl. c. 6th or 7th century), as well as later commentators on their works, also put forth philosophical arguments in favor of rebirth and especially directed against the reductionist materialist philosophy of the Carvaka school.

In his Pramanavarttika, Dharmakīrti defends rebirth by initially focusing on refuting the materialist doctrine of the Carvaka school, which held that the support (asraya) for cognition is the body and that when the body is destroyed, cognition is destroyed. Modern Buddhists who argue in favor of rebirth like B. Alan Wallace often begin by mounting similar arguments against materialism and physicalism, pointing to the current philosophical debate on the "hard problem of consciousness" and arguing that conscious properties cannot be reduced to physical properties. Indeed, according to Wallace "the metaphysical views of materialism are in fundamental conflict with the Buddhist worldview regarding the nature of the mind"

According to Richard P. Hayes, Dharmakīrti denied that mental events were a mere byproduct of the body, instead holding that "both mental events and physical events can be seen as effects of the same set of causal conditions." For Dharmakīrti, all events are dependent on multiple causes, and they must be preceded by an "antecedent causal condition" of the same class. This means that all mental events must have a previous mental event as part of its causal nexus (presumably stretching back before one's birth). According to Hayes, Dharmakīrti holds therefore that "both physical factors and nonphysical factors play a role in the formation of mental events", if not there would be no difference between sentient beings and inanimate matter.

Philosopher Evan Thompson outlines Dharmakīrti's main point as follows: "matter and consciousness have totally different natures; an effect must be of the same nature as its cause; hence consciousness cannot arise from or be produced by matter (though material things can condition or influence consciousness)." Thompson further notes that for Dharmakīrti, the nature of matter is that it is obstructive, it resists other instances of matter, while the nature of consciousness is altogether different since it is capable of including diverse objects within itself at the same time without any of them obstructing the other. Furthermore, phenomenal consciousness is able to illuminate or cognize objects (as well as itself, i.e. it is self-reflexive) and has intentionality, while matter does not.

Eli Franco mentions that for Dharmakīrti, the position that cognition "can arise from the body alone, independent of their similar causes" at the moment of birth is irrational. That is, if the mind is not being conditioned by a previous cognitive event, then it cannot arise from inert matter. Dharmakīrti also argues that mental events can causally condition physical events, and thus there is no reason to privilege matter as being primary. According to Martin Willson, this kind of argument is the most commonly used in the Tibetan philosophical tradition to establish the truth of rebirth and in its most simple form can be put as follows:

With respect to the knowing (consciousness or mind) of an ordinary being just born:

it is preceded by earlier knowing; because it is knowing.

Willson notes that this relies on two further assumptions, the first is that any mental continuum must have previous causes, the second is that materialism is false and that mind cannot emerge solely from matter (emergentism).

According to Jacob Andrew Lucas, the strength of Dharmakīrti's argument lies on its two key premises:

1. Consciousness, or the mental continuum, has characteristics that are distinct from physical characteristics.
2. The substantial cause for any event is a prior event with the same character (i.e. it is a homogeneous cause).

However, as Lucas notes, we should not take Dharmakīrti to be arguing in favor of a strict mind-body dualism, since in all systems of Buddhist thought, the mind and body are deeply interconnected and dependent on each other. Dharmakīrti 's point is merely that consciousness cannot arise from physical factors alone, which does not entail that consciousness is totally separate from physical factors.

Jacob Andrew Lucas provides a modern formulation of an argument for rebirth which draws on the work of Galen Strawson. Strawson argues against emergence as well as against proto-experiential qualities and argues for a form of constitutive panpsychism. Lucas rejects constitutive panpsychism as a live option for a Buddhist due to various issues including the "combination problem" and because it supports the idea that the conscious subject collapses into micro-experiences when the body dies. Lucas then proceeds to argue for an unbroken stream of consciousness or an indivisible cluster of conscious experience "that can neither arise from nor collapse into rudimentary factors that are devoid of the distinctive characteristics of consciousness."

Theravada Abhidhamma makes a similar argument to Dharmakīrti's. According to the Abhidhamma teacher Nina van Gorkom, physical and mental events (dhammas) both depend on each other and on previous events of the same category (i.e. mental events must also be conditioned by previous mental events, and so on). In Abhidhamma, the mental event (citta) which arises at the first moment of life is called the rebirth consciousness or patisandhi-citta. According to van Gorkom, "there isn't any citta which arises without conditions, the patisandhi-citta must also have conditions. The patisandhi-citta is the first citta of a new life and thus its cause can only be in the past."

=== Pragmatic arguments and wager theories ===
Various Buddhists and interpreters of the Buddhist texts such as David Kalupahana and Etienne Lamotte, have argued that the Buddha is a kind of pragmatist regarding truth, and that he saw truths as important only when they were soteriologically useful. Thus, the Buddhist position on rebirth could be defended on pragmatic grounds instead of empirical or logical grounds. Some modern Buddhists have taken this position.

The American monk Thanissaro Bhikkhu has argued for the acceptance of the Buddhist idea of rebirth as a type of pragmatic wager argument (Pali: apaṇṇaka, "safe bet" or "guarantee"). Thanissaro argues that "the Buddha stated that it's a safe wager to assume that actions bear results that can affect not only this lifetime but also lifetimes after this than it is to assume the opposite." Thanissaro cites Majjhima Nikaya 60 (Apaṇṇaka sutta) where the Buddha says that if there is an afterlife, those who perform bad actions have "made a bad throw twice" (because they are harmed in this world and in the next) while those who perform good actions will not, and thus he calls his teaching a "safe-bet teaching". This ancient wager argument is similar in structure to modern wager arguments like Pascal's Wager and the Atheist's Wager.

According to Thanissaro Bhikkhu:

The Buddha's main pragmatic argument is that if one accepted his teachings, one would be likely to pay careful attention to one's actions, so as to do no harm. This in and of itself is a worthy activity regardless of whether the rest of the path was true. When applying this argument to the issue of rebirth and karmic results, the Buddha sometimes coupled it with a second pragmatic argument that resembles Pascal's wager: If one practices the Dhamma, one leads a blameless life in the here-and-now. Even if the afterlife and karmic results do not exist, one has not lost the wager, for the blamelessness of one's life is a reward in and of itself. If there is an afterlife with karmic results, then one has won a double reward: the blamelessness of one's life here and now, and the good rewards of one's actions in the afterlife. These two pragmatic arguments form the central message of this sutta.

Sri Lankan Buddhist philosopher K.N. Jayatilleke writes that the Buddha's "wager argument" in MN 60 is that a rational person (viññu puriso) would reason as follows:

	If p is true	If p is not true
We wager p [atthikavada, rebirth based on moral actions is true]	We are happy in the next life	We are praised by the wise in this life
We wager not-p [natthikavada, it is false]	We are unhappy in the next life	We are condemned by the wise in this life

The Kālāma Sutta also contains a similar wager argument towards rebirth, called the "four assurances" or "four consolations". These four assurances are as follows:

1. "If there is another world, and if there is the fruit and result of good and bad deeds, it is possible that with the breakup of the body, after death, I will be reborn in a good destination, in a heavenly world."
2. "If there is no other world, and there is no fruit and result of good and bad deeds, still right here, in this very life, I maintain myself in happiness, without enmity and ill will, free of trouble."
3. "Suppose evil comes to one who does evil. Then, when I have no evil intentions toward anyone, how can suffering afflict me, since I do no evil deed?"
4. "Suppose evil does not come to one who does evil. Then right here I see myself purified in both respects."

=== Moral arguments ===
According to Thanissaro Bhikkhu, part of the reason the Buddha recommended having conviction in the truth of rebirth was that his teaching on the nature of human action would be incomplete without reference to rebirth. Thanissaro argues that the distinction that the Buddha draws between skillful and unskillful actions is based on the consequences of these actions, and that this provides a strong motivation to do good as long as rebirth holds. This is because actions can sometimes take many lifetimes to yield their results (and thus bad persons do not always experience bad consequences in one lifetime as can be seen in SN 42.13 and MN 136) and therefore only a multi-life perspective can lead to "a complete and convincing case that unskillful actions should always be avoided, and skillful ones always developed."

Thanissaro further writes that:

If you assume that your actions have results, and those results will reverberate through many lifetimes, it's easier to stick to your principles not to lie, kill, or steal even under severe duress. And even though you may not know whether these assumptions are true, you cannot plan an action without implicitly wagering on the issue. This is why simply stating, "I don't know," is not an adequate response to the questions of rebirth and the efficacy of karma. The attitude behind it may be honest on one level, but it's dishonest in thinking that this is all that needs to be said, for it ignores the fact that you have to make assumptions about the possible results of your actions every time you act.

B. Alan Wallace writes that nihilistic and materialistic views which reject rebirth "undermine any sense of moral responsibility, and this is bound to have a profoundly detrimental effect on societies that adopt such beliefs." He further argues:

If we embrace a materialistic worldview, we will naturally seek satisfaction and fulfillment by turning our attention to the outside world, looking for novel sensory and intellectual experiences as well as new material acquisitions. Likewise, when we focus on decreasing our level of suffering and pain, once again our orientation will be outward, looking for scientific and technological breakthroughs to relieve our suffering. Human desire for ever-greater happiness seems to be insatiable, and a materialistic worldview strongly supports materialistic values and a way of life centered on the never-ending quest of consumerism... A materialistic outlook that focuses our attention on the bounties of the external physical world simultaneously blinds us to the inner resources of the human heart and mind. If all our efforts go toward the alleviation of suffering and realization of happiness by external means, the inner ways that we might pursue the good life will be unexplored. A materialistic worldview provides no rationale for making a commitment to ethics or spiritual practice of any kind. Material values and consumerism are naturally aligned with materialism, which reduces meditation to a means for making a materialistic way of life more bearable.

According to Alexander Berzin, acceptance of rebirth also has positive moral consequences, particularly in our practice of the Buddhist path. Berzin writes that an understanding of rebirth allows one to better cultivate compassion and loving-kindness towards all beings, since it allows us to see how in past lives, we have been related to all beings and how they have been our mothers (and vice versa). Likewise, we have also been many different types of beings in the past (male, female, animals, numerous nationalities etc). According to Berzin, this reflection allows us to better relate to other sentient beings.

== Modern naturalistic interpretations ==
In the 1940s, J. G. Jennings interpreted the teaching of rebirth in a less than literal sense. Believing that the doctrine of anatta (not-self) is incompatible with the view that the actions of one individual can have repercussions for the same individual in a future life, Jennings argued that the doctrine of actual transmigration was an "Indian dogma" that was not part of the original teachings of the Buddha. However, rebirth could instead be understood as the recurrence of our selfish desires which could repeat themselves "in endless succeeding generations". In this interpretation, our actions do have consequences beyond our present lives, but these are "collective not individual."

The British Buddhist thinker Stephen Batchelor has recently posited a similar view on the topic:

Regardless of what we believe, our actions will reverberate beyond our deaths. Irrespective of our personal survival, the legacy of our thoughts, words, and deeds will continue through the impressions we leave behind in the lives of those we have influenced or touched in any way.

The Thai modernist Buddhist monk Buddhadāsa (1906–1993) also had a rationalistic or psychological interpretation of rebirth. He argued that since there is no substantial entity or soul (atman), "there is no one born, there is no one who dies and is reborn. Therefore, the whole question of rebirth is quite foolish and has nothing to do with Buddhism…in the sphere of the Buddhist teachings there is no question of rebirth or reincarnation." However, Buddhadāsa did not completely reject the rebirth doctrine, he only saw the idea that there is something that gets reborn into a future womb as "trivial". Instead of this 'literal' view, he interpreted the true meaning of rebirth as the re-arising of the sense of self or "I" or "me", a kind of "self-centredness" which is "a mental event arising out of ignorance, craving, and clinging." According to Buddhadāsa, this is what "rebirth" truly means on the ultimate level (paramattha) of discourse.

== Comparison with rebirth doctrines in Hinduism and Jainism ==
The rebirth theories in different traditions within Hinduism rely on their foundational assumption that soul exists (Atman, attā), in contrast to Buddhist assumption that there is no soul. Hindu traditions consider soul to be the unchanging eternal essence of a living being, and in many of its theistic and non-theistic traditions the soul asserted to be identical with Brahman, the ultimate reality. Thus while both Buddhism and Hinduism accept the karma and rebirth doctrine, and both focus on ethics in this life as well as liberation from rebirth and suffering as the ultimate spiritual pursuit, they have a very different view on whether a self or soul exists, which impacts the details of their respective rebirth theories.

Rebirth and karma doctrine in Jainism differ from those in Buddhism, even though both are non-theistic Sramana traditions. Jainism, in contrast to Buddhism, accepts the foundational assumption that soul exists (Jiva) and is involved in the rebirth mechanism. Further, Jainism considers that the rebirth has a start, that rebirth and redeath cycle is a part of a progression of a soul, karmic dust particles emanate from ethical or unethical intent and actions, these karmic particles stick to the soul which determines the next birth. Jainism, further asserts that some souls can never achieve liberation, that ethical living such as Ahimsa (non-violence) and asceticism are means to liberation for those who can attain liberation, and that liberated souls reach the eternal siddha (enlightened state) that ends their rebirth cycles. Jainism, like Buddhism, also believes in realms of birth (Note: Jainism posits that there are four realms, in contrast to six of Buddhism; the Jaina realms are heavenly deities, human, non-human living beings (animal, plants), and hellish beings. Within the human realms, Jainism asserts that rebirth lineage and gender depends on karma in the past lives.) and is symbolized by its emblematic Swastika sign, with ethical and moral theories of its lay practices focussing on obtaining good rebirth.

== See also ==
- Alter ego
- Reincarnation
- Saṃsāra (Jainism)
- Dissociative identity Disorder
- Metempsychosis
- Four Noble Truths
- Index of Buddhism-related articles
- Secular Buddhism
- Six realms
- The unanswered questions
- Tulpa

== Commentaries ==
- Bhikkhu Anālayo, Rebirth in Early Buddhism and Current Research, Somerville, MA, USA: Wisdom Publications, 2018. ISBN 978-1-614-29446-7
- Steven Collins, Selfless Persons: Imagery and Thought in Theravada Buddhism, Cambridge, 1982. ISBN 0-521-39726-X
- Peter Harvey, The Selfless Mind: Personality, Consciousness and Nirvana in Early Buddhism, Curzon, 1995. ISBN 0-7007-0338-1
- Geshe Kelsang Gyatso, Living Meaningfully, Dying Joyfully: The Profound Practice of Transference of Consciousness, Tharpa, 1999. ISBN 81-7822-058-X
- Glenn H. Mullin, Death and Dying: The Tibetan Tradition, Arkana, 1986. ISBN 0-14-019013-9.
- Mullin, Glenn, H. (1998). Living in the Face of Death: The Tibetan Tradition. 2008 reprint: Snow Lion Publications, Ithaca, New York. ISBN 978-1-55939-310-2.
- Vicki MacKenzie, Reborn in the West, HarperCollins, 1997. ISBN 0-7225-3443-4
- Tom Shroder, Old Souls: Scientific Search for Proof of Past Lives, Simon and Schuster, 2001. ISBN 0-684-85193-8
- Francis Story, Rebirth as Doctrine and Experience: Essays and Case Studies, Buddhist Publication Society, 1975. ISBN 955-24-0176-3
- Robert A.F. Thurman (trans.), The Tibetan Book of the Dead: Liberation Through Understanding in the Between, HarperCollins, 1998. ISBN 1-85538-412-4
- Martin Willson, Rebirth and the Western Buddhist, Wisdom Publications, 1987. ISBN 0-86171-215-3
- Nagapriya, Exploring Karma and Rebirth, Windhorse Publications, Birmingham 2004. ISBN 1-899579-61-3
