= Six Paths =

Concept in Buddhist cosmology

Chinese name
- Chinese: 六道
Transcriptions
Standard Mandarin
- Hanyu Pinyin: liùdào
Yue: Cantonese
- Jyutping: luk6dou6

Alternative Chinese name
- Chinese: 六趣
Transcriptions
Standard Mandarin
- Hanyu Pinyin: liùqù

Vietnamese name
- Vietnamese alphabet: Sáu cõi luân hồi Sáu đường Lục đạo
- Hán-Nôm: 𦒹𡎝輪迴 𦒹塘 六道

Korean name
- Hangul: 육도
- Hanja: 六道
Transcriptions
- Revised Romanization: Yukdo

Japanese name
- Kanji: 六道
- Kana: ろくどう
Transcriptions
- Romanization: rokudō

Filipino name
- Tagalog: Sadgati (ᜐᜀᜄᜀᜆᜒ)

Sanskrit name
- Sanskrit: षड्गति (ṣaḍgati)

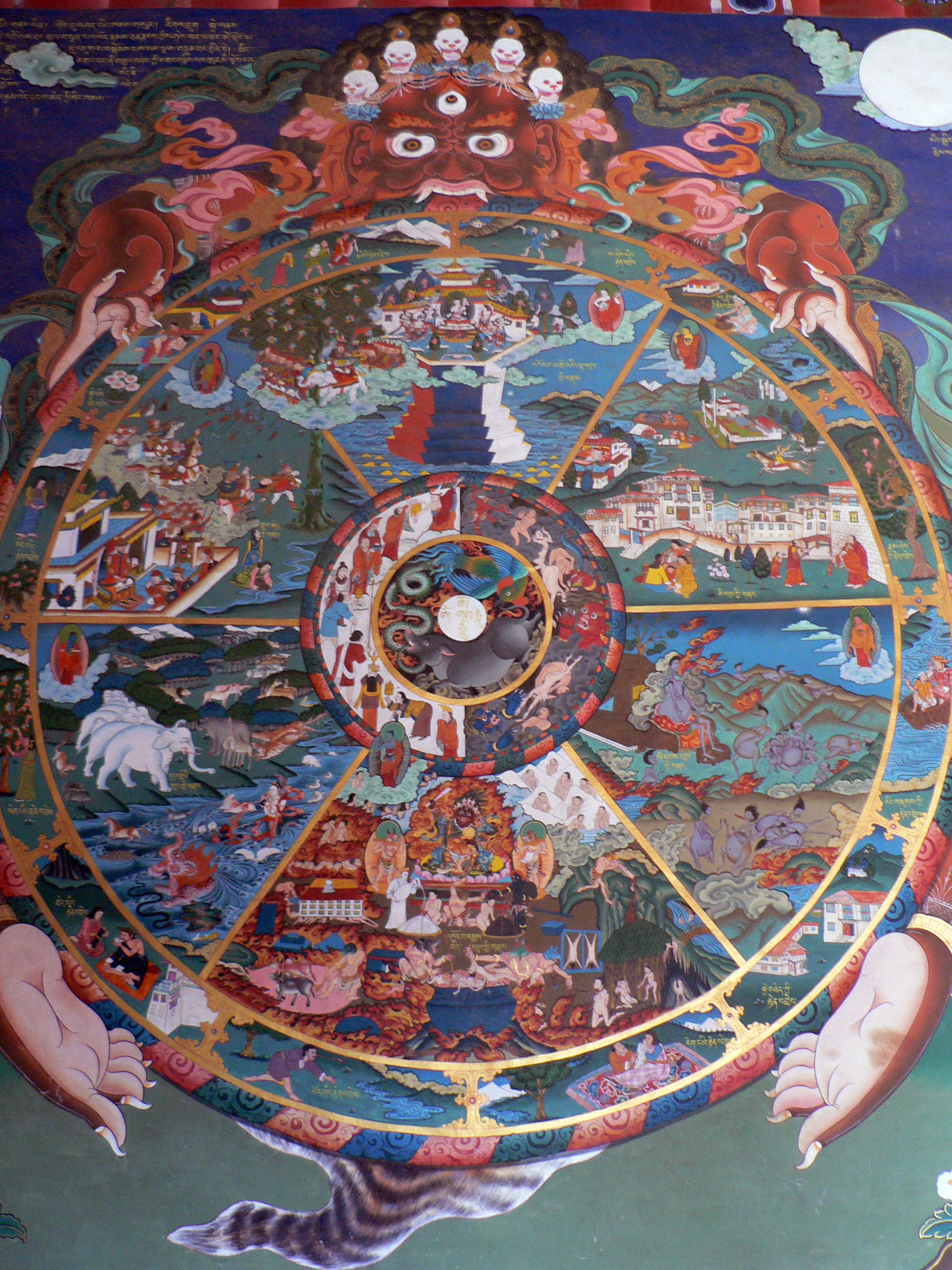
Traditional Tibetan thangka showing the bhavacakra and six realms of saṃsāra in Buddhist cosmology.

The Six Paths in Buddhist cosmology are the six worlds where sentient beings are reincarnated based on their karma, which is linked to their actions in previous lives. These paths are depicted in the Bhavacakra ("wheel of existence"). The six paths are:

1. the world of gods or celestial beings (deva)
2. the world of human beings (manushya)
3. the world of warlike demigods ( partly human partly divine )
4. the world of animals (tiryagyoni)
5. the world of hungry ghosts (preta)
6. the world of Hell (naraka)

The first three paths are known as "the three benevolent destinies" (kuśalagati), where beings experience varying degrees of virtue, pleasure, and pain. The last three paths are referred to as the three unbenevolent destinies (akuśalagati), where beings lack virtue and suffer predominantly. Typically, we as human beings only perceive the animals around us. The first Buddhist texts mention only five paths without distinguishing between the paths of deva and asura. Moreover not all texts acknowledge the world of asura. In Japan, the monk Genshin even inexplicably places the path of humans below that of the asuras.

The elements forming karma are constituted in bodily, oral or mental volitional acts. The chain of transmigration due to the Three Poisons (hatred, greed, ignorance), of which ignorance (avidyā) of the ultimate truth (Sanskrit: paramārtha; Chinese: zhēndì 真谛) or the true law (Sanskrit: saddharma, सद्धर्म, correct law; Chinese: miàofǎ, 妙法, marvelous law) is generally presented as the source of reincarnation in the three non-benevolent destinies.

Early Buddhist descriptions divided the psychocosmic universe into three "worlds": the kāma-loka ("world of desire"), rūpa-loka ("world of form") and arūpa-loka (""world of non-form"). The kāma-loka dealt with the daily psychological possibilities of humans and was divided into five above mentioned worlds with the exception of the asura realm.

== Concept Timeline ==
In response to the question since when beings wander within samsara (i.e. the Six Paths), the Buddha answered that the starting point could not be identified nor understood. One conclusion that is certain, is that we have wandered already for aeons, however, when the Buddha was asked how long an aeon is, he gave a smile.

== Interpretation ==
=== Realms as States of Consciousness ===
Early texts are not explicit about how these realms are to be interpreted; however, they can be seen as states of consciousness. The realm of deva symbolising the purer and spiritual stages of consciousness, humans relating to the abilities of reason and logic, animals and hunger ghosts especially can be seen as an image of instinct and Naraka would represent the accumulated dukkha from past actions. Humans can therefore easily move through different stages throughout their lives.

This can also be understood through the nature of karma. Karma is considered an action with an intention behind it. This intention, produced by the mentality, can either be wholesome or unwholesome. These mental states then translate to a karma that is accumulated and connected to a certain realm.

==== Karmic Workings of the States of Consciousness ====
The ten unwholesome actions (kamma-patha) that produce bad karma are the three bodily actions (murder, stealing, sexual misconduct), four vocal actions (lying, divisive speech, hurtful speech, frivolous speech) and three mental actions (avarice, ill-will, wrong views). The mental states that promote these actions are: strong greed, hatred and delusion.

The ten wholesome actions that are inspired by generosity (dana), ethical conduct (sila) and meditation (bhavana). Mental states that support these actions are: desirelessness, friendliness and wisdom.

=== Interpretation of the Saddharmasmṛtyupasthānasūtra ===
The Saddharmasmṛtyupasthānasūtra ("Sutra of the Remembrance of the True Law") interprets the different realms, stating that the deva world is a human ideal of pleasure based upon ignorance which is transitory and decays. This causes the deva eventual suffering. Being situated in the human world exposes one to disease, impurities, exposure to impermanence and a non-self (anātman). The animal realm is a place for those who have tormented animals and will receive the same treatment. The asura are in this realm as well and wage war against the deva. The preta realm is created by greed and ignorance of humans. It is the place for those who have refused offerings and are controlled by avarice.

The hells (naraka) represent the dark labyrinths of the mind entrenched by ignorance and self-deceit. The grotesque hell imagery is used in order to initiate the individual on the path of enlightenment and to identify within the hell of their own mind the faceless past existences that are in constant suffering.

=== Deva Realm ===
It is stated in Buddhist tradition that, while it might be tempting to aspire to a rebirth within the world of gods or celestial beings, the deva are so full of joy in this realm that they are unable to understand the teaching about the permanent dukkha in samsara. Furthermore, even a deva, having consumed all the good karma which they had attained within the pleasurable existence in this realm, can be reborn in Naraka.

=== Nirvana ===
In regards to Nirvana the Six Paths do not constitute a hierarchy that leads to it. Gethin argues that it can only be achieved through the human and the deva realm.

== See also ==
- Naraka (Buddhism)
- Bhavacakra
