= Saṃsāra in Buddhism =

Cycle of repeated birth, mundane existence and dying again

Translations of saṃsāra (Buddhism)
- English: cycle of existence, endless rebirth, wheel of dharma, beginningless time
- Sanskrit: saṃsāra (Dev: संसार)
- Pali: saṃsāra (Dev: संसार)
- Bengali: সংসার (sôngsar)
- Burmese: သံသရာ (MLCTS: θàɰ̃ðajà)
- Chinese: 生死, 輪迴, 流轉 (Pinyin: shēngsǐ, lúnhuí, liúzhuǎn)
- Japanese: 輪廻 (Rōmaji: rinne)
- Khmer: សង្សារ, វដ្ដសង្សារ (UNGEGN: sângsar, vôddâsângsar)
- Korean: 윤회, 생사유전 Yunhoi, Saengsayujeon
- Lao: ວັດຕະສົງສານ
- Mongolian: ᠰᠠᠨᠰᠠᠷ᠂ ᠬᠣᠷᠸᠠ᠂ ᠣᠷᠴᠢᠯᠠᠩ; Сансар, Хорвоо, Орчлон; SASM/GNC: sansar, horwa, orcilang
- Sinhala: සංසාරය (sansāra)
- Tagalog: Samsala
- Tibetan: འཁོར་བ་ (khor ba)
- Thai: วัฏสงสาร (RTGS: wát sǒng sǎan)
- Vietnamese: Luân hồi

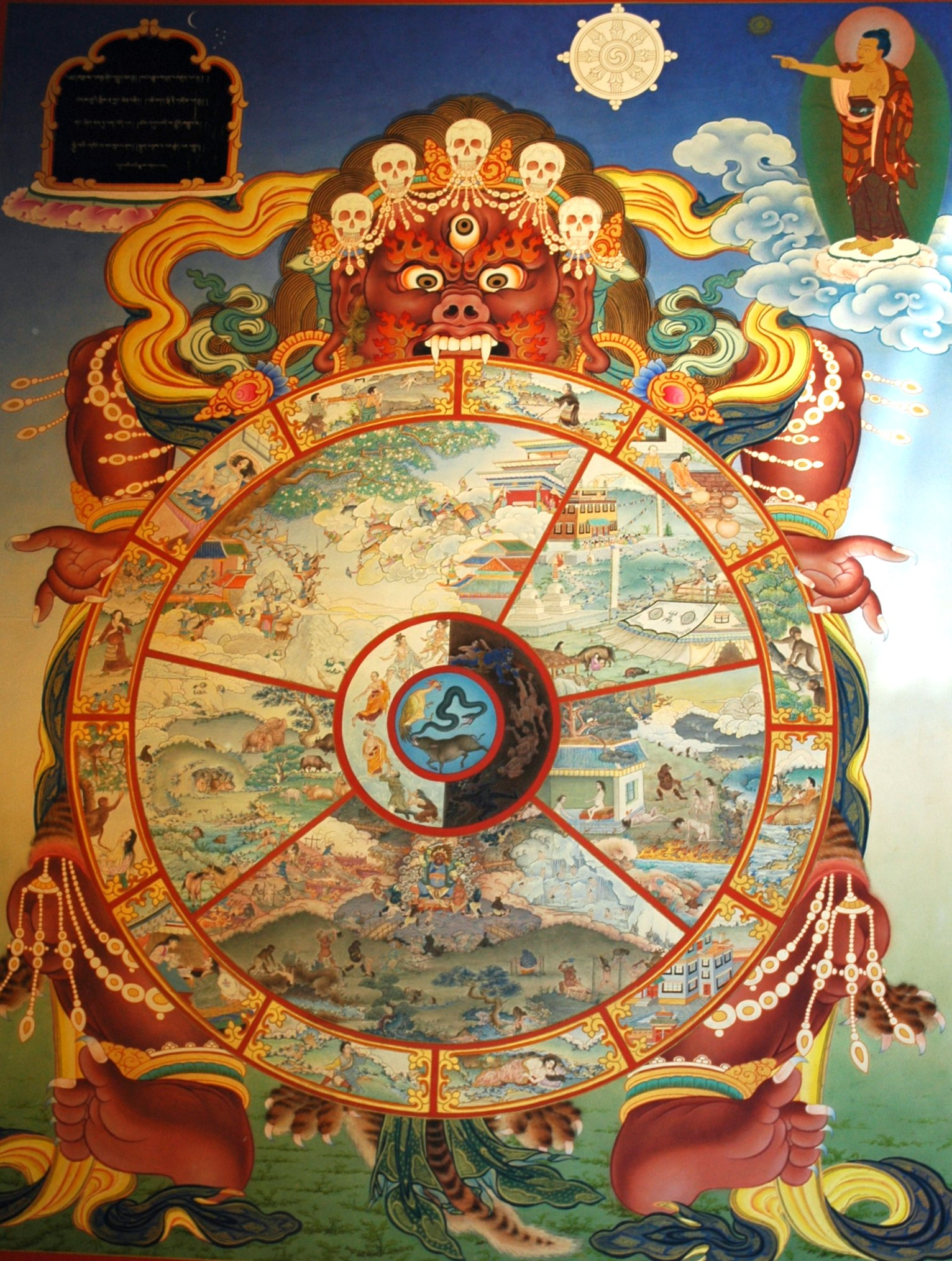
A thangka showing the bhavacakra with the ancient five cyclic realms of saṃsāra in Buddhist cosmology. Medieval and contemporary texts typically describe six realms of reincarnation.

Saṃsāra in Buddhism (in Sanskrit (संसार) and Pali) is the beginningless cycle of repeated birth, mundane existence and dying again. Samsara is considered to be suffering (Skt. duḥkha; P. dukkha), or generally unsatisfactory and painful. It is perpetuated by desire and ignorance (Skt. avidyā; P. avijjā), and the resulting karma and sensuousness.

Rebirths occur in six realms of existence, namely three good realms (heavenly, demi-god, human) and three evil realms (animal, ghosts, hell). (Note: Earlier Buddhist texts refer to five realms rather than six realms; when described as five realms, the god realm and demi-god realm constitute a single realm.) Saṃsāra ends when a being attains nirvāṇa, which is the extinction of desire and acquisition of true insight into the nature of reality as impermanent and non-self. (Note: Ending samsara: Kevin Trainor: "Buddhist doctrine holds that until they realize nirvana, beings are bound to undergo rebirth and redeath due to their having acted out of ignorance and desire, thereby producing the seeds of karma".; Conze: "Nirvana is the raison d'être of Buddhism, and its ultimate justification.")

== Characteristics ==
In Buddhism, saṃsāra is the beginningless and endless cycle of life, death, and rebirth characterized by suffering. Passages from the Samyutta Nikaya propose that this process is beginningless, fueled by the ignorance and craving of beings. This unending transmigration across the six realms (Skt. gati, lit. "paths") lacks a particular direction or purpose. (Note: Samsara is the continual repetitive cycle of rebirth within the six realms of existence: Damien Keown: "Although Buddhist doctrine holds that neither the beginning of the process of cyclic rebirth nor its end can ever be known with certainty, it is clear that the number of times a person may be reborn is almost infinite. This process of repeated rebirth is known as saṃsāra or 'endless wandering', a term suggesting continuous movement like the flow of a river. All living creatures are part of this cyclic movement and will continue to be reborn until they attain nirvana."; Ajahn Sucitto: "This continued movement is [...] what is meant by samsāra, the wandering on. According to the Buddha, this process doesn't even stop with death—it's like the habit transfers almost genetically to a new consciousness and body.") Samsara is characterized by suffering (Skt. duḥkha; P. dukkha), (Note: Samsara is characterized by dukkha: Chogyam Trungpa: "Samsara arises out of ignorance and is characterized by suffering."; Rupert Gethin: "This precisely is the nature of saṃsāra: wandering from life to life with no particular direction or purpose.") and relates to the Four Noble Truths in Buddhism, as dukkha is the essence of Samsara. Every rebirth is temporary and impermanent. In each rebirth one is born and dies, to be reborn elsewhere in accordance with one's own karma. It is perpetuated by one's ignorance (Skt. and P. avidyā), particularly ignorance regarding impermanence (Skt. anityā; P. anicca) and no-self (Skt. anātman; P. anatta), which leads to craving. (Note: Ignorance and craving: John Bowker: "In Buddhism, samsāra is the cycle of continuing appearances through the domains of existence (gati), but with no Self (anātman, [ātman means the enduring, immortal self]) being reborn: there is only the continuity of consequence, governed by karma." (Note: John Bowker. The Concise Oxford Dictionary of World Religions. 1997. Encyclopedia.com. 24 November 2012 "Saṃsāra." Archived 2010-10-23 at the Wayback Machine; John Bowker (2014). God: A Very Short Introduction. Oxford University Press. pp. 84–86. ISBN 978-0-19-870895-7. Archived from the original on 2017-01-22.); Chogyam Trungpa states: "Cyclic existence [is] the continual repetitive cycle of birth, death, and bardo that arises from ordinary beings' grasping and fixating on a self and experiences. (...) Samsara arises out of ignorance and is characterized by suffering." Chogyam Trungpa's description includes a reference to the bardo, or intermediate state, that is emphasized in the Tibetan tradition.; Huston Smith and Philip Novak state: "The Buddha taught that beings, confused as they are by ignorant desires and fears, are caught in a vicious cycle called samsara, freedom from which—nirvana—was the highest human end.") Samsara continues until liberation is attained by means of insight and nirvana, the extinguishment of desires and the gaining of true insight into impermanence and non-self reality. Outside of a Buddhist context, similar notions of cyclic existence date back to 800 BCE.

=== Mechanism ===
Saṃsāra in Buddhism asserts that there is no permanently unchanging entity that undergoes the endless cycles of rebirth, and this distinguishes it from the Hindu and Jain views of saṃsāra. This is known as no-self (Skt. anātman; P. anatta).

Early Buddhist texts suggest that the Buddha faced a difficulty in explaining what is reborn and how rebirth occurs, after he invented the concept that there is "no self." Later Buddhist scholars, such as the fifth-century Pali scholar-monk Buddhaghosa, suggested that the lack of a self or soul does not mean lack of continuity; and the rebirth across different realms of birth – such as heavenly, human, animal, hellish and others – occurs in the same way that a flame is transferred from one candle to another. Buddhaghosa attempted to explain rebirth mechanism with "rebirth-linking consciousness" (patisandhi).

Buddhist traditions diverge in their understanding of the exact process of rebirth. The Early Buddhist Schools were divided on whether or not there existed an intermediate state (Skt. antarābhava) between lives. These doctrinal camps filtered into contemporary Buddhism with conservative Theravada Buddhists asserting that rebirth is immediate while the Mahāyāna schools generally agree that there is an intermediate state of up to forty-nine days before the being is reborn.

In the framework of the Two Truths as capitulated by the third-century Mahayanist scholar-monk Nagarjuna, saṃsāra and nirvāṇa are identical in the ultimate truth.

== Realms of rebirth ==
Buddhist cosmology typically identifies six realms of rebirth and existence: gods, demi-gods, humans, animals, hungry ghosts and hells. Earlier Buddhist texts refer to five realms rather than six realms; when described as five realms, the god realm and demi-god realm constitute a single realm.

The six realms are typically divided into three higher realms (good, fortunate) and three lower realms (evil, unfortunate), with all realms of rebirth being Independent completely of reality and nature in all forms, with the deva realm being the "ultimate" reality. The three higher realms are the realms of the gods, humans and demi-gods; the three lower realms are the realms of the animals, hungry ghosts and hell beings. The six realms are organized into thirty-one levels in East Asian literature. Buddhist texts describe these realms as follows:

- God realm (deva): the realm of the gods is the most pleasant among the six realms, and can be subdivided into many planes of existence. A rebirth in this heavenly realm stems from accumulating wholesome karma. A deva does not need to work, and is able to enjoy in the heavenly realm all pleasures found on earth. However, the pleasures of this realm lead to attachment (Upādāna), lack of spiritual pursuits and therefore no nirvana. The vast majority of Buddhist lay people have historically pursued Buddhist rituals and practices motivated with rebirth into deva realm. (Note: Other scholars note that better rebirth, not nirvana, has been the primary focus of a vast majority of lay Buddhists. This they attempt through merit accumulation and good karma.) The deva realm in Buddhist practice in Southeast and East Asia include gods found in Hindu traditions such as Indra and Brahma, and concepts in Hindu cosmology such as Mount Meru.
- Human realm (manuṣya): Buddhism asserts that one is reborn in this realm with vastly different physical endowments and moral natures because of a being's past karma. A rebirth in this realm is considered as fortunate because it offers an opportunity to attain nirvana and end the Saṃsāra cycle.
- Demi-god realm (asuras): the third realm of existence in Buddhism. Demi-gods are notable for their anger and some supernatural powers. They fight with the gods, or trouble the humans through illnesses and natural disasters. They accumulate karma, and are reborn.
- Animal realm (tiryag): is the state of existence of a being as an animal. This realm is traditionally thought to be similar to a hellish realm, because animals are believed in Buddhist texts to be driven by impulse and instinct; they prey on each other and suffer. Some Buddhist texts assert that plants belong to this realm, with primitive consciousness.

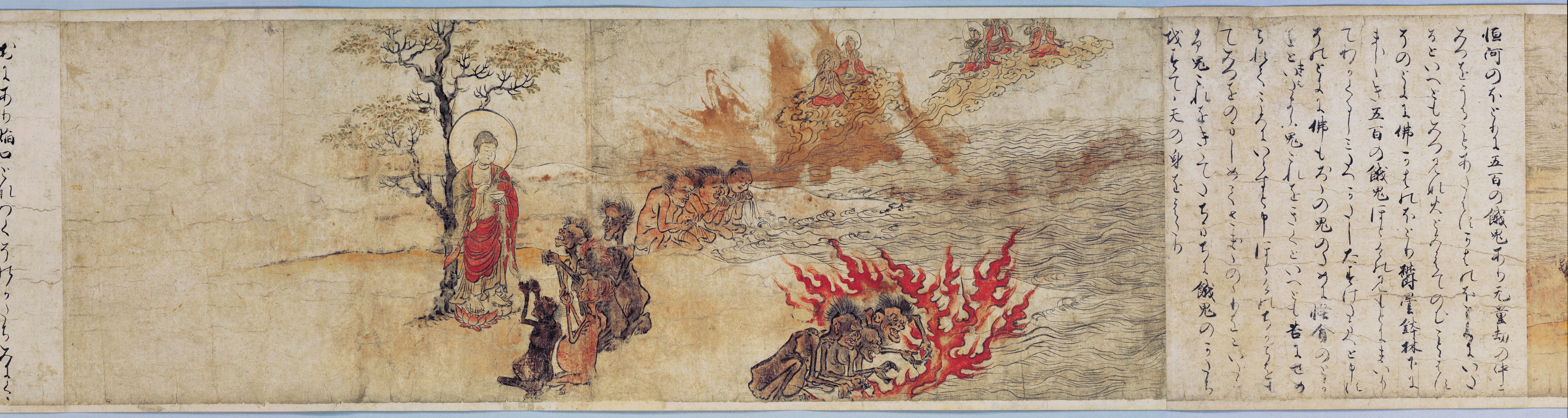
Hungry ghosts in a 12th-century painting from Kyoto, Japan

- Hungry ghost realm: hungry ghosts and other restless spirits (preta) are rebirths caused by karma of excessive craving and attachments. They do not have a body, are invisible and constitute only "subtle matter" of a being. Buddhist texts describe them as beings who are extremely thirsty and hungry, with very small mouths but very large stomachs. Buddhist traditions in Asia attempt to care for them on ritual-days every year, by leaving food and drinks in the open, to feed any hungry ghosts nearby. When their bad karma demerit runs out, these beings are reborn into another realm. According to McClelland, this realm is the mildest of the three evil realms. According to Yangsi Rinpoche, in contrast, the suffering of the beings born in the realm of the hungry ghosts is far more intense than those born in the animal realm.
- Hell realm: beings in hell (Skt. naraka; P. niraya) enter this realm for evil karma such as theft, lying, adultery and others. The texts vary in their details, but typically describe numerous hellish regions each with different forms of intense suffering. These typically include eight hot hells and eight cold hells, as well as hells in which beings are eaten alive, beat, and tortured depending on the unwholesome karma accumulated. Upon exhausting their unwholesome karma, the beings in hell perish and are born in successively higher realms. This realm differs from the Christian conception of hell in that existence in this realm is temporary and not final damnation.

Tibetan Buddhism proposes that a buddha exists in each of the six realms. These six buddhas have also been known as the "Six Sages." They are: Indraśakra Buddha in the god realm, Vemacitra Buddha of the petty god realm, Śākyamuni Buddha in the human realm; Sthīrasiṃha Buddha in the animal realm, Jvālamukha Buddha in the hungry ghost realm, and Yāma Dharmarāja as the buddha in the hot hell realm.

== Cause and end ==
Samsara is perpetuated by one's karma, which is caused by craving and ignorance (avidyā).

=== Karma ===
Samsara is perpetuated by karma. (Note: The driving force behind rebirth in the six realms of samsara is karma: Peter Harvey: "The movement of beings between rebirths is not a haphazard process but is ordered and governed by the law of karma, the principle that beings are reborn according to the nature and quality of their past actions; they are 'heir' to their actions (M.III.123)."; Damien Keown: "In the cosmology [of the realms of existence], karma functions as the elevator that takes people from one floor of the building to another. Good deeds result in an upward movement and bad deeds in a downward one. Karma is not a system of rewards and punishments meted out by God but a kind of natural law akin to the law of gravity. Individuals are thus the sole authors of their good and bad fortune."; Sogyal Rinpoche states: "The kind of birth we will have in the next life is determined, then, by the nature of our actions in this one. And it is important never to forget that the effect of our actions depends entirely upon the intention or motivation behind them, and not upon their scale."; Rupert Gethin: "What determines in which realm a being is born? The short answer is karma (Pali kamma): a being's intentional 'actions' of body, speech, and mind—whatever is done, said, or even just thought with definite intention or volition. In general, though with some qualification, rebirth in the lower realms is considered to be the result of relatively unwholesome (akuśala/akusala), or bad (pāpa) karma, while rebirth in the higher realms the result of relatively wholesome (kuśala/kusala), or good (puṇya/puñña) karma."; Paul Williams: "short of attaining enlightenment, in each rebirth one is born and dies, to be reborn elsewhere in accordance with the completely impersonal causal nature of one's own karma; this endless cycle of birth, rebirth, and redeath is Saṃsāra.") Karma or 'action' results from an intentional physical or mental act, which causes a future consequence. (Note: Aṅguttara Nikāya III.415: "It is "intention" that I call karma; having formed the intention, one performs acts (karma) by body, speech and mind.) Whether a deed is wholesome or unwholesome is determined by whether its underlying intention (cetanā) is wholesome or unwholesome. Thus, one's present existence in a particular realm and circumstance is determined by these actions (i.e., karma) from one's previous lives; and the circumstances of the future rebirth are determined by the actions in the current and previous lives. (Note: Padmasambhava: "If you want to know your past life, look into your present condition; if you want to know your future life, look at your present actions.")

=== Craving and ignorance ===
Inconsistencies in the oldest texts show that the Buddhist teachings on craving and ignorance, and the means to attain liberation, evolved, either during the lifetime of the Buddha, or thereafter. (Note: See: * Erich Frauwallner (1953), Geschichte der indischen Philosophie, Band Der Buddha und der Jina (pp. 147-272) * Andre Bareau (1963), Recherches sur la biographie du Buddha dans les Sutrapitaka et les Vinayapitaka anciens, Ecole Francaise d'Extreme-Orient * Schmithausen, On some Aspects of Descriptions or Theories of 'Liberating Insight' and 'Enlightenment' in Early Buddhism * K.R. Norman, Four Noble Truths * Tilman Vetter, The Ideas and Meditative Practices of Early Buddhism, by Tilmann Vetter * Gombrich 2006, chapter four * Bronkhorst 1993, chapter 7 * Anderson 1999) According to Frauwallner, the Buddhist texts show a shift in the explanation of the root cause of samsara. Originally craving was considered to be the root cause of samsara, (Note: Frauwallner (1953), as referenced by Vetter (1988), Flores (2009), and Williams, Tribe and Wynne (2012).) which could be stilled by the practice of dhyāna, leading to a calm of mind which according to Vetter is the liberation which is being sought.

The later Buddhist tradition considers ignorance to be the root cause of samsara. Avidya is misconception and ignorance about reality, leading to grasping and clinging, and repeated rebirth. According to Paul Williams, "it is the not-knowingness of things as they truly are, or of oneself as one really is." It can be overcome by insight into the true nature of reality. In the later Buddhist tradition "liberating insight" came to be regarded as equally liberating as the practice of dhyana. According to Vetter and Bronkhorst, this happened in response to other religious groups in India, who held that a liberating insight was an indispensable requisite for moksha, liberation from rebirth. (Note: Tillmann Vetter: "Very likely the cause was the growing influence of a non-Buddhist spiritual environment·which claimed that one can be released only by some truth or higher knowledge. In addition, the alternative (and perhaps sometimes competing) method of discriminating insight (fully established after the introduction of the four noble truths) seemed to conform so well to this claim." According to Bronkhorst, this happened under influence of the "mainstream of meditation," that is, Vedic-Brahmanical oriented groups, which believed that the cessation of action could not be liberating, since action can never be fully stopped. Their solution was to postulate a fundamental difference between the inner soul or self and the body. The inner self is unchangeable, and unaffected by actions. By insight into this difference, one was liberated. To equal this emphasis on insight, Buddhists presented insight into their most essential teaching as equally liberating. What exactly was regarded as the central insight "varied along with what was considered most central to the teaching of the Buddha.")

The ideas on what exactly constituted this "liberating insight" evolved over time. Initially the term prajna served to denote this "liberating insight." Later on, prajna was replaced in the suttas by the four truths. This happened in those texts where "liberating insight" was preceded by the four jhanas, and where this practice of the four jhanas then culminates in "liberating insight." (Note: In the Nikayas the four truths are given as the "liberating insight" which constituted the awakening, or "enlightenment" of the Buddha. When he understood these truths, he was "enlightened," and liberated, as reflected in Majjhima Nikaya 26:42: "his taints are destroyed by his seeing with wisdom." Typically, the four truths refer here to the eightfold path as the means to gain liberation, while the attainment of insight in the four truths is portrayed as liberating in itself.) The four truths were superseded by pratityasamutpada, and still later, in the Hinayana schools, by the doctrine of the non-existence of a substantial self or person. And Schmithausen states that still other descriptions of this "liberating insight" exist in the Buddhist canon:

"that the five Skandhas are impermanent, disagreeable, and neither the Self nor belonging to oneself"; (Note: Majjhima Nikaya 26) "the contemplation of the arising and disappearance (udayabbaya) of the five Skandhas"; (Note: Anguttara Nikaya II.45 (PTS)) "the realisation of the Skandhas as empty (rittaka), vain (tucchaka) and without any pith or substance (asaraka). (Note: Samyutta Nikaya III.140-142 (PTS))

=== Liberation ===
Saṃsāra ends when one attains liberation (Skt. mokṣa). In early Buddhism, liberation is identified with nirvana. In later Buddhism, liberation is tied to insight, especially the recognition and acceptance of non-self. Here, liberation from saṃsāra is defined as no longer seeing any soul or self. (Note: Phra Thepyanmongkol: "The designation that is Nibbana [Nirvana] is anatta (non-self)", states Buddha, in Parivara Vinayapitaka.) This equating of liberation and non-self appears throughout early Buddhist texts.

Some Buddhist texts suggest that rebirth occurs through the transfer of consciousness (Skt. vijiñāna; P. vinnana) from one life to another. When this consciousness ceases, then liberation is attained. There is a connection between consciousness, karmic activities, and the cycle of rebirth in that, with the destruction of consciousness, there is "destruction and cessation of "karmic activities" (anabhisankhara, S III, 53), which are considered in Buddhism to be "necessary for the continued perpetuation of cyclic existence."

While Buddhism considers the liberation from samsara as the ultimate spiritual goal, in traditional practice, Buddhists seek and accumulate merit through good deeds, donations to monks and various Buddhist rituals in order to gain better rebirths rather than nirvana.

=== Impermanence and Non-Self Reality ===
A value of Buddhism is the idea of impermanence. All living things, causes, conditions, situations are impermanent. Impermanence is the idea that all things disappear once they have originated. Impermanence occurs "moment to moment", and this is why there is no recognition of the self. Since everything is in a state of decay, permanent happiness and self cannot exist in samsara.

Anatta is the Buddhist idea of non-self. Winston L. King, a writer from the University of Hawai'i Press, references two integral parts of Anatta in Philosophy East and West. King details the first aspect, that Anatta can be "experienced and not just described." King states the second aspect of Anatta is that it is the liberation from the "power of samsaric drives." Obtaining awareness of Anatta and non-self reality results in a, "freedom from the push-pull of his own appetites, passions, ambitions, and fixations and from the external world's domination in general, that is, the conquest of greed, hatred, and delusion." This "push-pull" of mundane human existence or samsara results in dukka, but the recognition of Anatta results in a "freedom from the push-pull."

== Psychological interpretation ==
According to Chögyam Trungpa the realms of samsara can refer to both "psychological states of mind and physical cosmological realms". (Note: Chogyam Trungpa states: "In the Buddhist system of the six realms, the three higher realms are the god realm, the jealous-god realm, and the human realm; the three lower realms are the animal realm, the hungry ghost realm, and the hell realm. These realms can refer to psychological states or to aspects of Buddhist cosmology.")

Gethin argues, rebirth in the different realms is determined by one's karma, which is directly determined by one's psychological states. The Buddhist cosmology may thus be seen as a map of different realms of existence and a description of all possible psychological experiences. The psychological states of a person in current life lead to the nature of next rebirth in Buddhist cosmology.

Paul Williams acknowledges Gethin's suggestion of the "principle of the equivalence of cosmology and psychology," but notes that Gethin is not asserting the Buddhist cosmology is really all about current or potential states of mind or psychology. The realms in Buddhist cosmology are indeed realms of rebirths. Otherwise rebirth would always be into the human realm, or there would be no rebirth at all. And that is not traditional Buddhism, states Williams.

David McMahan concludes that the attempts to construe ancient Buddhist cosmology in modern psychological terms is modernistic reconstruction, "detraditionalization and demythologization" of Buddhism, a sociological phenomenon that is seen in all religions.

A pre-modern form of this interpretation can be seen in the views of the sixth-century Chinese monk Zhiyi, whose writings became the foundation for the Tiantai school in China, particularly in a concept named "the trichiliocosm in a single instant of thought" (一念三千 Ch. yíniàn sānqiān; Ja. ichinen sanzen), which proposes that the vastness of all space is contained in the shortest span of a single thought. The Record of Linji, an anthology of the teachings of the ninth-century Chinese monk Linji Yixuan, also presents the view that the Three Realms originate with the mind.

== Alternative translations ==
- Conditioned existence (Daniel Goleman)
- Cycle of clinging and taking birth in one desire after another (Phillip Moffitt)
- Cycle of existence
- Cyclic existence (Jeffry Hopkins)
- Uncontrollably recurring rebirth (Alexander Berzin)
- Wheel of suffering (Mingyur Rinpoche)

== See also ==
- Bhavacakra
- Buddhist cosmology
- Index of Buddhism-related articles
- Nirvana (Buddhism)
- Rebirth (Buddhism)
- Secular Buddhism

== Sources ==
Printed sources

- Ajahn Sucitto (2010), Turning the Wheel of Truth: Commentary on the Buddha's First Teaching, Shambhala
- Anderson, Carol (1999), Pain and Its Ending: The Four Noble Truths in the Theravada Buddhist Canon, Routledge
- Bowker, John, ed. (1997), The Oxford Dictionary of World Religions, Oxford
- Bronkhorst, Johannes (1993), The Two Traditions Of Meditation In Ancient India, Motilal Banarsidass Publishers
- Buswell, Robert E.; Gimello, Robert M. (1992), Paths to Liberation: The Mārga and Its Transformations in Buddhist Thought, University of Hawaii Press, ISBN 978-0-8248-1253-9, archived from the original on 2017-03-24
- Buswell, Robert E., ed. (2004), Encyclopedia of Buddhism, Macmillan Reference USA, ISBN 978-0-02-865718-9
- Buswell, Robert; Lopez, Donald, eds. (2013), Princeton Dictionary of Buddhism, Princeton, NJ: Princeton University Press, ISBN 9780691157863
- Chogyam Trungpa (2009), The Truth of Suffering and the Path of Liberation (edited by Judy Leif), Shambhala
- Choong, Mun-Keat (1999), The Notion of Emptiness in Early Buddhism, Motilal Banarsidass, ISBN 978-81-208-1649-7, archived from the original on 2016-11-27
- Cohen, Robert S. (2006). Beyond Enlightenment: Buddhism, Religion, Modernity. Routledge.
- Conze, Edward (2013), Buddhist Thought in India: Three Phases of Buddhist Philosophy, Routledge, ISBN 978-1-134-54231-4, archived from the original on 2016-08-31
- Dalai Lama (1992), The Meaning of Life, translated and edited by Jeffrey Hopkins, Wisdom
- Edelglass, William; et al. (2009), Buddhist Philosophy: Essential Readings, Oxford University Press, ISBN 978-0-19-532817-2, archived from the original on 2017-02-24
- Flores, Ralph (2009), Buddhist Scriptures as Literature: Sacred Rhetoric and the Uses of Theory, State University of New York Press, ISBN 978-0-7914-7340-5, archived from the original on 2017-03-24
- Fowler, Merv (1999), Buddhism: Beliefs and Practices, Sussex Academic Press, ISBN 978-1-898723-66-0, archived from the original on 2016-11-21
- Gethin, Rupert (1998), Foundations of Buddhism, Oxford University Press
- Gombrich, Richard F. (1997). How Buddhism Began: The Conditioned Genesis of the Early Teachings. Routledge. ISBN 978-1-134-19639-5. Archived from the original on 2020-05-19.
- Gombrich, Richard F. (2006). How Buddhism Began: The Conditioned Genesis of the Early Teachings. Routledge. ISBN 978-1-134-19639-5. Archived from the original on 2020-05-19.
- Harvey, Peter (1990), An Introduction to Buddhism, Cambridge University Press
- Padmanabh Jaini (1980). Wendy Doniger (ed.). Karma and Rebirth in Classical Indian Traditions. University of California Press. ISBN 978-0-520-03923-0.
- Juergensmeyer, Mark; Roof, Wade Clark (2011), Encyclopedia of Global Religion, SAGE Publications, ISBN 978-1-4522-6656-5, archived from the original on 2019-03-31
- Keown, Damien (2013). Buddhism: A Very Short Introduction. Oxford University Press. ISBN 978-0-19-966383-5. Archived from the original on 2017-03-23.
- Keown, Damien (2000), Buddhism: A Very Short Introduction, Oxford University Press, Kindle Edition
- Keown, Damien (2004), A Dictionary of Buddhism, Oxford University Press, ISBN 978-0-19-157917-2
- Laumakis, Stephen J. (2008). An Introduction to Buddhist Philosophy. Cambridge University Press. ISBN 978-1-139-46966-1. Archived from the original on 2017-01-21.
- McClelland, Norman C. (2010), Encyclopedia of Reincarnation and Karma, McFarland, ISBN 978-0-7864-5675-8, archived from the original on 2016-11-26
- The Middle Length Discourses of the Buddha: A New Translation of the Majjhima Nikaya, translated by Nanamoli, Bhikkhu, Boston: Wisdom Publications, 1995, ISBN 978-0-86171-072-0
- Obeyesekere, Gananath (1980). Wendy Doniger (ed.). Karma and Rebirth in Classical Indian Traditions. University of California Press. ISBN 978-0-520-03923-0.
- Obeyesekere, Gananath (2005). Wendy Doniger (ed.). Karma and Rebirth: A Cross Cultural Study. Motilal Banarsidass. ISBN 978-8120826090.
- Patrul Rinpoche (1998), The Words of My Perfect Teacher, Altamira
- Rahula, Walpola (2014), What the Buddha Taught, Oneworld Classics, ISBN 978-1-78074-000-3, archived from the original on 2016-08-31
- Smith, Huston; Novak, Philip (2009), Buddhism: A Concise Introduction, HarperOne, Kindle Edition
- Sogyal Rinpoche (2009), The Tibetan Book of Living and Dying, Harper Collins, Kindle Edition
- Trainor, Kevin (2004), Buddhism: The Illustrated Guide, Oxford University Press, ISBN 978-0-19-517398-7, archived from the original on 2020-05-18
- Vetter, Tilmann (1988), The Ideas and Meditative Practices of Early Buddhism, BRILL
- Waldron, William S. (2003), The Buddhist Unconscious: The Alaya-vijñana in the context of Indian Buddhist Thought, Routledge
- Williams, Paul (2002), Buddhist Thought, Routledge, ISBN 978-0-415207010
- Williams, Paul; Tribe, Anthony; Wynne, Alexander (2012), Buddhist Thought: A Complete Introduction to the Indian Tradition, Routledge, ISBN 978-1-136-52088-4, archived from the original on 2020-11-20
- Wilson, Jeff (2010), Saṃsāra and Rebirth, in Buddhism, Oxford University Press, doi:10.1093/obo/9780195393521-0141, ISBN 9780195393521

Web-sources
