= Nirvana in Buddhism =

Highest spiritual attainment in Buddhist cultivation

Translations of Nirvana
- English: blowing out, extinguishing, liberation
- Sanskrit: निर्वाण 𑖡𑖰𑖨𑖿𑖪𑖯𑖜 (IAST: nirvāṇa)
- Pali: निब्बान nibbāna
- Bengali: নির্বাণ nirban
- Burmese: နိဗ္ဗာန် (MLCTS: neɪʔbàɰ̃)
- Chinese: 涅槃 (Pinyin: nièpán)
- Indonesian: nirwana, kepadaman, pemadaman
- Japanese: 涅槃 (Rōmaji: nehan)
- Khmer: និព្វាន (UNGEGN: nĭppéan)
- Korean: 열반 (RR: yeolban)
- Mon: နဳဗာန် ([nìppàn])
- Mongolian: ᠨᠢᠷᠸᠠᠨ/нирван (nirvan)
- Shan: ၼိၵ်ႈပၢၼ်ႇ ([nik3paan2])
- Sinhala: නිවන (nivana)
- Tagalog: nirvana
- Tibetan: མྱ་ངན་ལས་འདས་པ། mya ngan las 'das pa
- Thai: นิพพาน (RTGS: nipphan)
- Vietnamese: Niết bàn

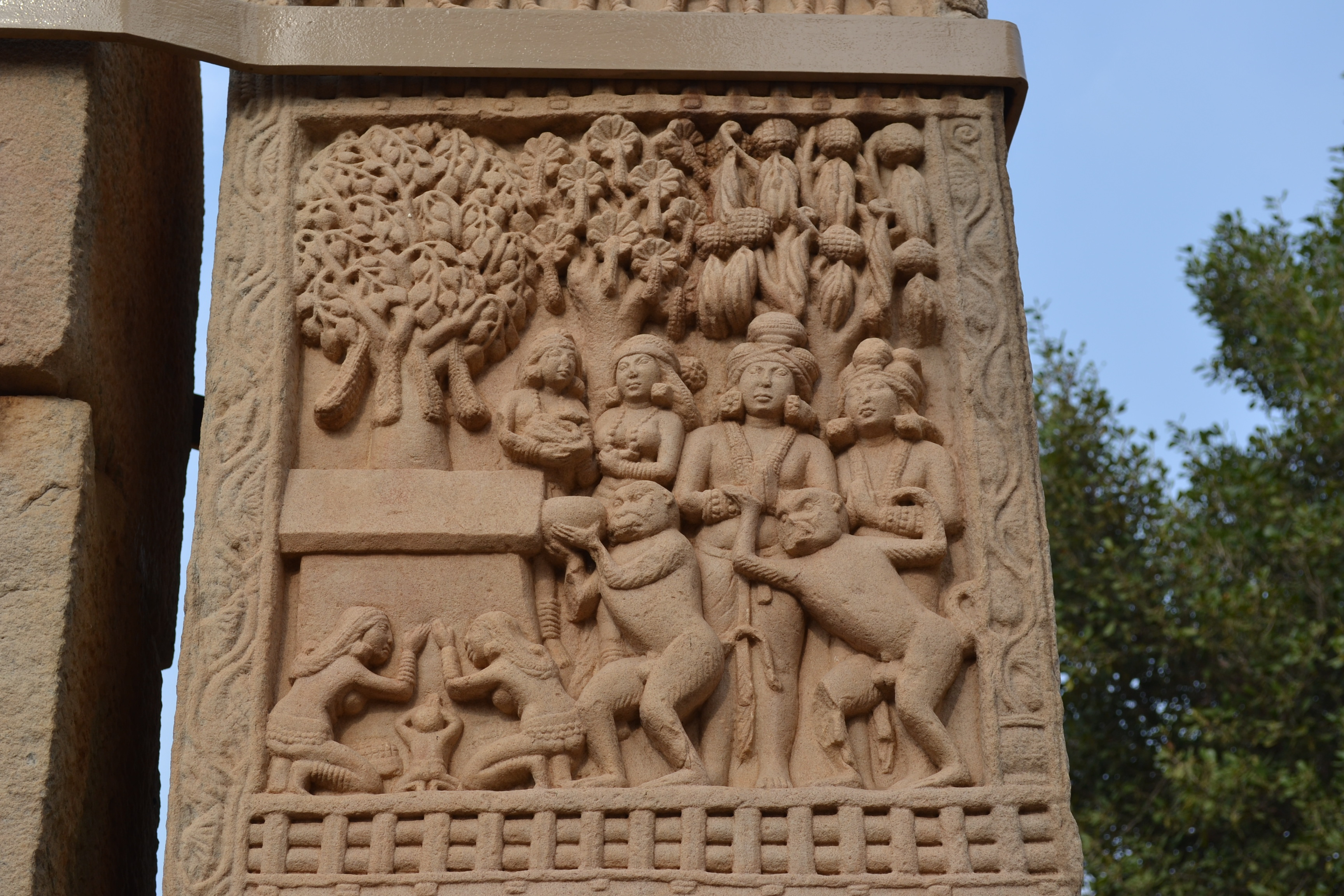
Aniconic carving representing the final nirvana of a Buddha at Sanchi.

Nirvana or nibbana (Sanskrit: निर्वाण; IAST: nirvāṇa; Pali: nibbāna) is the extinguishing of the passions, the "blowing out" or "quenching" of the activity of the grasping mind and its related suffering, stresses, and unease. Nirvana is the goal of many Buddhist paths, and leads to the soteriological release from dukkha ('suffering') and rebirths in saṃsāra. Nirvana is part of the Third Truth on "cessation of dukkha" in the Four Noble Truths, and is the "summum bonum of Buddhism and goal of the Eightfold Path."

In all forms of Buddhism, Nirvana is regarded as the highest or supreme religious goal. It is often described as the unconditioned or uncompounded (Skt.: asaṃskṛta, Pali: asankhata), meaning it is beyond all forms of conditionality — not subject to change, decay, or the limitations of time and space. Nirvana is typically seen as being outside the realm of dependent arising (pratītyasamutpāda), representing a truth that transcends cause and effect, as well as all conventional dualities such as existence and non-existence, or life and death. Nirvana is also said to transcend all conceptual frameworks, being beyond the grasp of ordinary human perception.

In the Buddhist tradition, nirvana has commonly been interpreted as the extinction of the "three poisons" of greed (raga), aversion (dvesha) and ignorance (moha). In early Buddhist sources, these are also known as the "three fires" (an analogy that internalizes and inverts the three fires of Vedic ritual). (Note: According to Gombrich, the use of the term "three fires" alludes to the three fires which a brahmin householder had to keep alight, and tend daily. In later Buddhism, the origin of this metaphor was forgotten, and the term was replaced with "the three poisons.) When these three poisons are extinguished, permanent release from saṃsāra, the cycle of grasping, suffering and rebirth, is attained. What this means was interpreted differently by the various Indian Buddhist schools. Some like the Vaibhāṣika school, held that Nirvana was a really existent transcendent reality (dravyasat), while others (Sautrāntika) held that Nirvana was merely a name for the total cessation of suffering and rebirth. Nirvana has also been claimed by some scholars to be identical with insight into anatta (non-self) and sunyata (emptiness), though this is hotly contested by other scholars and practicing monks.

Traditional sources distinguish between two types of nirvana: sopadhishesa-nirvana literally "nirvana with a remainder", attained and maintained during life, and parinirvana or anupadhishesa-nirvana, meaning "nirvana without remainder" or final nirvana (attained after the bodily death of a fully enlightened person). Nirvana, as the quenching of the three poisons (and all defilements) and the complete ending of all rebirth, is the most common soteriological aim in the Theravada tradition.

In Mahayana Buddhism, a further distinction is made between the "abiding" nirvana (equated with the nirvana of non-Mahayana Buddhism) and the Mahayanist nirvana which is "non-abiding" (apratiṣṭhita). In Mahayana, the highest goal is Buddhahood, which is seen as a non-abiding kind of nirvana that allows a Buddha to continue to manifest in samsara in order to guide living beings on the path. Thus, a Buddha is not 'stuck' or 'fixed' in a transcendent reality, nor does a Buddha dissolve into a state of cessation, but continues to manifest in the world through countless transformation bodies (nirmāṇakāya), while also retaining a transcendent dimension (saṃbhogakāya).

== Etymology and meaning ==
The term nirvana is part of an extensive metaphorical structure that was probably established at a very early age in Buddhism. It is "the most common term used by Buddhists to describe a state of freedom from suffering and rebirth," but its etymology may not be conclusive for its meaning. Different Buddhist traditions have interpreted the concept in different ways, without reaching consensus over its meaning. (Note: Buswell: "It is found in dictionaries as an English word, nirvana, and has acquired a patina that makes many assume its meaning is obvious. Yet, it is a word about which Buddhists themselves have never reached agreement.) Various etymologies are:

- vâna, derived from the root word √vā which means "to blow": (Note: Possible ancient meanings of nirvana Victor Langheld,)
  - (To) blow (of wind); but also to emit (an odour), be wafted or diffused; nirvana then means "to blow out"; (Note: Bhikkhu Bodhi: "Etymologically, the word nibbāna — the Pali form of the better known Sanskrit nirvāṇa — is derived from a verb nibbāti meaning "to be blown out" or "to be extinguished." It thus signifies the extinguishing of the worldly "fires" of greed, hatred, and delusion. But the Pali commentators prefer to treat it as the negation of, or "departure from" (nikkhantatta), the entanglement (vāna) of craving, the derivation which is offered here. For as long as one is entangled by craving, one remains bound in saṃsāra, the cycle of birth and death; but when all craving has been extirpated, one attains Nibbāna, deliverance from the cycle of birth and death.)
- vāna, derived from the root vana or van which means "desire",
  - nirvana is then explained to mean a state of "without desire, without love, without wish" and one without craving or thirst (taṇhā);
  - Adding the root √vā which means "to weave or sew"; nirvana is then explained as abandoning the desire which weaves together life after life. (Note: Even Buddhaghosa, the great Theravada commentator, ignored the original etymological meaning of the word, and presented an interpretation of nirvana based on the root √vā, "to weave.")
- vāna, derived from the root word vana which also means "woods, forest":
  - Based on this root, vana has been metaphorically explained by Buddhist scholars as referring to the "forest of defilements", or the five aggregates; nirvana then means "escape from the aggregates", or to be "free from that forest of defilements". (Note: Gombrich explains that the five skandhas or aggregates are the bundles of firewood that fuel the three fires. The Buddhist practitioner ought to "drop" these bundles, so that the fires are no longer fueled and "blow out".)

=== Origins ===
The origin of the term nirvana is probably pre-Buddhist. It was a more or less central concept among the Jains, the Ajivikas, the Buddhists, and certain Hindu traditions, and the term may have been imported into Buddhism with much of its semantic range from these other sramanic movements.

The ideas of spiritual liberation using different terminology, are found in ancient texts of non-Buddhist Indian traditions, such as in verse 4.4.6 of the Brihadaranyaka Upanishad of Hinduism, but the term nirvana in the soteriological sense of "blown out, extinguished" state of liberation does not appear in the Vedas nor in the pre-Buddhist Upanishads. According to Collins, "the Buddhists seem to have been the first to call it nirvana."

=== Extinction and blowing out ===
One literal interpretation translates nir-vā as "blow out," interpreting nir as negative and va as "to blow," giving a meaning of "blowing out" or "quenching". It is seen to refer both to the act and the effect of blowing (at something) to put it out, but also the process and outcome of burning out, becoming extinguished. (Note: Buswell: "The Sanskrit term nirvana is an action noun signifying the act and effect of blowing (at something) to put it out, to blow out, or to extinguish, but the noun also signifies the process and outcome of burning out, becoming extinguished, cooling down, and hence, allaying, calming down, and also taming, making docile. Technically, in the religious traditions of India, the term denotes the process of accomplishing and experiencing freedom from the unquenchable thirst of desire and the pains of repeated births, lives, and deaths.) The "blowing out" does not mean total annihilation, but the extinguishing of a flame. The term nirvana can also be used as a verb: "he or she nirvāṇa-s," or "he or she parinirvāṇa-s" (parinibbāyati). (Note: Rupert Gethin: "Literally nirvāṇa means 'blowing out' or 'extinguishing', although Buddhist commentarial writings, by a play on words, like to explain it as 'the absence of craving'. But where English translations of Buddhist texts have 'he attains nirvāṇa/parinirvāṇa', the more characteristic Pali or Sanskrit idiom is a simple verb: 'he or she nirvāṇa-s' or more often 'he or she parinirvānṇa-s' (parinibbāyati). What the Pali and Sanskrit expression primarily indicates is the event or process of the extinction of the 'fires' of greed, aversion, and delusion.")

In the Buddhist tradition, nirvana, "to blow out", has commonly been interpreted as the extinction of the "three fires", or "three poisons", namely passion or sensuality (raga), aversion or hate (dvesha) and delusion or ignorance (moha or avidyā).

According to Gombrich, the number of "three fires" alludes to the three fires that a Brahmin had to keep alight, which symbolised life in the world, as a family man. The meaning of this metaphor was lost in later Buddhism, (Note: Gombrich: "I hope it is not too farfetched to suggest that this may have contributed to an important development in the Mahayana: that it came to separate nirvana from bodhi, 'awakening' to the truth, Enlightenment, and to put a lower value on the former. Originally nirvana and bodhi refer to the same thing; they merely use different metaphors for the experience. But the Mahayana tradition separated them and considered that nirvana referred only to the extinction of craving, with the resultant escape from the cycle of rebirth. This interpretation ignores the third fire, delusion: the extinction of delusion is of course in the early texts identical with what can be positively expressed as gnosis, Enlightenment.) and other explanations of the word nirvana were sought. Not only passion, hatred and delusion were to be extinguished, but also all cankers (asava) or defilements (khlesa). (Note: Not only the three fires, but also the extinction of the defilements and tanha are mentioned as nirvana: "Calming of all conditioned things, giving up of all defilements, extinction of "thirst", detachment, cessation, Nibbāna." (Saṃyutta-nikāya I (PTS), p. 136); "O Rādha, the extinction of 'thirst' (Taṇhakkhayo) is Nibbāna." (Saṃyutta-nikāya I (PTS), p. 190); Sutta-nipata: "Where there is nothing; where naught is grasped, there is the Isle of No-Beyond. Nirvāṇa do I call it—the utter extinction of aging and dying."; Majjhima Nikaya 2-Att. 4.68: "The liberated mind (citta) that no longer clings' means nibbāna.")

=== Weaving and woods ===
Later exegetical works developed a whole new set of folk etymological definitions of the word nirvana, using the root vana to refer to the verb "to blow", but re-parsing the word to roots that mean "weaving, sewing", "desire" and "forest or woods."

=== To unbind ===
Ṭhānissaro Bhikkhu argues that the term nibbāna was apparently derived etymologically from the negative prefix, nir, plus the root vāṇa, or binding: unbinding, and that the associated adjective is nibbuta: unbound, and the associated verb, nibbuti: to unbind. He and others use the term unbinding for nibbana. Ṭhānissaro argues that the early Buddhist association of 'blowing out' with the term arose in light of the way in which the processes of fire were viewed at that time - a burning fire was seen as clinging to its fuel in a state of hot agitation, and that when going out the fire let go of its fuel and reached a state of freedom, cooling, and peace.

=== To uncover ===
Matsumoto Shirō (1950–), of the Critical Buddhism group, stated that the original etymological root of nirvana should be considered not as nir√vā, but as nir√vŗ, to "uncover". According to Matsumoto, the original meaning of nirvana was therefore not "to extinguish" but "to uncover" the atman from that which is anatman (not atman). Swanson stated that some Buddhism scholars questioned whether 'blowing out' and 'extinction' etymologies are consistent with the core doctrines of Buddhism, particularly about anatman (non-self) and pratityasamutpada (causality). They saw a problem in considering nirvana as extinction or liberation as this presupposes a "self" to be extinguished or liberated. However other Buddhist scholars, such as Takasaki Jikidō, disagreed and called the Matsumoto proposal "too far and leaving nothing that can be called Buddhist".

=== Synonymous with moksha and vimutti ===
Nirvana is used synonymously with moksha (Sanskrit), also vimoksha, or vimutti (Pali), "release, deliverance from suffering". (Note: John Bowker (1997), Vimutti, The Concise Oxford Dictionary of World Religions) (Note: "Vimoksha [解脱] (Skt; Jpn gedatsu ). Emancipation, release, or liberation. The Sanskrit words vimukti, mukti, and moksha also have the same meaning. Vimoksha means release from the bonds of earthly desires, delusion, suffering, and transmigration. While Buddhism sets forth various kinds and stages of emancipation, or enlightenment, the supreme emancipation is nirvana, a state of perfect quietude, freedom, and deliverance." (Note: The Soka Gakkai Dictionary of Buddhism, vimoksha Archived 2014-02-22 at the Wayback Machine)) In the Pali-canon two kinds of vimutti are discerned:

- Ceto-vimutti, freedom of mind; it is the qualified freedom from suffering, attained through the practice of dhyane (meditation, samādhi). Vetter translates this as "release of the heart" which means conquering desire thereby attaining a desire-less state of living.
- Pañña-vimutti, freedom through understanding (prajña); it is the final release from suffering and the end of rebirth, attained through the practice of insight meditation (vipassanā).

Ceto-vimutti becomes permanent, only with the attainment of pañña-vimutti. According to Gombrich and other scholars, this distinction may be a later development within the canon, reflecting a growing emphasis in earliest Buddhism on prajña, instead of the liberating practice of dhyana; it may also reflect a successful assimilation of non-Buddhist meditation practices in ancient India into the Buddhist canon. According to Anālayo, the term uttari-vimutti (highest liberation) is also widely used in the early Buddhist texts to refer to liberation from the cycle of rebirth.

== Interpretations of the early Buddhist concept ==
=== Cessation ===
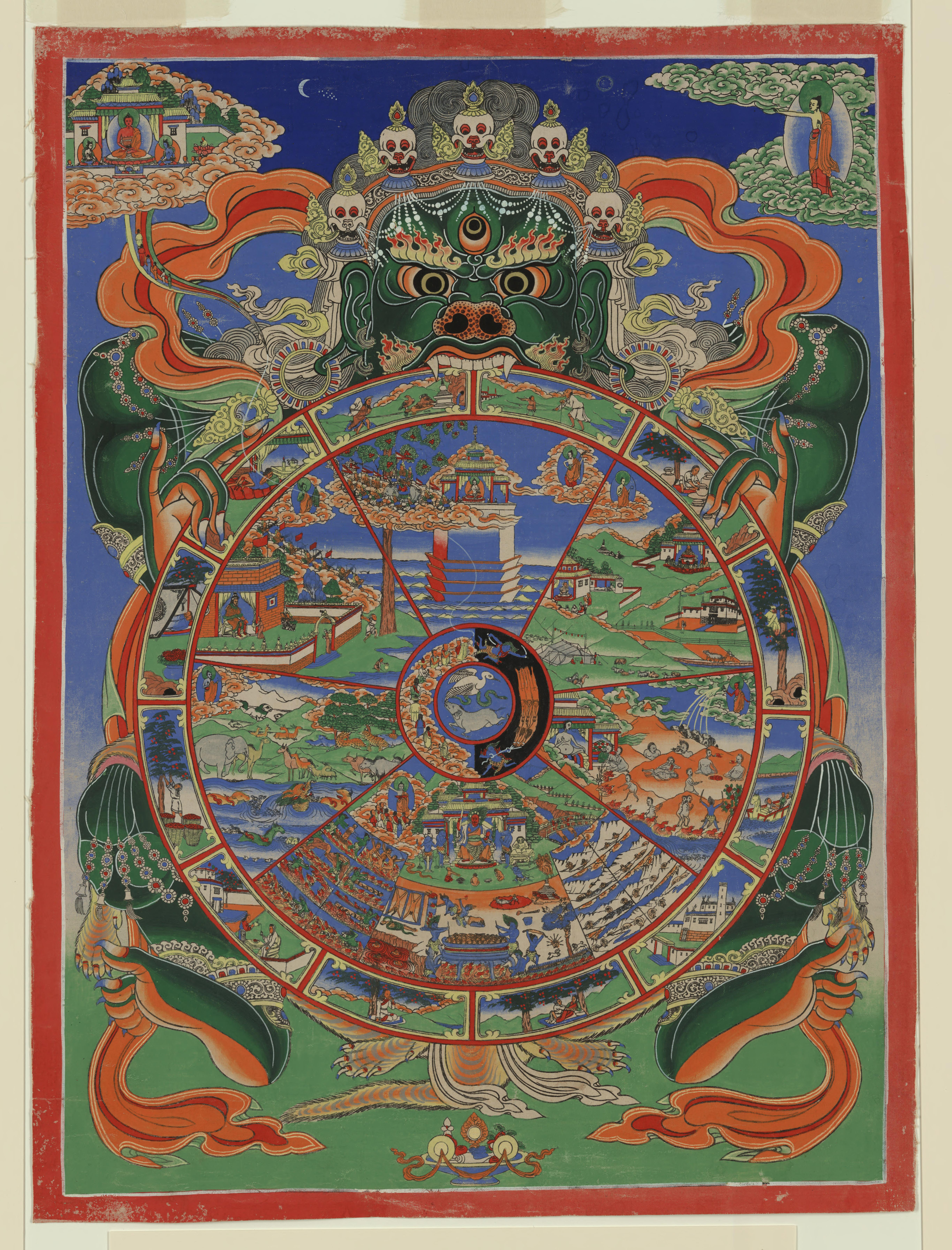
The Bhavachakra, an illustration of the cycle of rebirth, with the three poisons at the hub of the wheel.

In the early texts, the practice of the noble path and the four dhyanas was said to lead to the extinction of the three fires, and then proceed to the cessation of all discursive thoughts and apperceptions, then ceasing all feelings (happiness and sadness). According to Collins, "the most common thing said about nirvana in Buddhist texts is that it is the ending of suffering (dukkha)." According to Collins, the term is also widely used as a verb, one therefore "nirvanizes." A synonym widely used for nirvana in early texts is "deathless" or "deathfree" (Pali: amata, sanskrit: amrta (Note: In the Vedic ritual, drinking soma produced amrita; the later sramana traditions rejected ritual as a means to attain amrita.)) and refers to a condition "where there is no death, because there is also no birth, no coming into existence, nothing made by conditioning, and therefore no time." Nirvana is also called "unconditioned" (asankhata), meaning it is unlike all other conditioned phenomena.

Thomas Kasulis notes that in the early texts, nirvana is often described in negative terms, including “cessation” (nirodha), “the absence of craving” (trsnaksaya), “detachment,” “the absence of delusion,” and “the unconditioned” (asamskrta). He also notes that there is little discussion in the early Buddhist texts about the metaphysical nature of nirvana, since they seem to hold that metaphysical speculation is an obstacle to the goal. Kasulis mentions the Malunkyaputta sutta which denies any view about the existence of the Buddha after his final bodily death, all positions (the Buddha exists after death, does not exist, both or neither) are rejected. Likewise, another sutta (AN II 161) has Sāriputta saying that asking the question "is there anything else?" after the physical death of someone who has attained nirvana is conceptualizing or proliferating (papañca) about that which is without proliferation (appapañcaṃ) and thus a kind of distorted thinking bound up with the self.

Nirvāṇa is the permanent cessation of samsara ("wandering") and jāti (birth, becoming). (Note: See: Rupert Gethin: "Literally nirvāṇa means 'blowing out' or 'extinguishing' [...] What the Pali and Sanskrit expression primarily indicates is the event or process of the extinction of the 'fires' of greed, aversion, and delusion. At the moment the Buddha understood suffering, its arising, its cessation, and the path leading to its cessation, these fires were extinguished. This process is the same for all who reach awakening, (Note: Vetter, Gombrich, and Bronkhorst, among others, notes that the emphasis on "liberating insight" is a later development. In the earliest Buddhism, the practice of dhyana may have been the sole liberating practice, with bodhi denoting the insight that dhyana is an affective means to still the fires.) and the early texts term it either nirvāṇa or parinirvāṇa, the complete 'blowing out' or 'extinguishing' of the 'fires' of greed, aversion, and delusion. This is not a 'thing' but an event or experience. (Note: Robert Sharf notices that "experience" is a typical modern, western word. In the 19th century, "experience" came to be seen as a means to "prove" religious "realities".); Paul Williams: "[Nirvana] means 'extinguishing', as in 'the extinguishing of a flame', and it signifies soteriologically the complete extinguishing of greed, hatred, and fundamentally delusion (i.e. ignorance), the forces which power samsara."; Paul Williams: "Nirvana is broadly speaking the result of letting-go, letting-go the very forces of craving which power continued experiences of pleasure and inevitably suffering throughout this life, death, rebirth, and redeath. That, in a nutshell, is what nirvana is. It is the complete and permanent cessation of samsara, thence the cessation of all types of suffering, resulting from letting-go the forces which power samsara, due to overcoming ignorance (thence also hatred and delusion, the 'three root poisons') through seeing things the way they really are."; Donald Lopez: "[Nirvana] is used to refer to the extinction of desire, hatred, and ignorance and, ultimately, of suffering and rebirth." (Note: Donald S. Lopez Jr., Nirvana, Encyclopedia Britannica); Damien Keown states: "When the flame of craving is extinguished, rebirth ceases, and an enlightened person is not reborn.") As Bhikkhu Bodhi states "For as long as one is entangled by craving, one remains bound in saṃsāra, the cycle of birth and death; but when all craving has been extirpated, one attains Nibbāna, deliverance from the cycle of birth and death."

Gethin notes that nirvana "is not a 'thing' but an event or experience" that frees one from rebirth in samsara. According to Donald Swearer, the journey to nirvana is not a journey to a "separate reality" (contra Vedic religion or Jainism), but a move towards calm, equanimity, nonattachment and nonself. In this sense, the soteriological view of early Buddhism is seen as a reaction to earlier Indic metaphysical views.

According to Collins, nirvana is associated with a meditative attainment called the 'Cessation of Perception/Ideation and Feeling' (sannavedayitanirodha), also known as the 'Attainment of Cessation' (nirodhasamapatti). In later Buddhism, dhyana practice was deemed sufficient only for the extinguishing of passion and hatred, while delusion was extinguished by insight.

=== As a metaphysical reality or transcendent consciousness ===
The Franco-Belgian school of indology held a different view of nirvana. According to this tradition of scholarship, the view of primitive Buddhism was that nirvana was a positive reality, a kind of immortal state (amrta) similar to the godly abode of svarga found in the Edicts of Ashoka.

Peter Harvey has defended the idea that nirvana in the Pali suttas refers to a kind of transformed and transcendent consciousness (viññana) that has "stopped" (nirodhena). According to Harvey this nirvanic consciousness is said to be "objectless", "infinite" (anantam), "unsupported" (appatiṭṭhita) and "non-manifestive" (anidassana) as well as "beyond time and spatial location". Rune Johansson's The Psychology of Nirvana also argues that nirvana could be seen as a transformed state of mind (citta).

Bhikkhu Bodhi, a Theravada monk, translator and scholar, argues that various descriptions of nibbana from the early buddhist texts "convey a more concrete idea of the ultimate goal" which differs from mere cessation and "speak of Nibbana almost as if it were a transcendent state or dimension of being." Bodhi notes that nibbana is sometimes described as a base (ayatana), an unborn and unconditioned state (pada), a reality (dhamma), and an "element" (dhatu). This transcendent state is compared to the ocean, which is "deep, immeasurable, [and] hard to fathom."

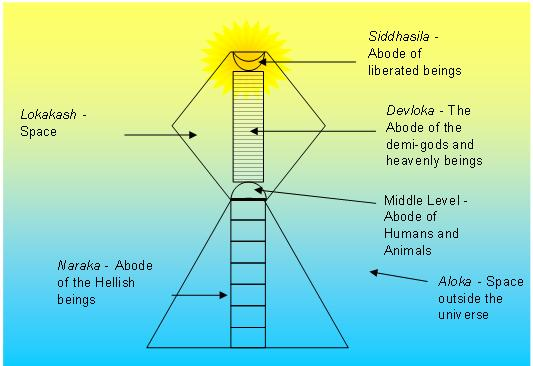
In the cosmology of Jainism, which is a closely related sramana tradition, liberated beings abide in an actual realm (loka) or abode (sila) associated with nirvana. Some scholars have argued that early Buddhism held a similar view.

Stanislaw Schayer, a Polish scholar, argued in the 1930s that the Nikayas preserve elements of an archaic form of Buddhism which is close to Brahmanical beliefs, which also survived in the Mahayana tradition. Schayer argued that the Theravada and Mahayana traditions could be "divergent, but equally reliable records" of a now lost pre-canonical Buddhism. The Mahayana tradition may have preserved some very old, pre-canonical teachings, which was mostly (but not completely) left out of the Theravada canon. Schayer saw nirvana as an immortal, deathless sphere, and as a transmundane reality. Schayer's position was also defended by Constantin Regamey, who saw the early Buddhist view of nirvana as being similar (but not the same) as some Brahamanical views of an eternal and absolute reality.

Edward Conze had similar ideas about nirvana, citing sources which speak of an eternal and "invisible infinite consciousness, which shines everywhere" as point to the view that nirvana is a kind of Absolute. A similar view was defended by M. Falk, who held that the nirvanic element, as an "essence" or pure consciousness, is immanent within samsara. M. Falk argues that the early Buddhist view of nirvana is that it is an "abode" or "place" of prajña, which is gained by the enlightened. (Note: See Digha Nikaya 15, Mahanidana Sutta, which describes a nine-fold chain of causation. Mind-and-body (nama-rupa) and consciousness (vijnana) do condition here each other (verse 2 & 3). In verse 21 and 22, it is stated that consciousness comes into the mother's womb, and finds a resting place in mind-and-body.) (Note: M. Falk (1943, Nama-rupa and Dharma-rupa) This nirvanic element, as an "essence" or pure consciousness, is immanent within samsara. (Note: According to Alexander Wynne, Schayer:"referred to passages in which "consciousness" (vinnana) seems to be the ultimate reality or substratum (e.g. A I.10) 14 as well as the Saddhatu Sutra, which is not found in any canonical source but is cited in other Buddhist texts — it states that the personality (pudgala) consists of the six elements (dhatu) of earth, water, fire, wind, space and consciousness; Schayer noted that it related to other ancient Indian ideas. Keith’s argument is also based on the Saddhatu Sutra as well as "passages where we have explanations of Nirvana which echo the ideas of the Upanishads regarding the ultimate reality." He also refers to the doctrine of "a consciousness, originally pure, defiled by adventitious impurities.")

A similar view is also defended by Christian Lindtner, who argues that in pre-canonical Buddhism, nirvana is:

... A place one can actually go to. It is called nirvanadhatu, has no border-signs (animitta), is localized somewhere beyond the other six dhatus (beginning with earth and ending with vijñana) but is closest to akasa and vijñana. One cannot visualize it, it is anidarsana, but it provides one with firm ground under one’s feet, it is dhruva; once there one will not slip back, it is acyutapada. As opposed to this world, it is a pleasant place to be in, it is sukha, things work well. (Note: Cited in Wynne (2007, p. 99).)

According to Christian Lindtner, the original and early Buddhist concepts of nirvana were similar to those found in competing Śramaṇa (strivers/ascetics) traditions such as Jainism and the tradition of the Upanishads. It was not a purely psychological idea, but a concept described in terms of Indian cosmology and a related theory of consciousness. All Indian religions, over time, states Lindtner evolved these ideas, internalizing the state but in different ways because early and later Vedanta continued with the metaphysical idea of Brahman and soul, but Buddhism did not. In this view, the canonical Buddhist views on nirvana was a reaction against early (pre-canonical) Buddhism, along with the assumptions of Jainism and the Upanishadic thought on the idea of personal liberation. As a result of this reaction, nirvana came to be seen as a state of mind, instead of a concrete place. Elements of this precanonical Buddhism may have survived the canonisation, and its subsequent filtering out of ideas, and re-appeared in Mahayana Buddhism. According to Lindtner, the existence of multiple, and contradicting ideas, is also reflected in the works of Nagarjuna, who tried to harmonize these different ideas. According to Lindtner, this lead him to taking a "paradoxical" stance, for instance regarding nirvana, rejecting any positive description.

Referring to this view, Alexander Wynne holds that there is no evidence in the Sutta Pitaka that the Buddha held this view, at best it only shows that "some of the early Buddhists were influenced by their Brahminic peers". Wynne concludes that the Buddha rejected the views of the Vedas and that his teachings present a radical departure from these Brahminical beliefs.

=== Nirvana with and without remainder of fuel ===
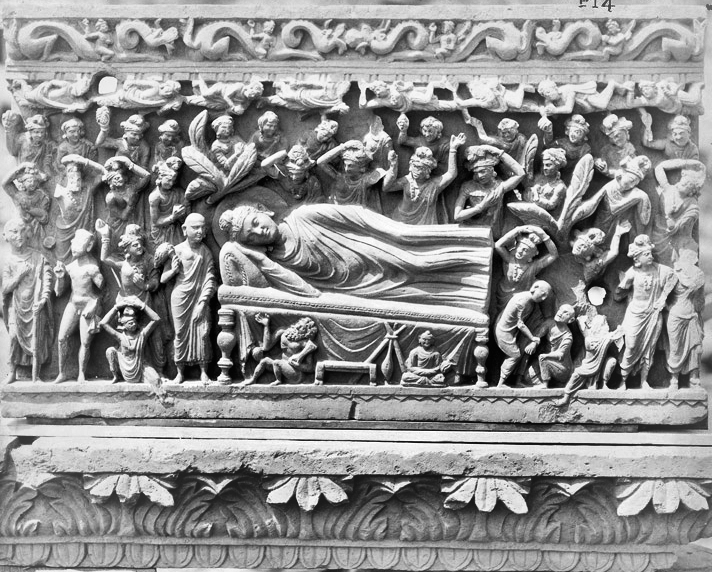
Buddhist sculpture of the final nirvana of the Buddha in greco-buddhist Gandharan style from Loriyan Tangai.

There are two stages in nirvana, one in life, and one final nirvana upon death; the former is imprecise and general, the latter is precise and specific. The nirvana-in-life marks the life of a monk who has attained complete release from desire and suffering but still has a body, name and life. The nirvana-after-death, also called nirvana-without-substrate, is the complete cessation of everything, including consciousness and rebirth. This main distinction is between the extinguishing of the fires during life, and the final "blowing out" at the moment of death: (Note: Nirvana during life and beyond death: Donald Lopez states: "Two types of nirvana are [...] described. The first is called 'nirvana with remainder.' [...] The second type is called 'nirvana without remainder', or final nirvana."; Peter Harvey states: "The first aspect of Nibbana is described as 'with remainder of what is grasped at' (sa-updadi-sesa), meaning that the khandas, the result of past grasping, still remain for him; the second is described as 'without remainder of what is grasped at' (an-upadi-sesa) (It.38-39).)

- Sa-upādisesa-nibbāna (Pali; Sanskrit sopadhiśeṣa-nirvāṇa), "nirvana with remainder", "nirvana with residue." Nirvana is attained during one's life, when the fires are extinguished. There is still the "residue" of the five skandhas, and a "residue of fuel", which however is not "burning". (Note: Rupert Gethin: "Like the Buddha, any person who attains nirvāṇa does not remain thereafter forever absorbed in some transcendental state of mind. On the contrary he or she continues to live in the world; he or she continues to think, speak, and act as other people do—with the difference that all his or her thoughts, words, and deeds are completely free of the motivations of greed, aversion, and delusion, and motivated instead entirely by generosity, friendliness, and wisdom. This condition of having extinguished the defilements can be termed 'nirvāṇa with the remainder [of life]' (sopadhiśeṣa-nirvāṇa/sa-upādisesa-nibbāna): the nirvāṇa that comes from ending the occurrence of the defilements (kleśa/kilesa) of the mind; what the Pali commentaries call for short kilesa-parinibbāna. (Note: Gethin cites: Dhammapada-atthakathā ii. 163; Vibhaṇga-atthakatha 433.) And this is what the Buddha achieved on the night of his awakening.") Nirvana-in-this-life is believed to result in a transformed mind with qualities such as happiness, (Note: In the Dhammapada, the Buddha describes nirvāṇa as "the highest happiness", an enduring happiness qualitatively different from the limited, transitory happiness derived from impermanent things.) freedom of negative mental states, (Note: Freedom from negative states: Walpola Rahula: [one who has achieved nirvana is] "free from all 'complexes' and obsessions, the worries and troubles that torment others."; Damien Keown: "Nirvana [...] involves a radically transformed state of consciousness which is free of the obsession with 'me and mine'."; Rupert Gethin: "Any person who attains nirvāṇa [...] continues to think, speak, and act as other people do—with the difference that all his or her thoughts, words, and deeds are completely free of the motivations of greed, aversion, and delusion, and motivated instead entirely by generosity, friendliness, and wisdom.) peacefulness (Note: Peacefulness: Bhikkhu Bodhi states: "The state of perfect peace that comes when craving is eliminated is Nibbāna (nirvāṇa)."; Joseph Goldstein states: "It is also described as the deathless, absolute peace, freedom, and so forth."; Lama Surya Das states: "Nirvana is inconceivable inner peace, the cessation of craving and clinging."; Walpola Rahula states: "He who has realized the Truth, Nirvāṇa, is (...) joyful, exultant, enjoying the pure life, his faculties pleased, free from anxiety, serene and peaceful." (Note: Rahula cites: Majjhima-nikāya II (PTS), p. 121); Damien Keown states: "It is clear that nirvana-in-this-life is a psychological and ethical reality, a transformed state of personality characterized by peace, deep spiritual joy, compassion, and a refined and subtle awareness. Negative mental states and emotions such as doubt, worry, anxiety, and fear are absent from the enlightened mind. Saints in many religious traditions exhibit some or all of these qualities, and ordinary people also possess them to some degree, although imperfectly developed. An enlightened person, however, such as a Buddha or an Arhat, possesses them all completely.") and non-reactiveness. (Note: Non-reactiveness: Phillip Moffitt states: "Nibbana literally means "cooled" and is analogous to a fire that's no longer burning. Thus, when there is cessation, your mind no longer burns in response to the arising of pleasant and unpleasant in your life; it isn't reactive or controlled by what you like or dislike."; Ringu Tulku explains: "Someone who has attained [...] the state of nirvana, will no longer react within the pattern of aversion and attachment. The way such a person sees things will be nondualistic and therefore non-conceptual. [...] When this dual reaction is gone, nothing is haunting or fearful anymore. We see clearly, and nothing seems imposing, since nothing is imposed from our part. When there is nothing we do not like, there is nothing to fear. Being free from fear, we are peaceful. There is no need to run away from anything, and therefore no need to run after anything either. In this way there is no burden. We can have inner peace, strength, and clarity, almost independent from circumstances and situations. This is complete freedom of mind without any circumstantial entanglement; the state is called "nirvana" [...]. Someone who has reached this state has gone beyond our usual way of being imprisoned in habitual patterns and distorted ways of seeing these things.")
- An-up ādisesa-nibbāna (Pali; Sanskrit nir-upadhiśeṣa-nirvāṇa), "nirvana without remainder," "nirvana without residue". This is the final nirvana, or parinirvana or "blowing out" at the moment of death, when there is no fuel left. (Note: Rupert Gethin: "Eventually 'the remainder of life' will be exhausted and, like all beings, such a person must die. But unlike other beings, who have not experienced 'nirvāṇa', he or she will not be reborn into some new life, the physical and mental constituents of being will not come together in some new existence, there will be no new being or person. Instead of being reborn, the person 'parinirvāṇa-s', meaning in this context that the five aggregates of physical and mental phenomena that constitute a being cease to occur. This is the condition of 'nirvāṇa without remainder [of life]' (nir-upadhiśeṣa-nirvāṇa/an-up ādisesa-nibbāna): nirvāṇa that comes from ending the occurrence of the aggregates (skandha/khandha) of physical and mental phenomena that constitute a being; or, for short, khandha-parinibbāna. Modern Buddhist usage tends to restrict 'nirvāṇa' to the awakening experience and reserve 'parinirvāṇa' for the death experience.")

The classic Pali sutta definitions for these states are as follows:

And what, monks, is the Nibbana element with residue remaining? Here, a monk is an arahant, one whose taints are destroyed, who has lived the holy life, done what had to be done, laid down the burden, reached his own goal, utterly destroyed the fetters of existence, one completely liberated through final knowledge. However, his five sense faculties remain unimpaired, by which he still experiences what is agreeable and disagreeable, still feels pleasure and pain. It is the destruction of lust, hatred, and delusion in him that is called the Nibbana element with residue remaining.

And what, monks, is the Nibbana element without residue remaining? Here, a monk is an arahant ... one completely liberated through final knowledge. For him, here in this very life, all that is felt, not being delighted in, will become cool right here. That, monks, is called the Nibbana element without residue remaining.

Gombrich explains that the five skandhas or aggregates are the bundles of firewood that fuel the three fires. The Buddhist practitioner ought to "drop" these bundles, so that the fires are no longer fueled and "blow out". When this is done, the bundles still remain as long as this life continues, but they are no longer "on fire." Collins notes that the first type, nirvana in this life is also called bodhi (awakening), nirvana of the defilements or kilesa-(pari)nibbana, and arhatship while nirvana after death is also referred to as the nirvana of the Aggregates, khandha-(pari)nibbana.

What happens with one who has reached nirvana after death is an unanswerable question. (Note: Walpola Rahula: "Now another question arises: What happens to the Buddha or an Arahant after his death, parinirvāṇa? This comes under the category of unanswered questions (avyākata). [Samyutta Nikaya IV (PTS), p. 375 f.] Even when the Buddha spoke about this, he indicated that no words in our vocabulary could express what happens to an Arahant after his death. In reply to a Parivrājaka named Vaccha, the Buddha said that terms like 'born' or 'not born' do not apply in the case of an Arahant, because those things—matter, sensation, perception, mental activities, consciousness—with which the terms like 'born' and 'not born' are associated, are completely destroyed and uprooted, never to rise again after his death. [Majjhima Nikaya I (PTS), p. 486].") According to Walpola Rahula, the five aggregates vanish but there does not remain a mere "nothingness." (Note: Walpola Rahula: "An Arahant after his death is often compared to a fire gone out when the supply of wood is over, or to the flame of a lamp gone out when the wick and oil are finished.[Majjhima Nikaya I (PTS), p. 487] Here it should be clearly and distinctly understood, without any confusion, that what is compared to a flame or a fire gone out is not Nirvāṇa, but the 'being' composed of the Five Aggregates who realized Nirvāṇa. This point has to be emphasized because many people, even some great scholars, have misunderstood and misinterpreted this simile as referring to Nirvāṇa. Nirvāṇa is never compared to a fire or a lamp gone out.) Rahula's view, states Gombrich, is not accurate summary of the Buddhist thought, and mirrors the Upanishadic thought. (Note: Richard Gombrich, who studied with Walpola Rahula, notes: "[T]here is one point where the great scholar monk has let us down: his account of nirvana, in Chapter IV, is unclear and, to my mind, even at points self-contradictory [...] In proclaiming (in block capitals) that 'Truth is', Rahula has for a moment fallen into Upanisadic mode.) (Note: In the Yamaka Sutta (SN 22.58), the monk Sariputta teaches that to state that a person who attains nirvana "does not exist" after death is not the correct view; the correct view is that nirvana-after-death is outside of all conceivable experience. The only accurate statement that can be made about nirvana-after-death is "That which is stressful (dukkha; suffering) has ceased and gone to its end." (Note: Yamaka Sutta, SN 22.85.) The Aggivacchagotta Sutta states that the state of being after death cannot be described as either being reborn after death, not being reborn, being and not being reborn, or neither being nor not being reborn. The sutra concludes: "Any fire burning dependent on a sustenance of grass and timber, being unnourished — from having consumed that sustenance and not being offered any other — is classified simply as 'out' (unbound). Even so [...] any physical form by which one describing the Tathagata [the Buddha] would describe him: That the Tathagata has abandoned, its root destroyed, made like a palmyra stump, deprived of the conditions of development, not destined for future arising. Freed from the classification of form [...] the Tathagata is deep, boundless, hard to fathom, like the sea. 'Reappears' doesn't apply. 'Does not reappear' doesn't apply. 'Both does & does not reappear' doesn't apply. 'Neither reappears nor does not reappear' doesn't apply." (Note: Aggi-Vacchagotta Sutta: To Vacchagotta on Fire, by Thanissaro Bhikkhu))

=== Anatta, Sunyata ===
Nirvana is also described in Buddhist texts as identical to anatta (anatman, non-self, lack of any self). Anatta means there is no abiding self or soul in any being or a permanent essence in any thing. This interpretation asserts that all reality is of dependent origination and a worldly construction of each human mind, therefore ultimately a delusion or ignorance. In Buddhist thought, this must be overcome, states Martin Southwold, through "the realization of anatta, which is nirvana".

Nirvana in some Buddhist traditions is described as the realization of sunyata (emptiness or nothingness). Madhyamika Buddhist texts call this as the middle point of all dualities (Middle Way), where all subject-object discrimination and polarities disappear, there is no conventional reality, and the only ultimate reality of emptiness is all that remains.

== Synonyms and metaphors ==
=== A flame which goes out due to lack of fuel ===
A commonly used metaphor for nirvana is that of a flame which goes out due to lack of fuel:

Just as an oil-lamp burns because of oil and wick, but when the oil and wick are exhausted, and no others are supplied, it goes out through lack of fuel (anaharo nibbayati), so the [enlightened] monk … knows that after the break-up of his body, when further life is exhausted, all feelings which are rejoiced in here will become cool.

Collins argues that the Buddhist view of awakening reverses the Vedic view and its metaphors. While in Vedic religion, the fire is seen as a metaphor for the good and for life, Buddhist thought uses the metaphor of fire for the three poisons and for suffering. This can be seen in the Adittapariyaya Sutta commonly called "the fire sermon" as well as in other similar early Buddhist texts. The fire sermon describes the end of the "fires" with a refrain which is used throughout the early texts to describe nibbana:

Disenchanted, he becomes dispassionate. Through dispassion, he is fully released. With full release, there is the knowledge, 'Fully released.' He discerns that 'Birth is ended, the holy life fulfilled, the task done. There is nothing further for this world.

=== An end state, where many adverse aspects of experience have ceased ===
In the Dhammacakkapavattanasutta, the third noble truth of cessation (associated with nirvana) is defined as: "the fading away without remainder and cessation of that same craving, giving it up, relinquishing it, letting it go, not clinging to it."

Steven Collins lists some examples of synonyms used throughout the Pali texts for Nirvana:

the end, (the place, state) without corruptions, the truth, the further (shore), the subtle, very hard to see, without decay, firm, not liable to dissolution, incomparable, without differentiation, peaceful, deathless, excellent, auspicious, rest, the destruction of craving, marvellous, without affliction, whose nature is to be free from affliction, nibbana [presumably here in one or more creative etymology, = e.g., non-forest], without trouble, dispassion, purity, freedom, without attachment, the island, shelter (cave), protection, refuge, final end, the subduing of pride (or ‘intoxication’), elimination of thirst, destruction of attachment, cutting off of the round (of rebirth), empty, very hard to obtain, where there is no becoming, without misfortune, where there is nothing made, sorrowfree, without danger, whose nature is to be without danger, profound, hard to see, superior, unexcelled (without superior), unequalled, incomparable, foremost, best, without strife, clean, flawless, stainless, happiness, immeasurable, (a firm) standing point, possessing nothing.

== In the Theravada School ==
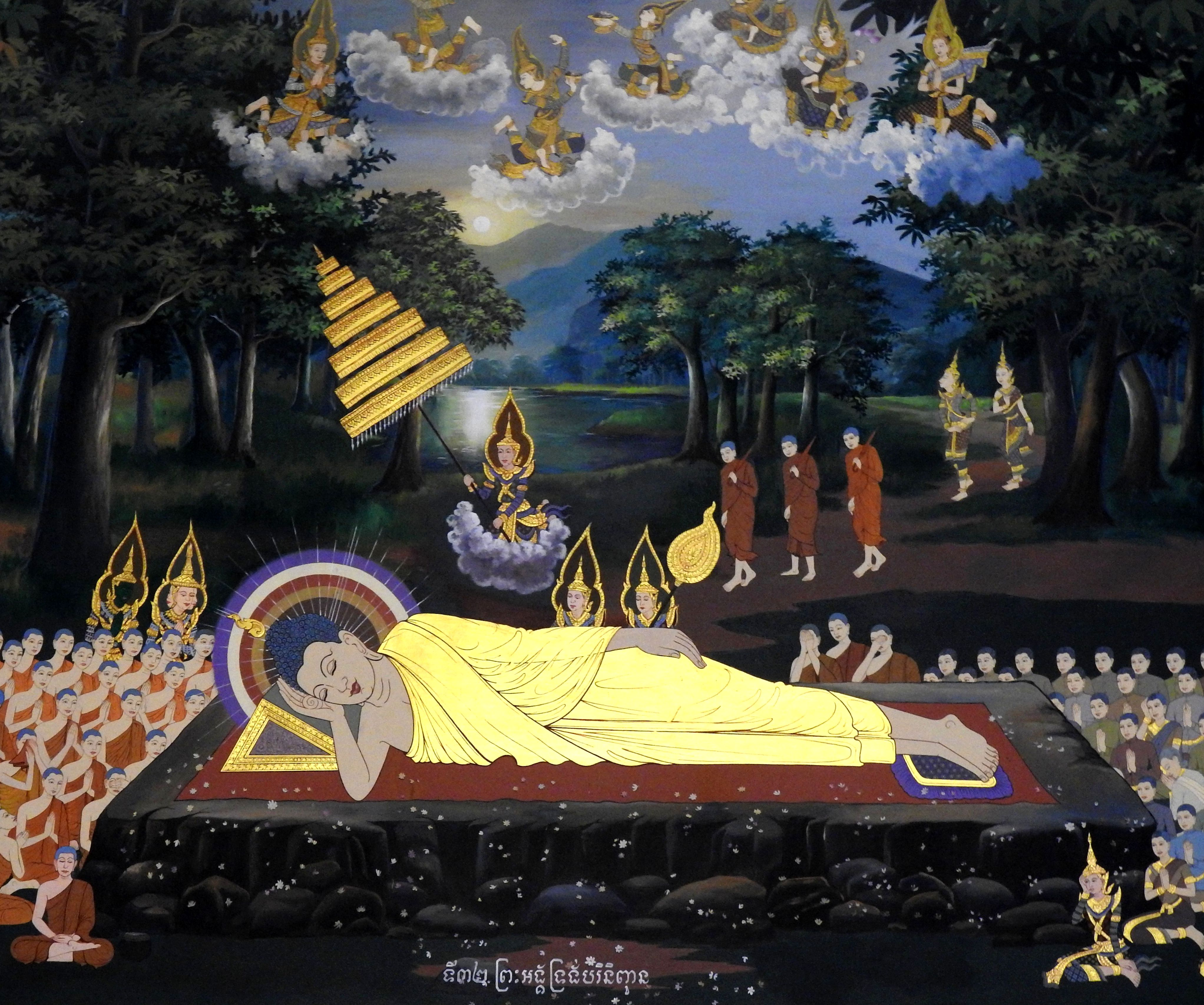
Khmer traditional mural painting depicts Gautama Buddha entering parinirvana, Dharma assembly pavilion, Wat Botum, Phnom Penh, Cambodia.

=== In the Theravada Abhidhamma ===
In the Theravada tradition's Abhidhamma texts, nibbāna is regarded as an uncompounded or unconditioned (asankhata) dhamma (phenomenon, event) which is "transmundane", (Note: According to Peter Harvey, the Theravada-tradition tends to minimize mystical tendencies, but there is also a tendency to stress the complete otherness of nirvana from samsara. The Pāli Canon provides good grounds for this minimalistic approach, bit it also contains material suggestive of a Vijnavada-type interpretation of nirvāṇa, namely as a radical transformation of consciousness.) and which is beyond our normal dualistic conceptions. (Note: Walpola Rahula: "Nirvāṇa is beyond all terms of duality and relativity. It is therefore beyond our conceptions of good and evil, right and wrong, existence and non-existence. Even the word 'happiness' (sukha) which is used to describe Nirvāṇa has an entirely different sense here. Sāriputta once said: 'O friend, Nirvāṇa is happiness! Nirvāṇa is happiness!' Then Udāyi asked: 'But, friend Sāriputta, what happiness can it be if there is no sensation?' Sāriputta's reply was highly philosophical and beyond ordinary comprehension: "That there is no sensation itself is happiness'.")

In Abhidhamma texts like the Vibhanga, nibbana or the asankhata-dhatu (unconditioned element) is defined thus:

‘What is the unconditioned element (asankhata dhatu)? It is the cessation of passion, the cessation of hatred and the cessation of delusion. (Note: See, for instance, the "Snake-Simile Discourse" (MN 22), where the Buddha states: "Monks, this Teaching so well proclaimed by me, is plain, open, explicit, free of patchwork. In this Teaching that is so well proclaimed by me and is plain, open, explicit and free of patchwork; for those who are arahants, free of taints, who have accomplished and completed their task, have laid down the burden, achieved their aim, severed the fetters binding to existence, who are liberated by full knowledge, there is no (future) round of existence that can be ascribed to them.)

The Dhammasangani likewise describes the asankhata dhatu as that reality which is a sphere of experience unproduced by any cause or condition according to L.S. Cousins. The Dhammasangani describes it in numerous ways, such as immeasurable, superior to everything, as not past, present or future, as neither arisen nor not-arisen and as neither within nor without. Cousins also notes that "suggestively, however, it may be reckoned as nama (name) rather than rupa. This does seem to suggest some element of underlying idealism of the kind which emerges later in the vijñanavada."

Furthermore, for the Theravada, nibbana is uniquely the only asankhata dhamma (unconditioned phenomenon) and they argue that nibbana is unitary (cannot be divided). Unlike other schools, they do not recognize different unconditioned phenomena or different types of nirvana (such as the apratistha or non-abiding nirvana of Mahayana).

As noted by Thiện Châu, the Theravadins and the Pudgalavadins "remained strictly faithful to the letter of the sutras" and thus held that nirvana is the only unconditioned dhamma, while other schools also posited various asankhata dhammas (such as the Sarvastivadin view that space or ākāśa was unconditioned).

=== Medieval Theravada exegetes ===
The fifth century Theravada exegete Buddhaghosa says, in his Visuddhimagga (Path of Purification):

It is called nibbana (extinction) because it has gone away from (nikkhanta), has escaped from (nissata), is dissociated from, craving, which has acquired in common usage the name ‘fastening (vana)’ because, by ensuring successive becoming, craving serves as a joining together, a binding together, a lacing together, of the four kinds of generation, five destinies, seven stations of consciousness and nine abodes of being. (Note: Both the stream-enterer and the once-returner abandon the first three fetters. What distinguishes these stages is that the once-returner additionally attenuates lust, hate and delusion, and will necessarily be reborn only once more.)

Buddhaghosa also criticizes the view that nibbāna is a kind of non-existence or an absence (of the five aggregates). He argues that nibbāna is "apprehendable [by some, namely, the nobles ones] by the [right] means, in other words, by the way that is appropriate to it, [the way of virtue, concentration, and understanding]." Buddhaghosa also argues that if nibbana were a mere absence or a nothingness, it would follow that the Buddhist path would be meaningless.

According to Buddhaghosa, nibbāna is achieved after a long process of committed application to the path of purification, a gradual training extending often over a number of years. To be committed to this path already requires that a seed of wisdom is present in the individual. This wisdom becomes manifest in the experience of awakening (bodhi). Attaining nibbāna, in either the current or some future birth, depends on effort, and is not pre-determined. In the Visuddhimagga, chapter I.v.6, Buddhaghosa identifies various options within the Pali canon for pursuing a path to nirvana. (Note: A number of the suttas referenced below as well as Buddhaghosa himself refer not explicitly to nirvana but to "the path of purification" (Pali: Visuddhimagga). In Visuddhimagga, Ch. I, v. 5, Buddhaghosa notes: "Herein, purification should be understood as nibbana, which being devoid of all stains, is utterly pure") (Note: These include: 1. By insight (vipassana) alone (Note: See Dh. 277, and "Maggavagga: The Path". Translated by Acharya Buddharakkhita. 1996 – via accesstoinsight.org. In the Paramattha-mañjūsā (the Visuddhimagga commentary), vv. 9-10, it adds the following caveat regarding this option of "insight alone": "The words 'insight alone' are meant to exclude, not virtue, etc., but serenity (i.e., jhana), [...] [as typically reflected] in the pair, serenity and insight [...] The word 'alone' actually excludes only that concentration with distinction [of jhanic absorption]; for concentration is classed as both access [or momentary] and absorption [...] Taking this stanza as the teaching for one whose vehicle is insight does not imply that there is no concentration; for no insight comes about with momentary concentration. And again, insight should be understood as the three contemplations of impermanence, pain and not-self [see tilakkhana]; not contemplation of impermanence alone".); 2. By jhana and understanding (see Dh. 372); 3. by deeds, vision and righteousness (see MN iii.262) (Note: "Anathapindikovada Sutta: Instructions to Anathapindika". Translated by Acharya Buddharakkhita. 2003 – via accesstoinsight.org. Verse 262 of this sutta is translated as: "Action, clear-knowing, & mental qualities, virtue, the highest [way of] life: through this are mortals purified, not through clan or wealth.); 4. By virtue, consciousness and understanding (7SN i.13); (Note: The option expressed by SN i.13 is the basis for the entire rest of the Visuddhimagga's exposition. It is the very first paragraph of the Visuddhimagga and states: "When a wise man, established well in virtue, develops consciousness and understanding, then as a bhikku ardent and sagacious, he succeeds in disentangling this tangle. In the Visuddhimagga, Ch. I, verse 2, Buddhaghosa comments that this tangle refers to "the network of craving." In verse 7, Buddhaghosa states that develops consciousness and understanding means "develops both concentration and insight."); 5. by virtue, understanding, concentration and effort; (Note: SN i.53) Ñāṇamoli translate SN i.53 as: "He who is possessed of constant virtue, who has understanding, and is concentrated, who is strenuous and diligent as well, will cross the flood so difficult to cross.); 6. By the four foundations of mindfulness. (Note: "Maha-satipatthana Sutta: The Great Frames of Reference". Translated by Thanissaro Bhikkhu. 2000 – via accesstoinsight.org. Verse 290 of this sutta is translated as: "The Blessed One said this: "This is the direct path for the purification of beings, for the overcoming of sorrow & lamentation, for the disappearance of pain & distress, for the attainment of the right method, & for the realization of Unbinding—in other words, the four frames of reference."")) According to Gombrich, this proliferation of possible paths to liberation reflects later doctrinal developments, and a growing emphasis on insight as the main liberative means, instead of the practice of dhyana.

Another influential Pali commentator, Dhammapala, also discussed nibbana in his Udana Commentary (Udanatthakatha). According to Dhammapala, nibbana is an objective reality which is the opposite of samsara. Nibbana has its own nature (sabhava) which is unlike all conditioned phenomena.

=== Stages of the path to nibbana ===
The four stages of awakening according to the Sutta Piṭaka
| Outcome | Further rebirths | Abandoned fetters | |
|---|---|---|---|
| stream-enterer (sotāpanna) | up to seven, in earthly or heavenly realms | 1. identity view 2. doubt in Buddha; 3. clinging to rites; and ritual | lower fetters |
| once-returner (sakadagami) | one more, as a human | 1. identity view 2. doubt in Buddha; 3. clinging to rites; and ritual | lower fetters |
| non-returner (anāgāmi) | one more, in a pure abode | 4. sensual desire 5. ill will | lower fetters |
| arahant | none | 6. desire for; material rebirth 7. desire for immaterial rebirth 8. conceit 9. restlessness 10. ignorance | higher fetters |

The Theravada tradition identifies four progressive stages. (Note: These four stages are: Stream-enterer (Sotapanna), Once returner (Sakadagami), Non-returner (Anagami), Worthy one (Arhat)) The first three lead to favorable rebirths in more pleasant realms of existence, while the last culminates in nirvana as an Arahat who is a fully awakened person. The first three are reborn because they still have some of the fetters, while arhat has abandoned all ten fetters and, upon death will never be reborn in any realm or world, having wholly escaped saṃsāra.

At the start, a monk's mind treats nirvana as an object (nibbanadhatu). This is followed by realizing the insight of three universal lakshana (marks): impermanence (anicca), suffering (dukkha) and nonself (anatman). Thereafter the monastic practice aims at eliminating the ten fetters that lead to rebirth.

According to Thanissaro Bhikkhu, individuals up to the level of non-returning may experience nibbāna as an object of consciousness. (Note: See for example: "Jhana Sutta: Mental Absorption". Translated by Thanissaro Bhikkhu. 1997 – via accesstoinsight.org.) Certain contemplations with nibbāna as an object of samādhi lead, if developed, to the level of non-returning. At that point of contemplation, which is reached through a progression of insight, if the meditator realizes that even that state is constructed and therefore impermanent, the fetters are destroyed, arahantship is attained, and nibbāna is realized.

=== Modern Theravada views ===
K.N. Jayatilleke, a modern Sri Lankan Buddhist philosopher, holds that nirvana must be understood by a careful study of the Pali texts. Jayatilleke argues that the Pali works show that nirvana means 'extinction' as well as 'the highest positive experience of happiness'. Jayatilleke writes that despite the definition of nirvana as 'extinction', this does not mean that it is a kind of annihilation or a state of dormant nonentity, for this contradicts the statements of the Buddha that reject this interpretation. Jayatilleke holds that the early texts clearly proclaim that nothing can be said about the state of the Buddha after paranibbana (the end of his psycho-physical personality) because "we do not have the concepts or words to describe adequately the state of the emancipated person." This transcendent reality which our normal minds cannot grasp is not located in time or space, it is not causally conditioned, and beyond existence and non-existence. Because trying to explain nibbana by means of logic is impossible, the only thing to be done is to explain how to reach it, instead of dwelling on what it "is". Explaining what happens to the Buddha after nibbana is thus said to be an unanswerable.

A similarly apophatic position is also defended by Walpola Rahula, who states that the question of what nirvana is "can never be answered completely and satisfactorily in words, because human language is too poor to express the real nature of the Absolute Truth or Ultimate Reality which is Nirvana." Rahula affirms that nibbana is most often described in negative terms because there is less danger in grasping at these terms, such as "the cessation of continuity and becoming (bhavanirodha)", "the abandoning and destruction of desire and craving for these five aggregates of attachment", and "the extinction of "thirst" (tanhakkhayo)." Rahula also affirms however that nibbana is not a negative or an annihilation, because there is no self to be annihilated and because 'a negative word does not necessarily indicate a negative state'. Rahula also notes that more positive terms are used to describe nibbana such as "freedom" (mutti) and "truth" (sacca). Rahula also agrees that nirvana is unconditioned.

The American Theravada monk Bhikkhu Bodhi has defended the traditional Theravada view which sees nirvana as "a reality transcendent to the entire world of mundane experience, a reality transcendent to all the realms of phenomenal existence."

The Sri Lankan philosopher David Kalupahana has taken a different position, he argues that the Buddha's "main philosophical insight" is the principle of causality (dependent origination) and that this "is operative in all spheres, including the highest state of spiritual development, namely, nirvana." According to Kalupahana "later scholars attempted to distinguish two spheres, one in which causation prevailed and the other which is uncaused. This latter view was, no doubt, the result of a confusion in the meanings of the two terms, sankhata ('compounded') and paticcasamuppanna ('causally conditioned')." Thus, even though nibbana is termed "asankhata" (un-compounded, not-put together) there is no statement in the early texts which say that nirvana is not dependently originated or is uncaused (the term would be appaticcasamuppana). He thus argues that "nirvana is a state where there is 'natural or causal happening' (paticcasamuppada), but not 'organized,' or 'planned' conditioning (sankha-rana)", as well as "a state of perfect mental health (aroga), of perfect happiness (parama sukha), calmness or coolness (sitibhuta), and stability (aneñja), etc. attained in this life, or while one is alive."

Mahasi Sayadaw, one of the most influential 20th century Theravada vipassana teachers, states in his "On the nature of Nibbana" that "nibbana is perfect peace (santi)" and "the complete annihilation of the three cycles of defilement, action, and result of action, which all go to create mind and matter, volitional activities, etc." He further states that for arahants "no new life is formed after his decease-consciousness." Mahasi Sayadaw further states that nibbana is the cessation of the five aggregates which is like "a flame being extinguished". However this doesn't mean that "an arahant as an individual has disappeared" because there is no such thing as an "individual" in an ultimate sense, even though we use this term conventionally. Ultimate however, "there is only a succession of mental and physical phenomena arising and dissolving." For this reason, Mahasi Sayadaw holds that although for an arahant "cessation means the extinction of the successive rise and fall of the aggregates" this is not the view of annihilation (uccheda-diṭṭhi) since there is ultimately no individual to be annihilated. Mahasi further notes that "feeling [vedana] ceases with the parinibbāna of the Arahant" and also that "the cessation of senses is nibbāna" (citing the Pañcattaya Sutta). Mahasi also affirms that even though nibbana is the "cessation of mind, matter, and mental formations" and even the cessation of "formless consciousness", it is not nothing, but it is an "absolute reality" and he also affirms that "the peace of nibbana is real."

=== Unorthodox interpretations, nibbana as citta, viññana or atta ===
In Thai Theravada, as well as among some modern Theravada scholars, there are alternative interpretations which differ from the traditional orthodox Theravada view. These interpretations see nibbana as equivalent in some way with either a special kind of mind (pabhassara citta) or a special consciousness called anidassana viññāṇa, "non-manifest" consciousness which is said to be 'luminous'. In one interpretation, the "luminous consciousness" is identical with nibbana. Others disagree, finding it to be not nibbana itself, but instead to be a kind of consciousness accessible only to arahants.

Some teachers of the Thai forest tradition, such as Ajahn Maha Bua taught an idea called "original mind" which when perfected is said to exist as a separate reality from the world and the aggregates. According to Maha Bua, the indestructible mind or citta is characterized by awareness or knowing, which is intrinsically bright (pabhassaram) and radiant, and though it is tangled or "darkened" in samsara, it is not destroyed. This mind is unconditioned, deathless and an independent reality. According to Bua, this mind is impure, but when it is purified of the defilements, it remains abiding in its own foundation. Maha Bua also publicly argued (in a newspaper in 1972) that one could meet with and discuss the teachings with arahants and Buddhas of the past (and that Ajahn Mun had done so) therefore positing that nibbana is a kind of higher existence. Prayudh Payutto, a modern scholar-monk who is widely seen as the most influential authority on Buddhist doctrine in Thailand, has played a prominent role in arguing against the views of Maha Bua, strictly basing his views on the Pali canon to refute such notions.

Ajahns Pasanno and Amaro, contemporary western monastics in the Thai forest tradition, note that these ideas are rooted in a passage in the Anguttara Nikaya (1.61-62) which mentions a certain "pabhassara citta". Citing another passage from the canon which mentions a "consciousness that is signless, boundless, all-luminous" (called anidassana viññāṇa) they state that this "must mean a knowing of a primordial, transcendent nature." (Note: Ajahn Pasanno and Ajahn Amaro: "The Buddha avoided the nit-picking pedantry of many philosophers contemporary with him and opted for a more broad-brush, colloquial style, geared to particular listeners in a language which they could understand. Thus 'viññana' here can be assumed to mean 'knowing' but not the partial, fragmented, discriminative (vi-) knowing (-ñana) which the word usually implies. Instead it must mean a knowing of a primordial, transcendent nature, otherwise the passage which contains it would be self-contradictory." They then give further context for why this choice of words may have been made; the passages may represent an example of the Buddha using his "skill in means" to teach Brahmins in terms they were familiar with.)

A related view of nibbana has been defended by the American Thai forest monk Thanissaro Bhikkhu. According to Thanissaro, "non-manifestive consciousness" (anidassana viññāṇa) differs from the kinds of consciousness associated to the six sense media, which have a "surface" that they fall upon and arise in response to. In a liberated individual, this is directly experienced, in a way that is free from any dependence on conditions at all. In Thanissaro's view, the luminous, unsupported consciousness associated with nibbana is directly known by noble ones without the mediation of the mental consciousness factor in dependent co-arising, and is the transcending of all objects of mental consciousness. The British academic Peter Harvey has defended a similar view of nibbana as anidassana viññāṇa.

According to Paul Williams, there is also a trend in modern Thai Theravada that argues that "nirvana is indeed the true Self (Atman; Pali: atta)". This dispute began when the 12th Supreme Patriarch of Thailand published a book of essays in 1939 arguing that while the conditioned world is anatta, nibbana is atta. According to Williams, this interpretation echoes the Mahayana tathāgatagarbha sutras. This position was criticized by Buddhadasa Bhikkhu, who argued that the not-self (anatta) perspective is what makes Buddhism unique. Fifty years after this dispute, the Dhammakaya Movement also began to teach that nibbana is not anatta, but the "true self" or dhammakaya. According to Williams, this dhammakaya (dharma body) is "a luminous, radiant and clear Buddha figure free of all defilements and situated within the body of the meditator." This view has been strongly criticized as "insulting the Buddha’s teaching" and "showing disrespect to the Pali canon" by Prayudh Payutto (In his The Dhammakaya case) and this has led to fervent debates in Thai Buddhist circles.

A related idea, which finds no explicit support in the Pali Canon without interpretation, and is the product of contemporary Theravada practice tradition, despite its absence in the Theravada commentaries and Abhidhamma, is that the mind of the arahant is itself nibbāna. (Note: There is a clear reference in the Anguttara Nikaya to a "luminous mind" present within all people, be they corrupt or pure, whether or not it itself is pure or impure.) The Canon does not support the identification of the "luminous mind" with nirvanic consciousness, though it plays a role in the realization of nirvāṇa. Upon the destruction of the fetters, according to one scholar, "the shining nibbanic consciousness flashes out" of it, "being without object or support, so transcending all limitations."

Another western monastic in the Thai forest tradition, Ajahn Brahmāli, has recently written against all of these views, drawing on a careful study of the Nikāyas. Brahmāli concludes that the "most reasonable interpretation" of final nibbāna is "no more than the cessation of the five khandhas." Brahmāli also notes that there is a kind of samādhi that is attainable only by the awakened and is based on their knowledge of nibbana (but is not nibbana itself), this meditation is what is being referred to by terms such as non-manifest consciousness (anidassana viññāṇa) and unestablished consciousness (appatiṭṭhita viññāṇa).

Bhante Sujato has written extensively to refute this idea as well.

== In other Buddhist schools ==
=== Sthavira schools ===
The later Buddhist Abhidharma schools gave different meaning and interpretations of the term, moving away from the original metaphor of the extinction of the "three fires". The Sarvastivada Abhidharma compendium, the Mahavibhasasastra, says of nirvana:

As it is the cessation of defilements (klesanirodha), it is called nirvana. As it is the extinction of the triple fires, it is called nirvana. As it is the tranquility of three characteristics, it is called nirvana. As there is separation (viyoga) from bad odor (durgandha), it is called nirvana. As there is separation from destinies (gati), it is called nirvana. Vana means forest and nir means escape. As it is the escape from the forest of the aggregates, it is called nirvana. Vana means weaving and nir means negation. As there is no weaving, it is called nirvana. In a way that one with thread can easily be woven while one without that cannot be woven, in that way one with action (karma) and defilements (klesa) can easily be woven into life and death while an asaiksa who is without any action and defilements cannot be woven into life and death. That is why it is called nirvana. Vana means new birth and nir means negation. As there is no more new birth, it is called nirvana. Vana means bondage and nir means separation. As it is separation from bondage, it is called nirvana. Vana means all discomforts of life and death and nir means passing beyond. As it passes beyond all discomforts of life and death, it is called nirvana.

According to Soonil Hwang, the Sarvastivada school held that there were two kinds of nirodha (extinction), extinction without knowledge (apratisamkhyanirodha) and extinction through knowledge (pratisamkhyanirodha), which is the equivalent of nirvana. In the Sarvastivada Abhidharma, extinction through knowledge was equivalent to nirvana, and was defined by its intrinsic nature (svabhava), ‘all extinction which is disjunction (visamyoga)’. This dharma is defined by the Abhidharmakosha as "a special understanding, the penetration (pratisamkhyana) of suffering and the other noble truths." Soonil explains the Sarvastivada view of nirvana as "the perpetual separation of an impure dharma from a series of aggregates through the antidote, ‘acquisition of disjunction’ (visamyogaprapti)." Because the Sarvastivadins held that all dharmas exist in the three times, they saw the destruction of defilements as impossible and thus "the elimination of a defilement is referred to as a ‘separation’ from the series." Soonil adds:

That is to say, the acquisition of the defilement is negated, or technically ‘disjoined’ (visamyoga), through the power of knowledge that terminates the junction between that defilement and the series of aggregates. By reason of this separation, then, there arises ‘the acquisition of disjunction’ (visamyogaprapti) that serves as an antidote (pratipaksa), which henceforward prevents the junction between the defilement and this series.

The Sarvastivadins also held that nirvana was a real existent (dravyasat) which perpetually protects a series of dharmas from defilements in the past, present and future. Their interpretation of nirvana became an issue of debate between them and the Sautrantika school. For the Sautrantikas, nirvana "was not a real existent but a mere designation (prajñaptisat) and was non-existence succeeding existence (pascadabhava)." It is something merely spoken of conventionally, without an intrinsic nature (svabhava). The Abhidharmakosha, explaining the Sautrantika view of nirvana, states:

The extinction through knowledge is, when latent defilements (anusaya) and life (janman) that have already been produced are extinguished, non-arising of further such by the power of knowledge (pratisamkhya).

Thus for the Sautrantikas, nirvana was simply the "non-arising of further latent defilement when all latent defilements that have been produced have already been extinguished." Meanwhile, the Pudgalavada school interpreted nirvana as the single Absolute truth which constitutes "the negation, absence, cessation of all that constitutes the world in which we live, act and suffer". According to Thiện Châu, for the Pudgalavadins, nirvana is seen as totally different than the compounded realm, since it the uncompounded (asamskrta) realm where no compounded things exist, and it is also beyond reasoning and expression. One of the few surviving Pudgalavada texts defines nirvana as:

Absolute truth is the definitive cessation of all activities of speech (vac) and of all thoughts (citta). Activity is bodily action (kayakarman): speech (vac) is that of the voice (vakkarman); thought is that of the mind (manaskarman). If these three (actions) cease definitively, that is absolute truth which is Nirvana.

=== Comparison of the major Sthavira school positions ===
| | Early Buddhist | Classical Theravāda | Sarvāstivāda-Vaibhāṣika | Sautrāntika | Pudgalavāda |
|---|---|---|---|---|---|
| Conception of nirvana or the asankhata | The cessation of the triple fires of passion, hatred and delusion. | Existing separately (patiyekka) from mere destruction | A real existent (dravya) | Non-existence, a mere designation (prajñapti) | A real existent different than samsara |
| The "fuel" or "remainder" (upādi) | The five aggregates | The five aggregates | Life faculty (jivitendriya) and homogeneous character of the group (nikayasabhaga) | Momentum (avedha) of the series of aggregates | The five aggregates |
| Nirvana with a remainder of clinging | The cessation of the triple fires of passion hatred and delusion. | The cessation of defilements (kilesa) | The disjunction (visamyoga) from all impure (sasrava) dharmas | Non-arising of further latent defilements (anusaya) | The cessation of defilements (klesa) |
| Nirvana without a remainder of clinging | The cessation of the five aggregates. Its ontological status is an unanswerable (avyākata). | The cessation of the five aggregates | The disintegration of the series of aggregates | Non-arising of further life (janman) | The cessation of the aggregates. The pudgala (person) cannot actually be said to be existent nor non-existent and it is neither the same nor different than nirvana. |

=== Mahāsāṃghika ===
According to Andre Bareau, the Mahāsāṃghika school held that the nirvana reached by arhats was fundamentally inferior to that of the Buddhas. Regarding the nirvana reached by the Buddha, they held that his longevity (ayu), his body (rupa, sarira) and divine power (tejas) were infinite, unlimited and supramundane (lokuttara). Therefore, they held to a kind of docetism which posited that Buddhas only appear to be born into the world and thus when they die and enter nirvana, this is only a fiction. In reality, the Buddha remains in the form of a body of enjoyment (sambhogakaya) and continues to create many forms (nirmana) adapted to the different needs of beings in order to teach them through clever means (upaya).

According to Guang Xing, Mahāsāṃghikas held that there were two aspects of a Buddha's attainment: the true Buddha who is omniscient and omnipotent, and the manifested forms through which he liberates sentient beings through his skillful means. For the Mahāsāṃghikas, the historical Gautama Buddha was merely one of these transformation bodies (Skt. nirmāṇakāya).

Bareau also writes that for the Mahāsāṃghika school, only wisdom (prajña) can reach nirvana, not samadhi. Bareau notes that this might be the source of the prajñaparamita sutras.

Regarding the Ekavyāvahārika branch of the Mahāsāṃghikas, Bareau states that both samsara and nirvana were nominal designations (prajñapti) and devoid of any real substance. According to Nalinaksha Dutt, for the Ekavyāvahārika, all dharmas are conventional and thus unreal (even the absolute was held to be contingent or dependent) while for the Lokottaravada branch, worldly dharmas are unreal but supramundane dharmas like nirvana are real.

== In Mahayana Buddhism ==
The Mahāyāna (Great Vehicle) tradition, which promotes the bodhisattva path as the highest spiritual ideal over the goal of arhatship, envisions different views of nirvāṇa than the Nikaya Buddhist schools. (Note: Rupert Gethin: The Mahāyāna sūtras express two basic attitudes towards [the nirvana of the Lesser Vehicle]. The first [attitude] is that the path of the disciple [sravaka] and the path of the pratyeka-buddha do lead to a kind of awakening, a release from suffering, nirvāna, and as such are real goals. These goals are, however, inferior and should be renounced for the superior attainment of buddhahood. The second attitude, classically articulated by the Lotus Sūtra, sees the goal of the disciple and the pratyeka-buddha as not true goals at all. (Note: Gethin footnote: Also Śrīmālādevī 78–94; and Lankāvatāra Sūtra 63; cf. Herbert V. Guenther (trans.), The Jewel Ornament of Liberation (London, 1970), 4–6.) The fact that the Buddha taught them is an example of his 'skill in means' (upaya-kauśalya) as a teacher. (Note: Gethin footnote: On the notion of 'skill in means' see Michael Pye, Skilful Means (London, 1978); Williams (2008), pp. 143–150.) These goals are thus merely clever devices (upāya) employed by the Buddha in order to get beings to at least begin the practice of the path; eventually their practice must lead on to the one and only vehicle (eka-yāna) that is the mahāyāna, the vehicle ending in perfect buddhahood.) (Note: The Tibetan teacher Pabongka Rinpoche presents the path in three levels (or scopes. The first stage indicates a level of understanding or ethical conduct for non-Buddhists, and the second two stages are nirvana and Buddhahood. Pabongka Rinpoche: "The subject matter of these teachings can be included in the various paths of the three scopes. The small scope covers the causes to achieve the high rebirth states of the gods and humans: the ethics of abandoning the ten nonvirtues, etc. The medium scope includes the practices that will cause one to gain the definite excellence of liberation— such practices as abandoning [the first two of the] four truths, engaging in [the last two of these truths], and the practice of the three high trainings. The great scope contains the practices that bring about the definite excellence of omniscience— such practices as the development of bodhichitta, the six perfections, etc. Hence, all this subject matter forms a harmonious practice that will take a person to enlightenment and should be understood as being completely without contradiction.") Mahāyāna Buddhism is a diverse group of various Buddhist traditions and therefore there is no single unified Mahāyāna view on nirvāṇa. However, it is generally believed that remaining in saṃsāra in order to help other beings is a noble goal for a Mahāyānist. According to Paul Williams, there are at least two conflicting models on the bodhisattva's attitude to nirvāṇa.

The first model seems to be promoted in the Pañcaviṃśatisāhasrikā Prajñāpāramitā Sūtra and it states that a bodhisattva postpones their nirvāṇa until they have saved numerous sentient beings, then, after reaching Buddhahood, a bodhisattva passes on to cessation just like an arhat (and thus ceases to help others). In this model, their only difference to an arhat is that they have spent aeons helping other beings and have become a Buddha to teach the Dharma. This model seems to have been influential in the early period of Indian Buddhism. Etienne Lamotte, in his analysis of the Mahāprajñāpāramitopadeśa, notes that this text also supports the idea that after entering complete nirvāṇa (parinirvāṇa), a bodhisattva is "able to do nothing more for gods or for men" and therefore he seeks to obtain "wisdom similar to but slightly inferior to that of the Buddhas, which allows him to remain for a long time in saṃsāra in order to dedicate himself to salvific activity by many and varied skillful means."

The second model is one which does not teach that one must postpone nirvāṇa. This model eventually developed a comprehensive theory of nirvāṇa taught by the Yogacara school and later Indian Mahāyāna, which states there are at least two kinds of nirvāṇa, the nirvāṇa of an arhat and a superior type of nirvāṇa called apratiṣṭhita (non-abiding).

=== Apratiṣṭhita nirvāna ===
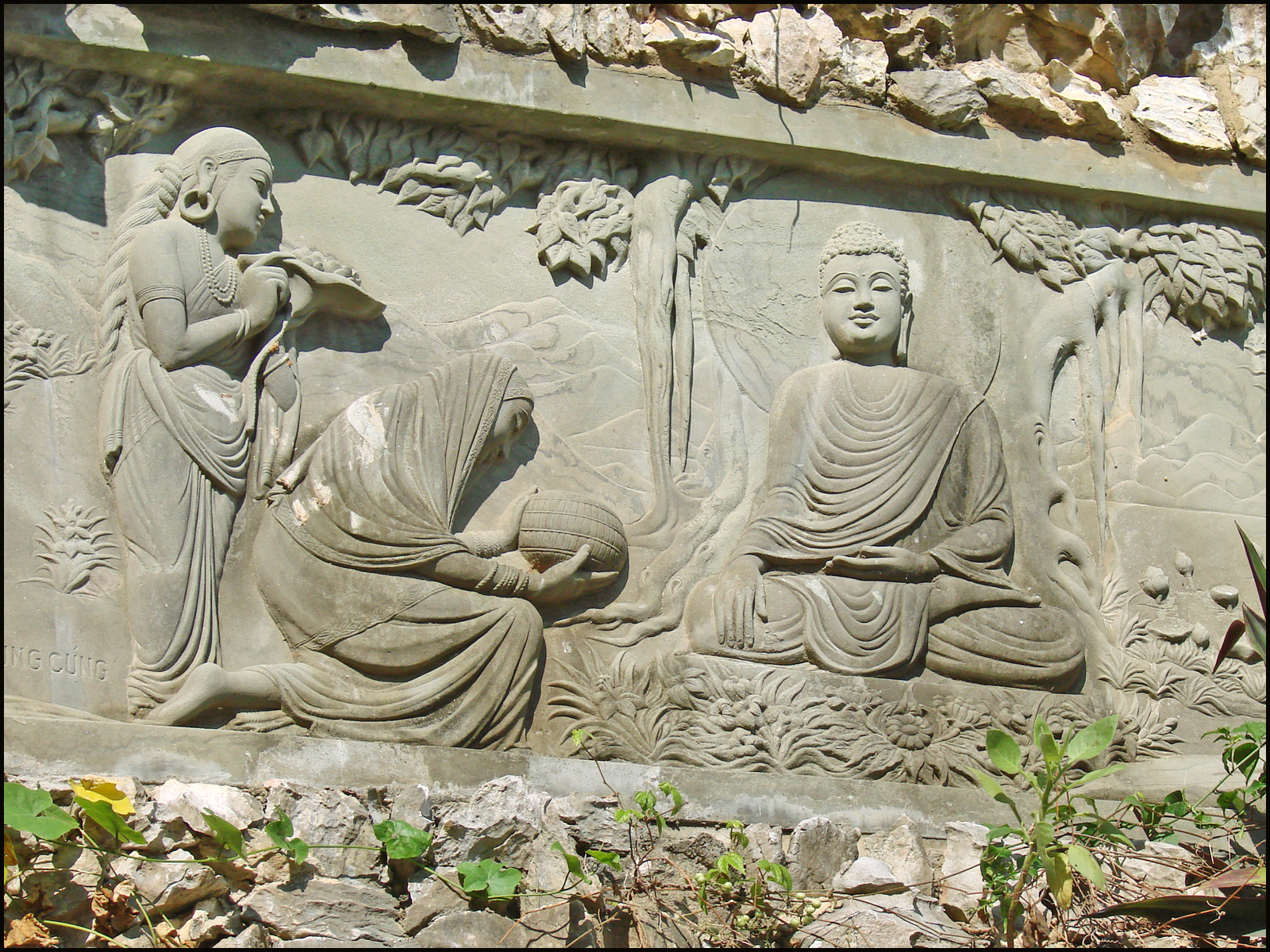
The Buddha's quest for nirvana, a relief in Vietnam

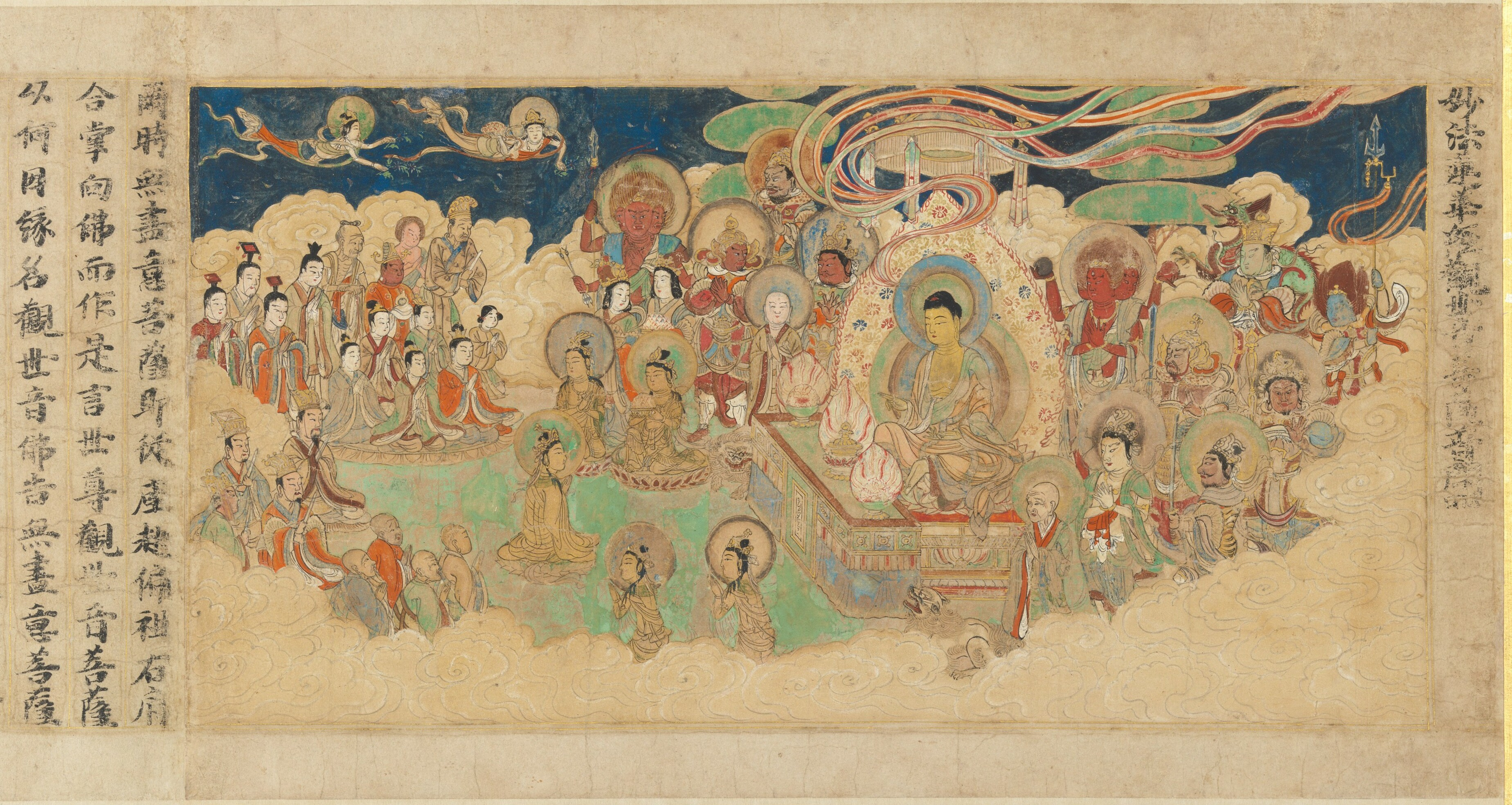
Illustrated Lotus Sūtra scroll, “Universal Gateway,” Chapter 25 of the Lotus Sutra.

The classic Mahāyāna Yogacara view posits that there are at least two types of nirvana, holding that what is called ''apratiṣṭhita-nirvana'' ("non-abiding", non-localized", "non-fixed") to be the highest nirvana, and more profound than ''pratiṣṭhita-nirvāṇa'', the ‘localized’, lesser nirvana. According to the classic Indian theory, this lesser, abiding nirvana is achieved by followers of the "inferior" vehicle (hinayana) schools which are said to only work towards their own personal liberation. From this perspective, the hinayana path only leads to one's own liberation, either as sravaka (listener, hearer, or disciple) or as pratyekabuddha (solitary realizer). (Note: The Hinayana path is sometimes equated with the modern day Theravada tradition, a classification which the Theravada-tradition rejects. Walpola Rahula: "We must not confuse Hinayana with Theravada because the terms are not synonymous. Theravada Buddhism went to Sri Lanka during the 3rd Century B.C. when there was no Mahayana at all. Hinayana sects developed in India and had an existence independent from the form of Buddhism existing in Sri Lanka. Today there is no Hinayana sect in existence anywhere in the world. Therefore, in 1950 the World Fellowship of Buddhists inaugurated in Colombo unanimously decided that the term Hinayana should be dropped when referring to Buddhism existing today in Sri Lanka, Thailand, Burma, Cambodia, Laos, etc. This is the brief history of Theravada, Mahayana and Hinayana." (Note: Walpola Rahula, Theravada - Mahayana Buddhism))

According to Robert Buswell and Donald Lopez, ''apratiṣṭhita-nirvana'' is the standard Mahāyāna view of the attainment of a Buddha, which enables them to freely return to samsara in order to help sentient beings, while still being in a kind of nirvana. The Mahāyāna path is thus said to aim at a further realization, namely an active Buddhahood that does not dwell in a static nirvana, but out of compassion (karuṇā) engages in enlightened activity to liberate beings for as long as samsara remains. (Note: From the Mahayana point of view, the nonabiding (apratiṣṭhita) nirvana is superior to the nirvana of the Lesser Vehicle: Thubten Thardo (Gareth Sparham) states: "The term "non-abiding nirvāṇa" indicates that a fully awakened buddha is utterly free from saṃsāra, yet due to compassion has not entered into a more restricted form of nirvāṇa that precludes continued activity within the world."; Erik Pema Kunsang states (based on teachings by Tulku Orgyen Rinpoche and Chokyi Nyima Rinpoche): "The lesser nirvana refers to the liberation from cyclic existence attained by a hinayana practitioner. When referring to a buddha, nirvana is the great nondwelling state of enlightenment which falls neither into the extreme of samsaric existence nor into the passive state of cessation attained by an arhant."; Thrangu Rinpoche states: "The samadhi with the union of samatha and vipasyana fully developed will free one from the bondage of samsara so one attains a state of nonabiding nirvana, which is Buddhahood.; The Padmakara Translation Group states: "It is important to realize that the term [nirvana] is understood differently by the different vehicles: the nirvana of the Basic Vehicle, the peace of cessation that an Arhat attains, is very different from a Buddha's "nondwelling" nirvana, the state of perfect enlightenment that transcends both samsara and nirvana."; Peter Harvey states: "An advanced Bodhisattva who has experienced Nirvana does not rest content with this. He turns again to samsara in the service of others, which the Mahayana-samgraha calls his 'non-abiding' (apratiṣṭhita) Nirvana, not clinging either to samsara or to Nirvana as something supposedly separate from this (Nagao, 1991)."; Rupert Gethin states: "For the Mahayana becoming a Buddha generally involves attaining what is characterized as the 'unestablished' or 'non-abiding' (apratiṣṭhita) nirvāṇa: on the one hand the knowledge of a buddha that sees emptiness, is not 'established' in saṃsāra (by seizing on birth as an individual being, for example), on the other hand the great compassion of a buddha prevents the complete turning away from saṃsāra. So ultimately he abides neither in saṃsāra nor in nirvāṇa."; Duckworth: The Lesser Vehicle does not result in the practitioner becoming a complete buddha; rather, the aim is to achieve a personal nirvana that is the total extinction of existence. The Great Vehicle, however, does result in becoming a complete buddha. A buddha remains actively engaged in enlightened activity to liberate beings for as long as samsara remains. Thus, those who accomplish the Great Vehicle do not abide in samsara due to their wisdom that sees its empty, illusory nature. Further, unlike those who attain the nirvana of the Lesser Vehicle to escape samsara, they do not abide in an isolated nirvana due to their compassion. For these reasons, in the Great Vehicle, nirvana is said to be "unlocated" or "nonabiding" (apratiṣṭhita), staying in neither samsara nor nirvana.) Apratiṣṭhita-nirvana is said to be reached when bodhisattvas eradicate both the afflictive obstructions (klesavarana) and the obstructions to omniscience (jñeyavarana), and is therefore different than the nirvana of arhats, who have eradicated only the former.

According to Alan Sponberg, apratiṣṭhita-nirvana is "a nirvana that is not permanently established in, or bound to, any one realm or sphere of activity". This is contrasted with a kind of nirvana which is "permanently established or fixed (pratiṣṭhita) in the transcendent state of nirvana-without-remainder (nirupadhisesa-nirvana)." According to Sponberg this doctrine developed among Yogacara Buddhists who rejected earlier views which were based on an individual liberation aimed at a transcendent state, separated from the mundane sphere of human existence. Mahayana Buddhists rejected this view as inconsistent with the universalist Mahayana ideal of the salvation of all beings and with the absolutist non-dual Mahayana perspective that did not see an ultimate distinction between samsara and nirvana. Sponberg also notes that the Madhyamika school also had a hand in developing this idea, due to their rejection of dualistic concepts which separated samsara and nirvana and their promotion of a form of liberation which was totally without duality.

Though the idea that Buddhas remain active in the world can be traced back to the Mahasamghika school, the term apratiṣṭhita-nirvana seems to be a Yogacara innovation. According to Gadjin Nagao, the term is likely to be an innovation of the Yogacaras, and possibly of the scholar Asanga (fl. 4th century CE). Sponberg states that this doctrine presents a "Soteriological Innovation in Yogacara Buddhism" which can be found mainly in works of the Yogacara school such as the Sandhinirmocana-sutra, the Lankavatarasutra, the Mahayanasutralamkara, and is most fully worked out in the Mahayana-samgraha of Asanga. In Chapter IX of the samgraha, Asanga presents the classic definition of apratiṣṭhita-nirvana in the context of discussing the severing of mental obstacles (avarana):

This severing is the apratiṣṭhita-nirvana of the bodhisattva. It has as its characteristic (laksana) the revolution (paravrtti) of the dual base (asraya) in which one relinquishes all defilements (klesa), but does not abandon the world of death and rebirth (samsara).

In his commentary on this passage, Asvabhava (6th century), states that the wisdom which leads to this state is termed non-discriminating cognition (nirvikalpaka-jñana) and he also notes that this state is a union of wisdom (prajña) and compassion (karuna):

The bodhisattva dwells in this revolution of the base as if in an immaterial realm (arupyadhatu). On the one hand—with respect to his own personal interests (svakartham)—he is fully endowed with superior wisdom (adhiprajña) and is thus not subject to the afflictions (klesa) while on the other hand—with respect to the interests of other beings (parartham)—he is fully endowed with great compassion (mahakaruna) and thus never ceases to dwell in the world of death and re-birth (samsara).

According to Sponberg, in Yogacara, the Buddha's special wisdom that allows participation in both nirvana and samsara, termed non-discriminating cognition (nirvikalpaka-jñana) has various aspects: a negative aspect which is free from discrimination that binds one to samsara and positive and dynamic aspects which intuitively cognize the Absolute and give a Buddha "access to the Absolute without yielding efficacy in the relative."

=== Paths to Buddhahood ===
Most sutras of the Mahāyāna tradition, states Jan Nattier, present three alternate goals of the path: Arhatship, Pratyekabuddhahood, and Buddhahood. However, according to an influential Mahāyāna text called the Lotus Sutra, while the lesser attainment of individual nirvana is taught as a skillful means by the Buddha in order to help beings of lesser capacities; ultimately, the highest and only goal is the attainment of Buddhahood. The Lotus sutra further states that, although these three paths are seemingly taught by Buddhas as separate vehicles (yana), they are really all just skillful ways (upaya) of teaching a single path (ekayana), which is the bodhisattva path to full Buddhahood. Thus, these three separate goals are not really different at all, the 'lesser' paths are actually just clever teaching devices used by Buddhas to get people to practice, eventually though, they will be led to the one and only path of Mahāyāna and full Buddhahood.

The Mahāyāna commentary the Abhisamayalamkara presents the path of the bodhisattva as a progressive formula of Five Paths (pañcamārga). A practitioner on the Five Paths advances through a progression of ten stages, referred to as the bodhisattva bhūmis (grounds or levels).

=== Omniscience ===
The end stage practice of the Mahāyāna removes the imprints of delusions, the obstructions to omniscience (sarvākārajñatā), which prevent simultaneous and direct knowledge of all phenomena. Only Buddhas have overcome these obstructions and, therefore, only Buddhas have omniscience knowledge, which refers to the power of a being in some way to have "simultaneous knowledge of all things whatsoever". From the Mahāyāna point of view, an arhat who has achieved the nirvana of the Lesser Vehicle will still have certain subtle obscurations that prevent the arhat from realizing complete omniscience. When these final obscurations are removed, the practitioner will attain apratiṣṭhita-nirvana and achieve full omniscience. (Note: Translator Jeffrey Hopkins provides the following analogy:"If you put garlic in a vessel, it deposits some of its odor in the vessel itself; Thus when you seek to clean the vessel, it is necessary to first remove the garlic. Similarly, a consciousness conceiving inherent existence, like garlic, deposits predispositions in the mind that produce the appearance of inherent existence; Thus, there is no way to cleanse the mind of those predispositions, which are like the flavor of garlic left in the vessel of the mind, until one removes all consciousnesses conceiving of inherent existence from the mind. First, the garlic must be removed; then, its odor can be removed. For this reason, according to the Consequence School, until one has utterly removed all the afflictive obstructions, one cannot begin to remove the obstructions to omniscience. Since this is the case, a practitioner cannot begin overcoming the obstructions to omniscience on any of the seven first bodhisattva grounds, which are called "impure" because one still has afflictive obstructions to be abandoned. Rather, one begins abandoning the obstructions to omniscience on the eighth bodhisattva ground, and continues to do so on the ninth and tenth, these three being called the 'three pure grounds" because the afflictive obstructions have been abandoned.")

=== Buddhahood's bodies ===
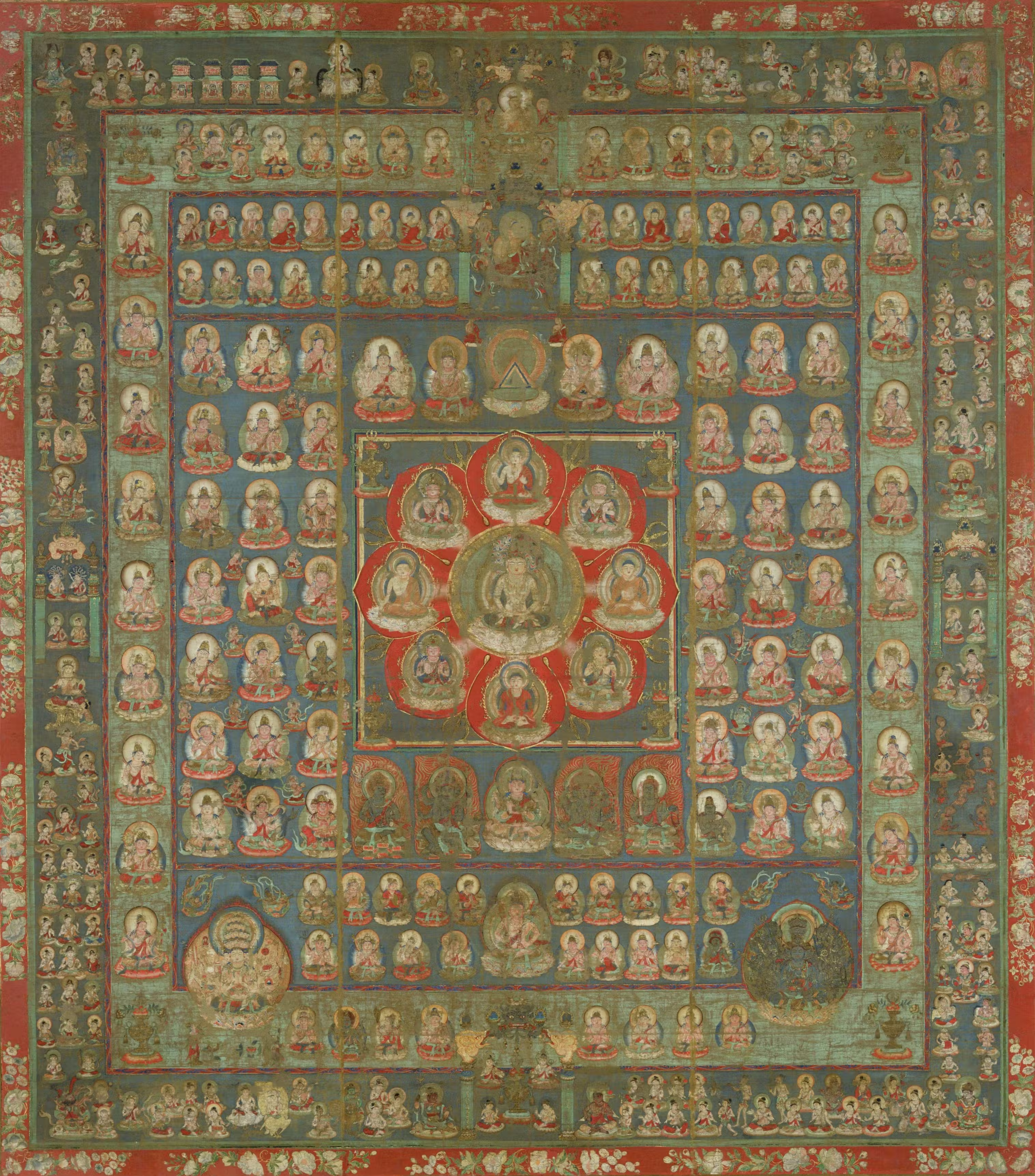
The Garbhadhatu mandala of the Mahavairocana Tantra representing multiple manifestations of the Dharmakaya, the Buddha Vairocana.

Some Mahāyāna traditions see the Buddha in docetic terms, viewing his visible manifestations as projections from its nirvanic state. According to Etienne Lamotte, Buddhas are always and at all times in nirvana, and their corporeal displays of themselves and their Buddhic careers are ultimately illusory. Lamotte writes of the Buddhas:

They are born, reach enlightenment, set turning the Wheel of Dharma, and enter nirvana. However, all this is only illusion: the appearance of a Buddha is the absence of arising, duration and destruction; their nirvana is the fact that they are always and at all times in nirvana.'

This doctrine, developed among the Mahāsaṃghikas, where the historical person, Gautama Buddha, was one of these transformation bodies (Skt. nirmāṇakāya), while the essential Buddha is equated with the transcendental Buddha called dharmakāya. In Mahāyāna, this eventually developed into the doctrine of the "Three Bodies" of the Buddha (Trikaya). This doctrine is interpreted in different ways by the different Mahāyāna traditions. According to Reginald Ray, it is "the body of reality itself, without specific, delimited form, wherein the Buddha is identified with the spiritually charged nature of everything that is."

=== Buddha-nature ===
An alternative idea of Mahāyāna nirvana is found in the Tathāgatagarbha sūtras. The title itself means a garbha (womb, matrix, seed) containing Tathagata (Buddha). These Sutras suggest, states Paul Williams, that 'all sentient beings contain a Tathagata' as their 'essence, core or essential inner nature'. The tathāgatagarbha doctrine (also called buddhadhatu, buddha-nature), at its earliest probably appeared about the later part of the 3rd century CE, and is verifiable in Chinese translations of 1st millennium CE. Most scholars consider the tathāgatagarbha doctrine of an 'essential nature' in every living being is equivalent to 'Self', (Note: Wayman and Wayman have disagreed with this view, and they state that the Tathagatagarbha is neither self nor sentient being, nor soul, nor personality.) and it contradicts the "no self" (or no soul, no atman, anatta) doctrines in a vast majority of Buddhist texts, leading scholars to posit that the Tathagatagarbha Sutras were written to promote Buddhism to non-Buddhists. The Mahāyāna tradition thus often discusses nirvana with its concept of the tathāgatagarbha, the innate presence of Buddhahood. According to Alex Wayman, Buddha nature has its roots in the idea of an innately pure luminous mind (prabhasvara citta,) "which is only adventitiously covered over by defilements (agantukaklesa)" lead to the development of the concept of Buddha-nature, the idea that Buddha-hood is already innate, but not recognised.

The tathāgatagarbha has numerous interpretations in the various schools of Mahāyāna and Vajrayana Buddhism. Indian Madhyamaka philosophers generally interpreted the theory as a description of emptiness and as a non implicative negation (a negation which leaves nothing un-negated). According to Karl Brunnhölzl, early Indian Yogacaras like Asanga and Vasubandhu referred to the term as "nothing but suchness in the sense of twofold identitylessness". However some later Yogacarins like Ratnakarasanti considered it "equivalent to naturally luminous mind, nondual self-awareness."

The debate as to whether tathāgatagarbha was just a way to refer to emptiness or whether it referred to some kind of mind or consciousness also resumed in Chinese Buddhism, with some Chinese Yogacarins, like Fazang and Ratnamati supporting the idea that it was an eternal non-dual mind, while Chinese Madhyamikas like Jizang rejecting this view and seeing tathāgatagarbha as emptiness and "the middle way."

In some Tantric Buddhist texts such as the Samputa Tantra, nirvana is described as purified, non-dualistic 'superior mind'.

In Tibetan Buddhist philosophy, the debate continues to this day. There are those like the Gelug school, who argue that tathāgatagarbha is just emptiness (described either as dharmadhatu, the nature of phenomena, or a nonimplicative negation). Then there are those who see it as the non-dual union of the mind's unconditioned emptiness and conditioned lucidity (the view of Gorampa of the Sakya school). Others such as the Jonang school and some Kagyu figures, see tathāgatagarbha as a kind of Absolute which "is empty of adventitious defilements which are intrinsically other than it, but is not empty of its own inherent existence".

=== Mahāparinirvāṇa Sūtra ===
According to some scholars, the language used in the tathāgatagarbha genre of sutras can be seen as an attempt to state orthodox Buddhist teachings of dependent origination using positive language. Kosho Yamamoto translates the explanation of nirvana in the Mahāyāna Mahāparinirvāṇa Sūtra (c. 100-220 CE) as follows:

"O good man! We speak of "Nirvana". But this is not "Great" "Nirvana". Why is it "Nirvana", but not "Great Nirvana"? This is so when one cuts away defilement without seeing the Buddha-Nature. That is why we say Nirvana, but not Great Nirvana. When one does not see the Buddha-Nature, what there is is the non-Eternal and the non-Self. All that there is is but Bliss and Purity. Because of this, we cannot have Mahaparinirvana, although defilement has been done away with. When one sees well the Buddha-Nature and cuts away defilement, we then have Mahaparinirvana. Seeing the Buddha-Nature, we have the Eternal, Bliss, the Self, and the Pure. Because of this, we can have Mahaparinirvana, as we cut away defilement."

"O good man! "Nir" means "not"; "va" means "to extinguish". Nirvana means "non- extinction". Also, "va" means "to cover". Nirvana also means "not covered". "Not covered" is Nirvana. "Va" means "to go and come". "Not to go and come" is Nirvana. "Va" means "to take". "Not to take" is Nirvana." "Va" means "not fixed". When there is no unfixedness, there is Nirvana. "Va" means "new and old". What is not new and old is Nirvana.
"O good man! The disciples of Uluka [i.e. the founder of the Vaishesika school of philosophy] and Kapila [founder of the Samkhya school of philosophy] say: "Va means characterisitic". "Characteristiclessness" is Nirvana."
"O good man! Va means "is". What is not "is" is Nirvana. Va means harmony. What has nothing to be harmonised is Nirvana. Va means suffering. What has no suffering is Nirvana.
"O good man! What has cut away defilement is no Nirvana. What calls forth no defilement is Nirvana. O good man! The All-Buddha-Tathagata calls forth no defilement. This is Nirvana.

— Mahayana Mahaparinirvana Sutra, Chapter 31, Translated by Kōshō Yamamoto (Note: The names of the founders of Hindu philosophy, along with Rishaba of Jainism, as well as Shiva and Vishnu, are found in the Chinese versions of the Mahaparinirvana Sutra.)

In the Mahāparinirvāṇa Sūtra, the Buddha speak of four attributes which make up nirvana. Writing on this Mahayana understanding of nirvana, William Edward Soothill and Lewis Hodous state:

'The Nirvana Sutra claims for nirvana the ancient ideas of permanence, bliss, personality, purity in the transcendental realm. Mahayana declares that Hinayana, by denying personality in the transcendental realm, denies the existence of the Buddha. In Mahayana, final nirvana is both mundane and transcendental, and is also used as a term for the Absolute.

== See also ==
- Ataraxia
- Bodhi
- Enlightenment (religious)
- Moksha
- Nibbāna: The Mind Stilled
- Nirvana
- Parinirvana
- Pure Land
- Satori
- Śūnyatā

== Notes ==
Further notes on "different paths"

== Quotes ==
Further notes on quotes

== Sources ==
=== Printed sources ===
- Ajahn Sucitto (2010), Turning the Wheel of Truth: Commentary on the Buddha's First Teaching, Shambhala
- Akizuki, Ryōmin (1990), New Mahāyāna: Buddhism for a Post-modern World, Jain Publishing Company
- Anam Thubten (2009), No Self No Problem (Kindle ed.), Snow Lion
- Bareau, Andre (1955). "Chapitre I 'Les Mahasanghika'". Les sectes bouddhiques du Petit Vehicule. Ecole Fransaise d'Extreme-Orient.
- Baroni, Helen Josephine (2002), The Illustrated Encyclopedia of Zen Buddhism, The Rosen Publishing Group
- Bhikkhu Bodhi, (translator) (2000), The Connected Discourses of the Buddha: A New Translation of the Samyutta Nikaya, Boston: Wisdom Publications, ISBN 0-86171-331-1
- Bhikkhu Bodhi (2005), In the Buddha's words An Anthology of Discourses from the Pali Canon, Wisdom Publications
- Bhikkhu Bodhi (2007), Nibbana (PDF), Hong Kong Insight Meditation Society
- Bhikkhu Bodhi (2011), The Noble Eightfold Path: Way to the End of Suffering (Kindle ed.), Independent Publishers Group
- Bhikkhu Bodhi (2012), A Comprehensive Manual of Abhidhamma: The Abhidhammattha Sangaha (Kindle ed.), Independent Publishers Group
- Brahmāli, Bhikkhu (2009). "What the Nikāyas Say and Do not Say about Nibbāna". Buddhist Studies Review. 26 (1): 33–66. doi:10.1558/bsrv.v26i1.33.
- Bronkhorst, Johannes (1993), The Two Traditions of Meditation In Ancient India, Motilal Banarsidass
- Brunnhölzl, Karl (2014), When the Clouds Part, The 'Uttaratantra' and Its Meditative Tradition as a Bridge between Sutra and Tantra, Boston & London: Snow Lion
- Buddhaghosa (1999), Visuddhimagga: The Path of Purification, translated by Ñāṇamoli Bhikkhu, Buddhist Publication Society, ISBN 1-928706-01-0
- Buswell, Robert E. (2004), Encyclopedia of Buddhism, MacMillan, ISBN 978-0028657202
- Buswell, Robert E. Jr.; Lopez, Donald S. Jr. (2013), The Princeton Dictionary of Buddhism, Princeton University, ISBN 978-1-4008-4805-8
- Clarke, Peter (2004), Encyclopedia of New Religious Movements, Routledge
- Choong, Mun-Keat (1999), The Notion of Emptiness in Early Buddhism, Motilal Banarsidass Publishers
- Collins, Steven (1990). Selfless Persons: Imagery and Thought in Theravada Buddhism. Cambridge University Press. ISBN 978-0-521-39726-1.
- Collins, Steven (1998). Nirvana and Other Buddhist Felicities. Cambridge University Press. ISBN 978-0-521-57054-1.
- Collins, Steven (2010), Nirvana: Concept, Imagery, Narrative, Cambridge University Press, ISBN 978-0-521-88198-2
- Conze, Edward (1967), Thirty years of Buddhis Studies. Selected essays by Edward Conze (PDF), Bruno Cassirer, archived from the original (PDF) on 2023-05-19
- Cousins, L.S. (1998), "Nirvana", in Craig, Edward (ed.), Routledge Encyclopedia of Philosophy. Volume 7: Nihilism to Quantum Mechanics, Taylor & Francis
- Dutt, Nalinaksha. Buddhist Sects in India.
- Duiker, William J.; Spielvogel, Jackson J. (2008). World History: To 1800. Wadsworth. ISBN 9780495050537.
- Duckworth, Douglas (2011), Jamgon Mipam: His Life and Teachings (Kindle ed.), Shambhala
- Dudjom Rinpoche (2011), A Torch Lighting the Way to Freedom: Complete Instructions on the Preliminary Practices, Translated by the Padmakara Translation Group (Kindle ed.), Shambhala
- Duiker, William J.; Spielvogel, Jackson J. (2008). World History: To 1800. Wadsworth. ISBN 9780495050537.
- Dundas, Paul (2002). The Jains. London: Routledge. ISBN 978-0415266062.
- Fischer-Schreiber, Ingrid; Ehrhard, Franz-Karl; Diener, Michael S. (2008), Lexicon Boeddhisme. Wijsbegeerte, religie, psychologie, mystiek, cultuur en literatuur, Asoka
- Gethin, Rupert (1998), Foundations of Buddhism, Oxford University Press
- Goldstein, Joseph (2011), One Dharma: The Emerging Western Buddhism (Kindle ed.), HarperCollins
- Goleman, Daniel (2008), Destructive Emotions: A Scientific Dialogue with the Dalai Lama (Kindle ed.), Bantam
- Gombrich, Richard F. (1992), "Dating the Buddha: a red herring revealed", in Bechert, Heinz (ed.), Die Datierung des historischen Buddha [The Dating of the Historical Buddha], Symposien zur Buddhismusforschung (in German), vol. IV, Gottingen: Vandenhoeck and Ruprecht, pp. 237–259
- Gombrich, Richard F. (1996), Theravada Buddhism. A Social History from Ancient Benares to Modern Colombo, London and New York: Routledge
- Gombrich, Richard F. (2006), How Buddhism Began. The conditioned genesis of the early teachings. Second edition, Routledge
- Gombrich, Richard (2009), What The Buddha Thought, Equinox
- Gregory, Peter N. (1991), "Sudden Enlightenment Followed by Gradual Cultivation: Tsung-mi's Analysis of Mind", in Peter N. Gregory (ed.), Sudden and Gradual. Approaches to Enlightenment in Chinese Thought, Delhi: Motilal Banarsidass Publishers
- Hamilton, Sue (2000). Early Buddhism: A New Approach: The I of the Beholder. Routledge. ISBN 978-0-7007-1280-9.
- Hamilton-Blyth, Sue (2013). Early Buddhism: A New Approach: The I of the Beholder. Routledge. ISBN 978-1-136-84293-1.
- Harvey, Peter (1989), "Consciousness Mysticism in the Discourses of the Buddha", in Werner, Karel (ed.), The Yogi and the Mystic, Curzon Press
- Harvey, Peter (1990), Introduction to Buddhism, Cambridge University Press
- Harvey, Peter (1995a), An introduction to Buddhism. Teachings, history and practices, Cambridge University Press
- Harvey, Peter (1995b), The Selfless Mind: Personality, Consciousness and Nirvāṇa in Early Buddhism, Routledge, ISBN 0-7007-0338-1
- Harvey, Peter (2012). An Introduction to Buddhism: Teachings, History and Practices. Cambridge University Press. ISBN 978-0-521-85942-4.
- Hindson, Ed (2008). The Popular Encyclopedia of Apologetics. Harvest House Publishers. ISBN 9780736936354.
- Hwang, Soonil (2006), Metaphor and Literalism in Buddhism: The Doctrinal History of Nirvana, Routledge
- Jayatilleke, K.N., The message of the Buddha, The Free Press
- Kalupahana, David J., Causality: The Central Philosophy of Buddhism
- Keown, Damien (2000), Buddhism: A Very Short Introduction (Kindle ed.), Oxford University Press
- Keown, Damien (2004). A Dictionary of Buddhism. Oxford University Press. ISBN 978-0-19-157917-2.
- Khunu Rinpoche (2012), Vast as the Heavens, Deep as the Sea: Verses in Praise of Bodhicitta, Translated by Thubten Thardo (Gareth Sparham) (Kindle ed.), Wisdom
- Kornberg Greenberg, Yudit (2008), Encyclopedia of Love in World Religions, Volume 2, ABC-CLIO
- Lama Surya Das (1997), Awakening the Buddha Within (Kindle ed.), Broadway Books
- Lindtner, Christian (1997), "The Problem of Precanonical Buddhism", Buddhist Studies Review, 14 (2): 109–139, doi:10.1558/bsrv.v14i2.14851, S2CID 247883744
- Lindtner, Christian (1999), "From Brahmanism to Buddhism", Asian Philosophy, 9 (1): 5–37, doi:10.1080/09552369908575487
- Lopez, Donald S. (2001), The Story of Buddhism, HarperCollins
- Mackenzie, Rory (2007), New Buddhist Movements in Thailand: Towards an Understanding of Wat Phra Dhammakaya and Santi Asoke (PDF), Routledge, ISBN 978-1-134-13262-1, archived from the original (PDF) on March 16, 2015
- Maha Boowa (2005). Arahattamagga, Arahattaphala: the Path to Arahantship – A Compilation of Venerable Acariya Maha Boowa's Dhamma Talks about His Path of Practice (PDF). Translated by Bhikkhu Silaratano. Thailand: Silpa Siam Packaging & Printing Co. ISBN 974-93100-1-2. Archived from the original (PDF) on 2009-03-27.
- Mahāsi Sayādaw. Bhikkhu Pesala (ed.). On the Nature of Nibbāna. Translated by U Htin Fatt. Rangoon: Buddha Sāsanānuggaha Organisation Mahāsi Translation Committee.
- Moffitt, Philip (2008), Dancing with Life: Buddhist Insights for Finding Meaning and Joy in the Face of Suffering (Kindle ed.), Rodale
- Ñāṇamoli Bhikkhu (1999), Introduction, Visuddhimagga: The Path of Purification, by Buddhaghosa, translated by Ñāṇamoli Bhikkhu, Buddhist Publication Society, ISBN 1-928706-01-0
- Pabongka Rinpoche (2006), Liberation in the Palm of Your Hand: A Concise Discourse on the Path to Enlightenment (Kindle ed.), Wisdom
- Pasanno & Amaro (2009). The Island: An Anthology of the Buddha's Teachings on Nibbāna. Abhayagiri Monastic Foundation. Archived from the original on 2010-05-23 – via abhayagiri.org.
- Pruthi, R.K. (2004). Sikhism And Indian Civilization. Discovery Publishing House. ISBN 9788171418794.
- Rahula, Walpola (2007), What the Buddha Taught (Kindle ed.), Grove Press
- Rahula, Walpola, What the Buddha Taught (Revised ed.)
- Ray, Reginald (1999), Buddhist Saints in India: A Study in Buddhist Values and Orientations, Oxford University Press
- Reat, N. Ross (1998), The Salistamba Sutra, Motilal Banarsidass
- Ringu Tulku (2005), Daring Steps Toward Fearlessness: The Three Vehicles of Tibetan Buddhism, Snow Lion
- Sharf, Robert H. (1995), "Buddhist Modernism and the Rhetoric of Meditative Experience" (PDF), NUMEN, 42 (3): 228–283, doi:10.1163/1568527952598549, hdl:2027.42/43810, archived from the original (PDF) on 2019-04-12
- Sharf, Robert H. (2000), "The Rhetoric of Experience and the Study of Religion." (PDF), Journal of Consciousness Studies, 7 (11–12): 267–87, archived from the original (PDF) on 2013-05-13
- Smith, Huston; Novak, Philip (2009), Buddhism: A Concise Introduction (Kindle ed.), HarperOne
- Snelling, John (1987), The Buddhist handbook. A Complete Guide to Buddhist Teaching and Practice, London: Century Paperbacks
- Swanson, Paul L. (1997), "Zen is not Buddhism, Recent Japanese Critiques of Buddha-Nature", Numen, 40 (2), Brill Academic: 115–149, doi:10.1163/156852793X00112
- Thích Thiện Châu (1984), The Literature of the Personalists
- Thich Nhat Hanh (1991), Old Path White Clouds, Parallax Press
- Thich Nhat Hanh (1999), The Heart of the Buddha's Teaching, Three River Press
- Thrangu Rinpoche (1993), The Practice of Tranquillity & Insight: A Guide to Tibetan Buddhist Mediation, Snow Lion
- Trainor, Kevin (2004). Buddhism: The Illustrated Guide. Oxford University Press. ISBN 9780195173987.
- Traleg Kyabgon (2001), The Essence of Buddhism, Shambhala
- Tsele Natsok Rangdrol (1987), The Mirror of Mindfulness, translated by Erik Pema Kunsang, Rangjung Yeshe
- Vetter, Tilmann (1988), The Ideas and Meditative Practices of Early Buddhism, Brill Academic, ISBN 90-04-08959-4
- Walshe, Maurice (1995), The Long Discourses of the Buddha. A Translation of the Digha Nikaya, Wisdom Publications
- Wayman, Alex and Hideko (1990), The Lion's roar of Queen Srimala, Delhi: Motilal Banarsidass Publishers
- Williams, Paul (1994), Mahayana Buddhism. The Doctrinal Foundations, Routledge
- Williams, Paul (2002), Buddhist Thought (Kindle ed.), Taylor & Francis
- Williams, Paul (2008), Mahayana Buddhism: The Doctrinal Foundations (PDF) (2nd ed.), Routledge, ISBN 978-1-134-25056-1, archived from the original (PDF) on 2017-03-29 Via Google Books.
- Wynne, Alexander (2007), The Origin of Buddhist Meditation, Routledge
- Yamamoto Kosho (1975), Mahayanism: A Critical Exposition of the Mahāyāna Mahāparinirvāna Sutra, Ube City: Karinbunko
