= Fahai (Tang dynasty) =

Chinese Buddhist monk during the Tang dynasty

- Chinese: 法海
Transcriptions
Standard Mandarin
- Hanyu Pinyin: Fǎ Hǎi
- Wade–Giles: Fa^{3} Hai^{3}
Yue: Cantonese
- Yale Romanization: Faat Hói
- Jyutping: Faat^{3} Hoi^{2}

Fahai was a monk who lived in Tang dynasty, and was identified as a compiler of Chan/Zen Buddhism according to the Dunhuang edition of the Platform Sutra. Fahai, whose secular name was Pei Wende (裴文德), courtesy name Wende, also known as Pei Toutuo, was a native of Pei Village, Jiyuan County, Tang Dynasty. He was the son of the famous prime minister Pei Xiu (裴休). He was given the Dharma name "Fahai" because he became a monk in place of the prince. Fahai was a disciple of the Sixth Patriarch of Chan/Zen Buddhism, Hui-neng. According to Records of the Transmission of the Lamp, Fahai was a native of Qujiang in Shao Prefecture (modern Shaoguan, Guangdong).

He was the "founding patriarch Pei" (開山裴祖) of Jinshan Temple (金山寺), a famous temple in Jiangnan, and a highly accomplished Zen monk in the Tang Dynasty. As a patriarch of Chan/Zen Buddhism, Fahai was one of the editors of the Platform Sutra. Fahai contributed to the translation of the sutra and left editing notes in his version of the translation and warned about haphazard transmission. A famous dialogue between Fahai and the sixth patriarch Hui-Neng was recorded in the Platform Sutra:

"The mind has always been the buddha, before I understood I deceived myself, knowing now how mediation and wisdom work, I cultivate both and transcend all things."
