= Platform Sutra =

Popular Sutra in Mahāyāna Buddhism

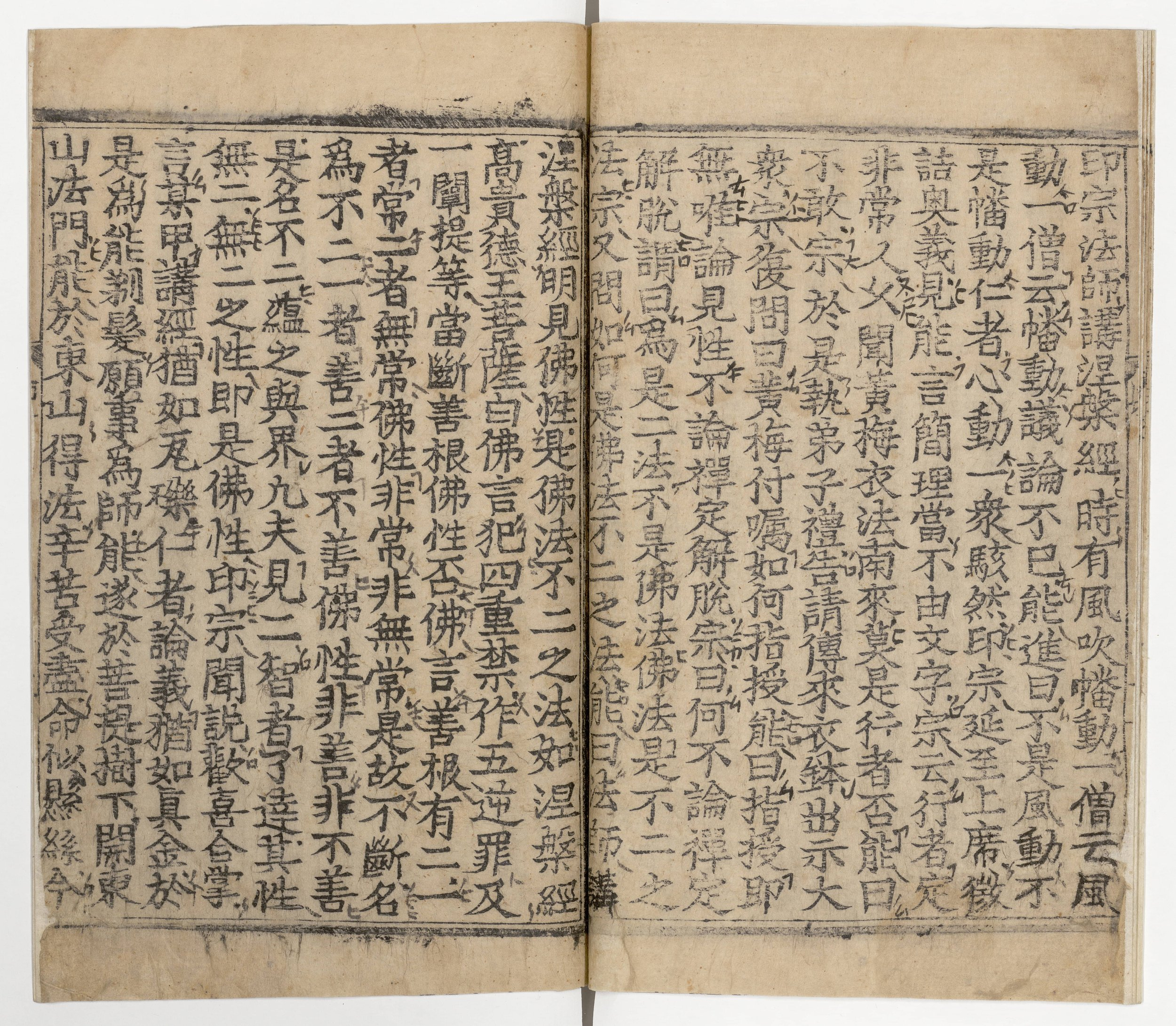
Double page from the Korean woodblock print of "The Sixth Patriarch's Dharma Jewel Platform Sutra", Goryeo, c. 1310. Bibliothèque Nationale de France.

The Platform Sutra of the Sixth Patriarch (Chinese: 六祖壇經; pinyin: Liùzǔ Tánjīng or simply 壇經; Tánjīng) is a Chan Buddhist scripture that was composed in China during the 8th to 13th century. The "platform" (施法壇) refers to the podium on which a Buddhist teacher speaks. It is a repository of early Chan teachings, centering on the notion of the Buddha-nature, which is "only made invisible to ordinary humans by their illusions." Notably, in Chan Buddhism it is the only Chinese Buddhist text that is explicitly referred to as a "Sutra," emphasizing its central importance in the canon.

The text centers on the teachings and stories ascribed to the sixth Chan patriarch Huineng. It contains the well-known story of the contest for the succession of Hongren (enlightenment by the non-abiding), and discourses and dialogues attributed to Huineng.

The text attributes its recollection to Fa-hai, but was probably written, or redacted, within the so-called Oxhead school, which existed along with the East Mountain School and Shenhui's Southern School. The text attempts to reconcile the so-called Northern School with its alleged gradual enlightenment teachings, and the so-called Southern School with its alleged sudden enlightenment teachings. In effect, the text incorporates the "rhetorical purity" which originated with Shenhui's attack on Shenxiu, while effectively "writing him out of the story".

== History of the text ==
The Platform Sutra underwent various redactions. Though its recollection has been attributed to Fa-hai, a student of Huineng, its origins are not clear:

The early development of the Platform Sutra is shrouded in the mists of time, and we will probably never know much for certain about it. The Dunhuang Manuscripts version of the text, the earliest complete edition we have, is almost certainly a product of a long evolution with elements coming together from several different Chan groups with different agendas, as the uneven character of the text and its internal inconsistencies attest.

The Dunhuang versions are the oldest texts available, with the full title Southern School's Sudden Doctrine, Supreme Mahayana Great Perfection of Wisdom: The Platform Sutra as Delivered by the Sixth Patriarch Huineng at the Dafan Temple in Shao Prefecture 南宗頓教最上大乘摩訶般若波羅蜜經：六祖惠能大師於韶州大梵寺施法壇經, subtitled, “one roll, recorded by the spreader of the Dharma, the disciple Fahai, who at the same time received the Precepts of Formlessness” (一卷，兼受無相戒弘法弟子法海集記).

Two copies dated to between 830 and 860 have been found in the Mogao Caves in Dunhuang. Both are thought to be based on an edition from about 780. The finds at Dunhuang have been very important for the historical understanding of Zen:

Scholarship on early Chan was transformed after the discovery in the beginning of the twentieth century of a number of texts relating to the early Chan movement in the cave library at Dunhuang, which also contained an early version of the Platform Sutra.

In 1056, the Chinese scholar-monk Qisong (Chinese: 契嵩; Wade–Giles: Ch'i-sung) produced a larger edition, entitled Liuzu fabao ji (法寶記; "Precious Record of the Dharma").

In 1291 (during the Yuan dynasty), Zongbao (宗寶; Tsung-pao) produced the edition that became part of the Ming Dynasty (1368-1644) Chinese Buddhist canon. This canonical version, apparently based on the Qisong edition, is about a third longer than the Mogao Caves version, and structured differently.

Much of the content of chapters seven, eight, and nine of the longer Platform Sutra was imported into the text from the Jingde Chuandeng lu.

== Contents ==
The Platform Sutra is:

...a wonderful melange of early Chan teachings, a virtual repository of the entire tradition up to the second half of the eighth century. At the heart of the sermon is the same understanding of the Buddha-nature that we have seen in texts attributed to Bodhidharma and Hongren, including the idea that the fundamental Buddha-nature is only made invisible to ordinary humans by their illusions".

=== Chapter One - Personal History ===
Chapter One contains the well-known story of the contest for the succession of Hongren. It is an essential part of the Traditional Zen Narrative. The Fifth Patriarch summoned all his followers and proposed a poem contest for his followers to demonstrate the stage of their understanding of the essence of mind. He decided to pass down his robe and teachings to the winner of the contest, who would become the Sixth Patriarch. Shenxiu, the leading disciple of the Fifth Patriarch, composed a stanza, but did not have the courage to present it to the master. Instead, he wrote his stanza on the south corridor wall to remain anonymous one day at midnight about one o'clock in the morning. The other monks saw the stanza and commended it. Shenxiu's stanza is as follows:

The body is the bodhi tree.
The mind is like a bright mirror's stand.
At all times we must strive to polish it
and must not let dust collect. (Note: Addiss, Lombardo, and Roitman give a different translation: The body is the tree of enlightenment, The mind is like a bright mirror’s stand; Time after time polish it diligently, So that no dust can collect.)

The Patriarch was not satisfied with Shenxiu's stanza, and pointed out that the poem did not show understanding of "[his] own fundamental nature and essence of mind." He gave Shenxiu a chance to submit another poem to demonstrate that he had entered the "gate of enlightenment," so that he could transmit his robe and the Dharma to Shenxiu, but the student's mind was agitated and could not write one more stanza.

Two days later, the illiterate Huineng heard Shenxiu's stanza being chanted by a young attendant at the monastery and inquired about the context of the poem. The attendant explained to him the poem contest and the transmission of the robe and Dharma. Huineng asked to be led to the corridor, where he could also pay homage to the stanza. He asked a low-ranking official named Zhang Riyong from Jiangzhou to read the verse to him, and then immediately asked him to write down a stanza that he composed.

According to McRae, "the earliest version of the Platform Sutra contains two versions of Huineng's verse. A later version of Huineng's stanza is different from the two older ones:

Bodhi originally has no tree.
The mirror has no stand.
The Buddha-nature is
always clear and pure.
Where is there room for dust?

The mind is the bodhi tree.
The body is the bright mirror's stand.
The bright mirror is
originally clear and pure.
Where could there be any dust?

Bodhi originally has no tree.
The bright mirror also has no stand.
Fundamentally there is not a single thing.
Where could dust arise? (Note: Addiss, Lombardo, and Roitman give the following translation: Enlightenment is not a tree, The bright mirror has no stand; Originally there is not one thing- What place could there be for dust?)

The followers who were present were astonished by the work of a southern barbarian. Being cautious of Huineng's status, the Patriarch wiped away the stanza and claimed that the author of the stanza had not reached enlightenment.

According to the traditional interpretation, which is based on Guifeng Zongmi, the fifth-generation successor of Shenhui, the two verses represent respectively the gradual and the sudden approach. According to McRae, this is an incorrect understanding:

[T]he verse attributed to Shenxiu does not in fact refer to gradual or progressive endeavor, but to a constant practice of cleaning the mirror [...] [H]is basic message was that of the constant and perfect teaching, the endless personal manifestation of the bodhisattva ideal.

Huineng's verse does not stand alone, but forms a pair with Shenxiu's verse:

Huineng's verse(s) apply the rhetoric of emptiness to undercut the substantiality of the terms of that formulation. However, the basic meaning of the first proposition still remains".

McRae notes a similarity in reasoning with the Oxhead School, which used a threefold structure of "absolute, relative and middle", or "thesis-antithesis-synthesis". According to McRae, the Platform Sutra itself is the synthesis in this threefold structure, giving a balance between the need of constant practice and the insight into the absolute.

=== Chapter Two - Prajñā (Lecture) ===
Chapter Two contains a lecture on prajñā, given after a recitation of the Mahāprajñāpāramitā Sūtra. From this chapter:

When our mind works freely without any hindrance, and is at liberty to "come" or to "go", we attain Samadhi of Prajna, or liberation. Such a state is called the function of "thoughtlessness." But to refrain from thinking of anything, so that all thoughts are suppressed, is to be Dharma-ridden, and this is an erroneous view.

=== Chapter Three - Questions ===
In Chapter Three Huineng answers questions from a lay audience. Huineng discusses the famous story of Bodhidharma telling Emperor Wu of Liang that his good deeds would bring him no merit. Next, he discusses the Pure Land of the West, asserting the greater importance of one's inner state compared to one's physical location. This leads to a conclusion in which Huineng asserts that lay practice outside of a monastery is preferable to following the forms of monastic renunciation without inner practice.

=== Chapter Four - Meditation and Wisdom (Lecture) ===
In Chapter Four, meditation and wisdom are said to be of the same essence:

Meditation and wisdom are of one essence, not different. Meditation is the essence of wisdom, and wisdom is the function of meditation. At times of wisdom, meditation exists in that wisdom; at times of meditation, wisdom exists in that meditation.

=== Chapter Five - Seated Meditation (Lecture) ===
Chapter Five details the "pureness of our fundamental nature":

In this teaching of seated meditation, one fundamentally does not concentrate on mind, nor does one concentrate on purity, nor is it motionlessness. If one is to concentrate on the mind, then the mind [involved] is fundamentally false. You should understand that the mind is like a phantasm, so nothing can concentrate on it. If one is to concentrate on purity, then [realize that because] our natures are fundamentally pure, it is through false thoughts that suchness is covered up. Just be without false thoughts and the nature is pure of itself. If you activate your mind to become attached to purity, you will only generate the falseness of purity. The false is without location; it is the concentration that is false. Purity is without shape and characteristics; you only create the characteristics of purity and say this is ‘effort’ [in meditation]. To have such a view is to obscure one’s own fundamental nature, and only to be fettered by purity.

=== Chapter Six - Ceremony of Repentance ===
Chapter Six describes a repentance-ritual.

=== Chapter Seven - Key Events (Encounter stories and dialogues) ===
Chapter Seven gives various stories of encounters and dialogues.

=== Chapter Eight - Immediate and Gradual (Encounter stories and dialogues) ===
Chapter Eight also gives various stories of encounters and dialogues.

=== Chapter Nine - The Imperial Summons ===
Chapter Nine describes the request of the Imperial Court for Huineng to visit the Emperor, and Huineng's decline of this command.

=== Chapter Ten - Transmission ===
In the chapter on his final instructions, Huineng instructs his accomplished disciples, giving specific instructions how to "preach the Dharma", which show the influence of the Buddhist teachings on the five skandhas, the concept of Namarupa, and the Yogacara-teachings:

One day, the master summoned his disciples Fahai, Zhicheng, Fada, Shenhui, Zhichang, Zhitong, Zhiche, Zhidao, Fazhen, and Faru, and said, “You are different from other people. After my extinction you should each become a master in a different region. I will now teach you how to preach the Dharma without losing the fundamental doctrine.

“First you should discuss the three categories of the teaching and the thirty-six responses of active functioning. Coming out and going in transcend the two extremes. In preaching all the Dharmas, do not depart from the self-nature.

“The three categories of the teaching are the skandhas, realms, and entrances. ‘Skandhas’ refers to the five skandhas of form, feelings, thoughts, impulses, and consciousness. ‘Entrances’ refers to the twelve entrances (āyatanas): the six types of external sense data of forms, sounds, smells, tastes, tangibles, and dharmas; and the six internal sense organs of eyes, ears, nose, tongue, body, and mind. ‘Realms’ refers to the eighteen realms: the six types of sensory data, the six senses, and the six consciousnesses. The self-nature is able to incorporate the myriad dharmas and is named the ‘storehouse consciousness.’ If one activates thinking, it is the ‘transformation consciousnesses,’ the generation of the six consciousnesses to exit the six senses and see the six types of sensory data.

== Scholarship and translations ==
=== Japanese scholarship ===
In the 1920s, Japanese scholar Yabuki Keiki (矢吹慶輝 1879-1939) produced an edition based on one of the Mogao Caves texts (the only one known at the time), dividing the text into fifty-seven sections.

In 1934, D. T. Suzuki published an edition based on the Mogao Cave text, but incorporating corrections from the Tsungpao (Zongbao) edition.

In 1993, the Buddhist scholar Yang Zengwen (楊曾文, b. 1939, Shandong) published an annotated edition of the second Mogao Caves text (which has fewer errors than the first Mogao Caves text). (Pine, 2006, Introduction)

=== Translations into English ===
The first published translation into English was completed in 1930 by Wong Mou-lam (黃茂林 c. 1886-1934) from Guangdong. It was based on the canonical Tsungpao edition, and published by the Yu Ching Press of Shanghai.

The Suzuki edition was translated into English by Wing-tsit Chan in 1963 and is written in his book, A source book in Chinese Philosophy.

In 1967 Philip Yampolsky published a translation based on the Mogao Cave text. This translation is a landmark in the modern Western scholarship on Zen and its history.

Charles Luk translated the sutra as "The Dharma Treasure of the Altar Sutra of the Sixth Patriarch" which was published in Ch'an and Zen Teachings (Third Series, 1973).

John McRae translated the longer Yuan dynasty-era composite edition. It was published by Bukkyō Dendō Kyōkai.

Tripitaka Master Hsuan Hua commented on the Sixth Patriarch Sutra. The sutra and commentary were published by the Buddhist Text Translation Society as The Sixth Patriarch’s Dharma Jewel Platform Sutra (1971) 1st edition Hong Kong, (1977) 2nd edition, San Francisco, (2002) 3rd edition Burlingame,

Shoemaker & Hoard published a translation and commentary by the American writer Red Pine, based on the second Mogao Caves text, in 2006.

Martin Verhoeven and Rev. Heng Sure, disciples of Tripitaka Master Hsuan Hua, edited an edition based on the Chinese Zongbao Taisho Volume 48, Number 2008, in August 2014.

== See also ==
- Enlightenment in Buddhism

== Sources ==
- Addiss, Stephen; Lombardo, Stanley; Roitman, Judith (January 2008). Zen sourcebook : traditional documents from China, Korea, and Japan. Indianapolis: Hackett Pub. Co. ISBN 9780872209091. OCLC 173243878.
- Heine, Steven (2008). Zen Skin, Zen Marrow.
- McRae, John (2000). The Platform Sutra of the Sixth Patriarch. Translated from the Chinese of Zongbao (PDF). Berkeley: Numata Center for Buddhist Translation and Research.
- McRae, John (2003). Seeing Through Zen. Encounter, Transformation, and Genealogy in Chinese Chan Buddhism. The University Press Group Ltd. ISBN 978-0-520-23798-8.
- Schlütter, Morten (2007). "Transmission and Enlightenment in Chan Buddhism Seen Through the Platform Sūtra" (PDF). Chung-hwa Buddhist Journal (20). Taipei: 396.
- Verhoeven, Martin (2014), The Sixth Patriarch's Dharma Jewel Platform Sutra, Burlingame: Buddhist Text Translation Society, ISBN 978-1-60103-070-2
- Yampolski, Philip B. (1967). The platform sutra of the sixth patriarch: the text of the Tun-huang manuscript with translation, introduction, and notes (PDF). Columbia University Press. ISBN 978-0-231-08361-4. Archived from the original (PDF) on May 21, 2014.
