= Non-abidance =

In Buddhism, especially the Chan (Zen) traditions, non-abidance (in Sanskrit: apratiṣṭhita, with the a- prefix, lit. ‘unlimited’, ‘unlocalized’) refers to being unfixed and without dwelling.

Some schools of Buddhism, especially the Mahāyāna, consider apratiṣṭhita-nirvāṇa ("non-abiding cessation") to be the highest form of Buddhahood, more profound than pratiṣṭhita-nirvāṇa, the ‘localized’, lesser form. According to Robert Buswell and Donald Lopez, apratiṣṭhita-nirvāṇa is the standard Mahayana view of Buddhahood, which enables them to freely return to samsara in order to help sentient beings, while still remaining in nirvāṇa and being a buddha via the usage of the nirmanakaya and sambhogakaya.

== Term ==
Here, abide is used to translate pratiṣṭhita, meaning "to be contained in [a locale]" or "situated", from the prefix prati- ('towards', 'in the direction of') and ṣṭhita ('established', 'set up').

To translate pratiṣṭhita, Chinese Buddhists used zhù (住), literally "to reside, lodge, remain". Both wúsuǒzhù (無所住 'no means of staying') and wúzhù (無住 'not staying') are used for apratiṣṭhita.

== Sutras ==
The Diamond Sutra, a classic Buddhist text, is primarily concerned with the idea of non-abidance. The concept seems to have originated with the 1st-century Buddhist philosopher Nagarjuna, whose version of śūnyatā, or emptiness, entails that entities neither exist, nor do they not exist. The Platform Sutra relates how the spiritual patriarch Huineng attained sudden enlightenment after hearing his master Hongren reciting from the Diamond Sutra:

Responding to the non-abiding, yet generating the mind.
(應無所住，而生其心。 Yìng wúsuǒzhù, er sheng qi xin.)

Huineng then responds that self-nature is intrinsically pure, cannot be generated or extinguished, is self-sufficient and capable of generating dharmas, though this response is absent in the older Dunhuang version of the text.

The scholar-monk Qisong (契嵩) also noted in his foreword of the Platform Sutra:

The formless is the essence. (無相為體 wúxiang wei ti)
Non-thought is the tenet. (無念為宗 wúnian wei zong)
Non-abiding is the fundamental. (無住為本 wúzhù wei ben)

Non-abiding leads to prajñā (wisdom), as it enables one to consider that worldly issues are empty, so there is no point in retaliation or disputes.
