= List of Padma Bhushan award recipients (2020–2029) =

List of recipients of a civilian award in India

Padma Bhushan
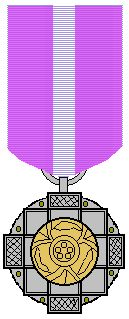
- Type: National Civilian
- Country: India
- Presented by: Government of India
- Ribbon
- Obverse: A centrally located lotus flower is embossed and the text "Padma" written in Devanagari script is placed above and the text "Bhushan" is placed below the lotus.
- Reverse: A platinum State Emblem of India placed in the centre with the national motto of India, "Satyameva Jayate" (Truth alone triumphs) in Devanagari Script
- Established: 1954
- First award: 1954

Precedence
- Next (higher): Padma Vibhushan

- Next (lower): Padma Shri

The Padma Bhushan is the third-highest civilian award of the Republic of India. Instituted on 2 January 1954, the award is given for "distinguished service of a high order", without distinction of race, occupation, position, or sex. The recipients receive a Sanad, a certificate signed by the President of India and a circular-shaped medallion with no monetary association. The recipients are announced every year on Republic Day (26 January) and registered in The Gazette of India—a publication used for official government notices and released weekly by the Department of Publication, under the Ministry of Urban Development. The conferral of the award is not considered official without its publication in the Gazette. The name of a recipient, whose award has been revoked or restored, both of which require the authority of the President, is archived and they are required to surrender their medal when their name is struck from the register. As of 2019, none of the conferments of Padma Bhushan during 2010s have been revoked or restored. The recommendations are received from all the state and the union territory governments, as well as from Ministries of the Government of India, the Bharat Ratna and the Padma Vibhushan awardees, the Institutes of Excellence, the Ministers, the Chief Ministers and the Governors of State, and the Members of Parliament including private individuals.

When instituted in 1954, the Padma Bhushan was classified as "Dusra Warg" (Class II) under the three-tier Padma Vibhushan awards, which were preceded by the Bharat Ratna in hierarchy. On 15 January 1955, the Padma Vibhushan was reclassified into three different awards as the Padma Vibhushan, the Padma Bhushan and the Padma Shri. The criteria included "distinguished service of a high order in any field including service rendered by Government servants", but excluded those working with the public sector undertakings with the exception of doctors and scientists. The 1954 statutes did not allow posthumous awards; this was subsequently modified in the January 1955 statute. The design was also changed to the form that is currently in use; it portrays a circular-shaped toned bronze medallion 1 3/4 inches (44 mm) in diameter and 1/8 inch (3.2 mm) thick. The centrally placed pattern made of outer lines of a square of 1 3/16 inches (30 mm) side is embossed with a knob carved within each of the outer angles of the pattern. A raised circular space of diameter 1 1/16 inches (27 mm) is placed at the centre of the decoration. A centrally located lotus flower is embossed on the obverse side of the medal and the text "Padma" is placed above and the text "Bhushan" is placed below the lotus written in Devanagari script. The State Emblem of India is displayed in the centre of the reverse side, together with the national motto of India, "Satyameva Jayate" (Truth alone triumphs) in Devanagari script, which is inscribed on the lower edge. The rim, the edges and all embossing on either side is of standard gold with the text "Padma Bhushan" of gold gilt. The medal is suspended by a pink riband 1 1/4 inches (32 mm) in width with a broad white stripe in the middle. It is ranked fifth in the order of precedence of wearing of medals and decorations of the Indian civilian and military awards. (Note: The order of precedence is: Bharat Ratna, Param Vir Chakra, Ashoka Chakra, Padma Vibhushan and Padma Bhushan.)

As of 2026, a total of 81 individuals have been conferred with the award and have been conferred upon six foreign recipients – one from Bangladesh and Mexico each and six from the United States of America. Individuals from ten different fields were awarded, which includes one from medical field, two civil servants, sportspersons and from Science & Engineering field each, three from social work, seven artists, eight from literature and education, nine from trade and industry, eleven from public affairs, and six from other fields. Most recently on 25 January 2026, the award has been bestowed upon thirteen recipients.

== Overview ==
Award recipients by year
Year	Number of recipients
2020	16
2021	10
2022	16
2023	9
2024	17
2025	19
2026	13

Award recipients by field
Field	Number of recipients
Arts	7
Civil Service	2
Literature & Education	8
Medicine	1
Others	6
Public Affairs	11
Science & Engineering	2
Social Work	3
Sports	2
Trade & Industry	9

== Recipients ==
Key
+ Naturalised citizen recipient	* Non-citizen recipient	# Posthumous recipient

List of Padma Bhushan award recipients (2020–2029)
Year	Image	Laureates	Field	State / country
2020		Sri M	Others	Kerala
2020		Syed Muazzem Ali*# (Note: Syed Muazzem Ali died on 30 December 2019, at the age of 75.)	Public Affairs	Bangladesh
2020		Muzaffar Hussain Baig	Public Affairs	Jammu and Kashmir
2020		Ajoy Chakrabarty	Arts	West Bengal
2020		Manoj Das	Literature and Education	Puducherry
2020		Balkrishna Vithaldas Doshi	Others	Gujarat
2020		Krishnammal Jagannathan	Social Work	Tamil Nadu
2020		S. C. Jamir	Public Affairs	Nagaland
2020		Anil Prakash Joshi	Social Work	Uttarakhand
2020		Tsering Landol	Medicine	Ladakh
2020		Anand Mahindra	Trade and Industry	Maharashtra
2020		N. R. Madhava Menon# (Note: N. R. Madhava Menon died on 8 May 2019, at the age of 84.)	Public Affairs	Kerala
2020		Manohar Parrikar# (Note: Manohar Parrikar died on 17 March 2019, at the age of 63.)	Public Affairs	Goa
2020		Jagdish Sheth*	Literature and Education	United States
2020		P. V. Sindhu	Sports	Telangana
2020		Venu Srinivasan	Trade and Industry	Maharashtra
2020		Sumitra Mahajan	Public Affairs	Madhya Pradesh
2021		K. S. Chithra	Arts	Kerala
2021		Tarun Gogoi# (Note: Tarun Gogoi died on 23 November 2020, at the age of 84.)	Public Affairs	Assam
2021		Chandrashekhara Kambara	Literature and Education	Karnataka
2021		Nripendra Misra	Civil Service	Uttar Pradesh
2021		Ram Vilas Paswan# (Note: Ram Vilas Paswan died on 8 October 2020, at the age of 74.)	Public Affairs	Bihar
2021		Keshubhai Patel# (Note: Keshubhai Patel died on 29 October 2020, at the age of 90.)	Public Affairs	Gujarat
2021		Kalbe Sadiq# (Note: Kalbe Sadiq died on 24 November 2020, at the age of 82.)	Others	Uttar Pradesh
2021		Rajnikant Shroff	Trade and Industry	Maharashtra
2021		Tarlochan Singh	Public Affairs	Haryana
2022		Ghulam Nabi Azad	Public Affairs	Jammu and Kashmir
2022		Gurmeet Bawa# (Note: Gurmeet Bawa died on 21 November 2021, at the age of 77.)	Arts	Punjab
2022		Natarajan Chandrasekaran	Trade and Industry	Maharashtra
2022		Madhur Jaffrey*	Others	United States
2022		Devendra Jhajharia	Sports	Rajasthan
2022		Rashid Khan	Arts	Uttar Pradesh
2022		Rajiv Mehrishi	Civil Service	Rajasthan
2022		Satya Nadella*	Trade and Industry	United States
2022		Sundar Pichai*	Trade and Industry	United States
2022		Cyrus S. Poonawalla	Trade and Industry	Maharashtra
2022		Sanjaya Rajaram*# (Note: Sanjaya Rajaram died on 17 February 2021, at the age of 78.)	Science and Engineering	Mexico
2022		Pratibha Ray	Literature and Education	Odisha
2022		Swami Sachchidanand	Literature and Education	Gujarat
2022		Vashishth Tripathi	Literature and Education	Uttar Pradesh
2022		Krishna Ella	Trade and Industry	Telangana
2022		Suchitra Ella	Trade and Industry	Telangana
2022		Victor Banerjee	Arts	West Bengal
2023		S. L. Bhyrappa	Literature and Education	Karnataka
2023		Kumar Mangalam Birla	Trade and Industry	Maharashtra
2023		Deepak Dhar	Science and Engineering	Maharashtra
2023		Vani Jairam	Arts	Tamil Nadu
2023		Chinna Jeeyar	Others	Telangana
2023		Suman Kalyanpur	Arts	Maharashtra
2023		Kapil Kapoor	Literature and Education	Delhi
2023		Sudha Murthy	Social Work	Karnataka
2023		Kamlesh Patel	Others	Telangana
2024		Fathima Beevi# (Note: Fathima Beevi died on 23 November 2023, at the age of 96.)	Public Affairs	Kerala
2024		Hormusji N. Cama	Literature and Education	Maharashtra
2024		Mithun Chakraborty	Arts	West Bengal
2024		Sitaram Jindal	Trade and Industry	Karnataka
2024		Young Liu*	Trade and Industry	Taiwan
2024		Ashwin Balachand Mehta	Medicine	Maharashtra
2024		Satyabrata Mookherjee# (Note: Satyabrata Mookherjee died on 3 March 2023, at the age of 90.)	Public Affairs	West Bengal
2024		Ram Naik	Public Affairs	Maharashtra
2024		Tejas Patel	Medicine	Gujarat
2024		O. Rajagopal	Public Affairs	Kerala
2024		Rajdutt	Arts	Maharashtra
2024		Togdan Rinpoche# (Note: Togdan Rinpoche died on 24 May 2023, at the age of 85.)	Others	Ladakh
2024		Pyarelal Sharma	Arts	Maharashtra
2024		C. P. Thakur	Medicine	Bihar
2024		Usha Uthup	Arts	West Bengal
2024		Vijayakanth# (Note: Vijayakant died on 28 December 2023, at the age of 71.)	Arts	Tamil Nadu
2024		Kundan Vyas	Literature and Education	Maharashtra
2025		A. Surya Prakash	Literature and Education	Karnataka
2025		Anant Nag	Arts	Karnataka
2025		Bibek Debroy# (Note: Bibek Debroy died on 1 November 2024, at the age of 69.)	Literature and Education	Delhi
2025		Jatin Goswami	Arts	Assam
2025		Jose Chacko Periappuram	Medicine	Kerala
2025		Kailash Nath Dikshit	Others	Delhi
2025		Manohar Joshi# (Note: Manohar Joshi died on 23 February 2024, at the age of 86.)	Public Affairs	Maharashtra
2025		Nalli Kuppuswami Chetti	Trade and Industry	Tamil Nadu
2025		Nandamuri Balakrishna	Arts	Andhra Pradesh
2025		P. R. Sreejesh	Sports	Kerala
2025		Pankaj Patel	Trade and Industry	Gujarat
2025		Pankaj Udhas# (Note: Pankaj Udhas died on 26 February 2024, at the age of 72.)	Arts	Maharashtra
2025		Ram Bahadur Rai	Literature and Education	Uttar Pradesh
2025		Sadhvi Rithambara	Social Work	Uttar Pradesh
2025		Ajith Kumar	Arts	Tamil Nadu
2025		Shekhar Kapur	Arts	Maharashtra
2025		Shobana	Arts	Kerala
2025		Sushil Kumar Modi# (Note: Sushil Kumar Modi died on 13 May 2024, at the age of 72.)	Public Affairs	Bihar
2025		Vinod Dham*	Science and Engineering	United States
2026		Alka Yagnik	Arts	Maharashtra
2026		Bhagat Singh Koshyari	Public Affairs	Uttarakhand
2026		K. R. Palaniswamy	Medicine	Tamil Nadu
2026		Mammootty	Arts	Kerala
2026		Nori Dattatreyudu*	Medicine	United States
2026		Piyush Pandey# (Note: Piyush Pandey died on 23 October 2025, at the age of 70.)	Arts	Maharashtra
2026		S. K. M. Maeilanandhan	Social Work	Tamil Nadu
2026		Shatavadhani R. Ganesh	Arts	Karnataka
2026		Shibu Soren# (Note: Shibu Soren died on 4 August 2025, at the age of 81.)	Public Affairs	Jharkhand
2026		Uday Kotak	Trade and Industry	Maharashtra
2026		Vijay Kumar Malhotra# (Note: Vijay Kumar Malhotra died on 30 September 2025, at the age of 93.)	Public Affairs	Delhi
2026		Vellappally Natesan	Public Affairs	Kerala
2026		Vijay Amritraj*	Sports	United States

== Explanatory notes ==
Posthumous recipients
