= The Tibetan Book of the Dead: A Way of Life =

- DVD cover
- Directed by: Yukari Hayashi
- Produced by: Atsunori Kawamura
- Starring: Togdan Rinpoche; Ram Dass; The Dalai Lama
- Narrated by: Leonard Cohen
- Music by: Toshiyuki Honda
- Distributed by: NHK; National Film Board of Canada
- Release date: 1994
- Running time: 90 minutes
- Countries: Japan; Canada
- Language: English

The Tibetan Book of the Dead: A Way of Life is a 1994 two-part multimedia documentary directed by Yukari Hayashi about the Bardo Thodol from Tibetan Vajrayana Buddhism. It is narrated by singer-poet Leonard Cohen and includes passages from the 1975 English translation of the Bardo Thodol by Chögyam Trungpa and Francesca Fremantle, titled The Tibetan Book of the Dead: The Great Liberation through Hearing in the Bardo by Guru Rinpoche according to Karma Lingpa. The film was made by NHK and the National Film Board of Canada, mainly with a Japanese production crew.

== Summary ==
=== Part One: A Way of Life ===
The film goes over Tibetan beliefs and teachings regarding death and dying, including rites and liturgies for a deceased Ladakhi elder and a San Francisco hospice that uses the Bardo Thodol teachings to console patients dying of AIDS. Ram Dass and the Dalai Lama make appearances to speak on death.

=== Part Two: The Great Liberation ===
The second half of the film follows Tibetan-Ladakhi monastics, specifically a young monk and his Tibetan exile teacher. The Tibetan's teachings are accompanied by elaborate hand-drawn animation by Ishu Patel to depict the 49-day journey towards rebirth, including the bardo.

== Production ==
The NHK crew filmed over a four-month period on-location in the Ladakh region of the Himalayas.

== Reception ==
CM Magazine wrote that "Leonard Cohen's narration ... was perfect. No one else could have succeeded so brilliantly at calmly and richly presenting this series," and CM Magazine wrote that "The cinematography is breathtaking: snow-capped, mighty mountains pinpricked by isolated towns provide suitable images of insignificant humanity in a vast, lonely, and hostile universe. Yet this view is juxtaposed with a sensitive portrayal of Tibetan Buddhism's central tenet: To seek truth and practice compassion is the meaning and purpose of life," and Canadian Content noted that "Leonard Cohen's narration ... was perfect. No one else could have succeeded so brilliantly at calmly and richly presenting this series."
