= CNTM =

CNTM may stand for:

- Canada's Next Top Model, a TV show
- Caribbean's Next Top Model, a TV show
- China's Next Top Model, a TV show
- Colombia's Next Top Model, a TV show
- Confédération Nationale des Travailleurs de Mauritanie, member of the International Trade Union Confederation
- Confederação Nacional dos Trabalhadores Metalúrgicos (Brazilian Metalworkers' Union), affiliated with Foxconn
- Consiliul Național al Tineretului din Moldova, member of the European Youth Forum
