= Zhitro =

Teachings in Tibetan Buddhism and Bon

In Tibetan Buddhism and Bön, Zhitro (Standard Tibetan: ཞི་ཁྲོ) or Shitro zab-chos zhi khro dgongs pa rang grol, also known as kar-gling zhi-khro refers to a cycle of teachings revealed by the terton Karma Lingpa and traditionally believed to have been written by Padmasambhava. The practices involve a mandala of 100 peaceful (zhi) and wrathful (khro) tantric deities and associated teachings and tantric practices which focus on those deities which represent the purified elements of the body and mind. These hundred peaceful and wrathful deities are believed to manifest to a deceased person following the dissolution of the body and consciousness whilst they are in the intermediate state, or bardo, between death and rebirth. The Bardo Thodol, commonly known in the West as "The Tibetan Book of the Dead", forms one section of Karma Lingpa's Zhitro cycle. The Zhitro teachings are closely related to the Guhyagarbha Tantra and are considered an Inner Tantra.

== Exegesis ==
A prominent sadhana, or practice text, is part of a group of bardo teachings which are held in the Nyingma tradition to have originated with Padmasambhava in the 8th century and were rediscovered as terma, or 'treasure teachings' in the 14th century by the tertön Karma Lingpa. The Zhitro mandala teachings were found in the same terma collection as the Bardo Thodol, a text well known in the West as The Tibetan Book of the Dead. According to tradition, after Yeshe Tsogyal was robbed by seven bandits, she converted them to Buddhist practice and brought them to Oḍḍiyāna by magic carpet. It was there that they received Zhitro through the wang of a Vidyadhara, who gave Tsogyal the secret name Kharchen Za and cavorted in bliss with her.

The Dzogchen practice of Zhitro involves viewing the body as a mandala of both peaceful and wrathful deities, the inclusivity promoting awareness in the practitioner of the universality of Buddha-nature. As a subtle body practice using yogic practices to manipulate the lung, or subtle-winds, of the body, this is a completion stage practice of the Inner Tantras. The Lion's Roar Tantric Glossary describes the Zhitro mandala practice as a visualization of the body composed of 100 deities, 42 of which are peaceful and 58 of which are wrathful, located in the heart, throat, and crown cakras and in the nāḍis, or subtle body channels.

Shugchang, et al. (2000) define and frame the Zhitro teachings as "one that unifies everything into a single state." They depict Zhitro as "the inner tantra of the inner tantra", which, in a condensed form, expresses the meaning of the Guhyagarbha tantra combined with the views of Anuyoga and Atiyoga teachings. It reflects the union of rigpa and emptiness and the non-duality of birth, death, and life experiences.

== See also ==
- Bardo
- Bardo Thodol
- Guhyagarbha Tantra
- Six realms
- Reality in Buddhism
- Tantra techniques (Vajrayana)
