= BYD Brazil working conditions controversy =

On December 23, 2024, the Brazilian Labour Public Ministry and other agencies conducted a surprise inspection of the construction site of the Chinese company BYD Auto in Camaçari, Bahia, Brazil. The inspection found that the living and working conditions of 163 Chinese workers were extremely poor. The Brazilian authorities condemned the conditions as "degrading" and "slavery-like" and have suspended the issuance of visas to BYD workers until their legal rights are guaranteed. Brazilian prosecutors filed a lawsuit against BYD in May 2025.

== Findings ==
The Brazilian authorities found that the workers could not leave their dormitories without permission, were forced to work long hours without weekly breaks, and were deprived of wages and passports. Their living quarters were overcrowded and lacked basic amenities, including sufficient toilets and refrigeration for food. Brazilian labour authorities stated that the workers are victims of human trafficking.

The Brazilian authorities condemned such working conditions as "degrading" and "slavery-like" and have suspended the issuance of visas to BYD workers until their legal rights are guaranteed.

The site was shut down, and the 163 workers at the site were moved to hotel accommodations until a deal to end their contracts was reached. By 8 January 2025, all the workers had received termination payments and returned to China.

== Reactions ==
After the inspection, the BYD Auto Brazil branch admitted that there were problems with the working conditions and had relocated the workers to local hotels.

Jinjiang Group, the contractor for BYD, stated that they rejected Brazilian authorities assessment that the workers are operating under "slave-like" conditions. Jinjiang stated that the statement that the workers are "enslaved" are not accurate and there were mistranslations. BYD at first stated their plan to discontinue the contract with the Jinjiang, but later refused to do so. Li Yunfei, the General Manager of BYD Group's Brand and Public Relations Department posted on Weibo accusing "foreign forces" of "smearing Chinese brands and the country".

Liane Durao, a Brazilian labour inspector that leads the probe stated to Reuters that the Chinese workers are brought to Brazil on an irregular visa.

The case triggered a backlash on Chinese social media against BYD, opening a discussion over worker rights. Some Chinese Internet users said living conditions for the workers in Brazil were typical of those found on construction sites in China.

In May 2025, Brazilian prosecutors filed a lawsuit against BYD, alleging human trafficking and holding workers in "slavery-like conditions."

In April 2026, Brazil's Labor Ministry published a list in which the Brazilian government put BYD on a ‌registry of employers who have subjected workers to conditions similar to slavery. BYD was also banned from obtaining certain types of loans from Brazilian banks.

== See also ==
- Allegations of human rights violations in Belt and Road Initiative
- Foxconn and unions § Brazil
