= Bardo Thodol =

Tibetan Book of the Dead

Tibetan name
- Tibetan: བར་དོ་ཐོས་གྲོལ་
Transcriptions
- Wylie: bar do thos grol
- THL: Bardo Thödröl
- Lhasa IPA: Tibetan pronunciation: [pʰaː˩˨.ˌtʰo.tʰø˥˥.ˈʈʰ~ʈʂʰøː]

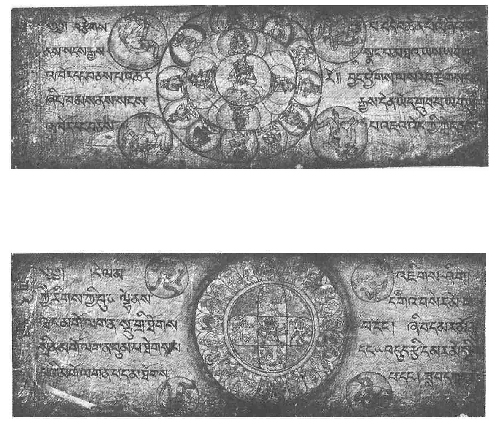
Manuscript of the Bardo Thodol.

The Bardo Thodol (Tibetan: བར་དོ་ཐོས་གྲོལ, Wylie: bar do thos grol, 'Liberation through hearing during the intermediate state'), commonly known in the West as The Tibetan Book of the Dead, is a terma text from a larger corpus of teachings, the Profound Dharma of Self-Liberation through the Intention of the Peaceful and Wrathful Ones, (Note: zab-chos zhi khro dgongs pa rang grol, also known as kar-gling zhi-khro) revealed by Karma Lingpa (1326–1386). It is the best-known work of Nyingma literature. In 1927, the text was one of the first examples of both Tibetan and Vajrayana literature to be translated into a European language and arguably continues to this day to be the best known.

The Tibetan text describes, and is intended to guide one through, the experiences that the consciousness has after death, in the bardo, the interval between death and the next rebirth. The text also includes chapters on the signs of death and rituals to undertake when death is closing in or has taken place. The text can be used as either an advanced practice for trained meditators or to support the uninitiated during the death experience.

== Etymology ==
Bar do thos grol (Tibetan: བར་དོ་ཐོས་གྲོལ, Wylie: bar do thos grol, THL: bardo thödrol) translates as: “Liberation (grol) through Hearing (thos) in the Intermediate State (bardo)”

- The Tibetan bar and its Sanskrit equivalent antarā mean ‘between.’ The Sanskrit bhava means a place of existence. Thus antarābhava means ‘an existence between,’ translated into Tibetan as bardo.
- thos grol: thos means hearing. Grol means ‘liberation,’ which may be understood in this context as being synonymous with the Sanskrit bodhi, "awakening", "understanding", "enlightenment", as well as with the term nirvāṇa, "blowing out", "extinction", "the extinction of illusion". Grol has connotations of freeing, liberating, unravelling, becoming undone.

== Original text ==
=== Origins and dating ===
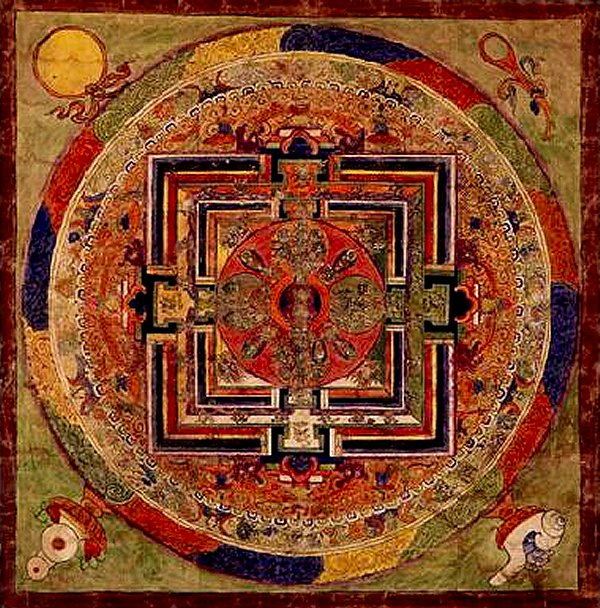
Centuries old Zhi-Khro mandala, a part of the Bardo Thodol's collection, a text known in the West as The Tibetan Book of the Dead, which comprises part of a group of bardo teachings held in the Nyingma (Tibetan tradition) originated with guru Padmasambhava in the 8th century.

According to Tibetan tradition, the Liberation Through Hearing During the Intermediate State was composed in the 8th century by Padmasambhava, written down by his primary student, Yeshe Tsogyal, buried in the Gampo hills in central Tibet and subsequently discovered by a Tibetan terton, Karma Lingpa, in the 14th century.

=== bar do thos grol ===
The Tibetan title is bar do thos grol, Liberation Through Hearing During the Intermediate State. It consists of two comparatively long texts:

- "Great Liberation through Hearing: The Supplication of the Bardo of Dharmata" (chos nyid bar do'i gsol 'debs thos grol chen mo), the bardo of dharmata (including the bardo of dying);
- "Great Liberation through Hearing: The Supplication Pointing Out the Bardo of Existence" (strid pa'i bar do ngo sprod gsol 'debs thos grol chen mo), the bardo of existence.

Within the texts themselves, the two combined are referred to as Liberation through Hearing in the Bardo, Great Liberation through Hearing, or just Liberation through Hearing. (Note: In Tibetan, bar do thos grol, thos grol chen mo, and thos grol)

=== kar-gling zhi-khro ===
It is part of a larger terma cycle, Profound Dharma of Self-Liberation through the Intention of the Peaceful and Wrathful Ones (zab-chos zhi khro dgongs pa rang grol, also known as kar-gling zhi-khro), popularly known as "Karma Lingpa's Peaceful and Wrathful Ones." Another well-known work from this cycle is Self-liberation through seeing with naked awareness.

The Profound Dharma of Self-Liberation is known in several versions, containing varying numbers of sections and subsections, and arranged in different orders, ranging from around ten to thirty-eight titles. The individual texts cover a wide range of subjects, including meditation instructions, visualizations of deities, liturgies and prayers, lists of mantras, descriptions of the signs of death, indications of future rebirth, and texts such as the bar do thos grol that are concerned with the bardo-state.

=== Three bardos ===
The Bardo Thodol differentiates the intermediate state between lives into three bardos:

1. The chikhai bardo or "bardo of the moment of death", which features the experience of the "clear light of reality", or at least the nearest approximation of which one is spiritually capable;
2. The chonyid bardo or "bardo of the experiencing of reality", which features the experience of visions of various Buddha forms, or the nearest approximations of which one is capable;
3. The sidpa bardo or "bardo of rebirth", which features karmically impelled hallucinations which eventually result in rebirth, typically yab-yum imagery of men and women passionately entwined.

The Liberation Through Hearing During the Intermediate State also mentions three other bardos: (Note: See also Trikaya, Kosha and Three Bodies Doctrine (Vedanta))

1. "Life", or ordinary waking consciousness;
2. "Dhyana" (meditation);
3. "Dream", the dream state during normal sleep.

Together these "six bardos" form a classification of states of consciousness into six broad types. Any state of consciousness can form a type of "intermediate state", intermediate between other states of consciousness. Indeed, one can consider any momentary state of consciousness a bardo, since it lies between our past and future existences; it provides us with the opportunity to experience reality, which is always present but obscured by the projections and confusions that are due to our previous unskillful actions.

== English translations ==
=== Evans-Wentz's The Tibetan Book of the Dead ===
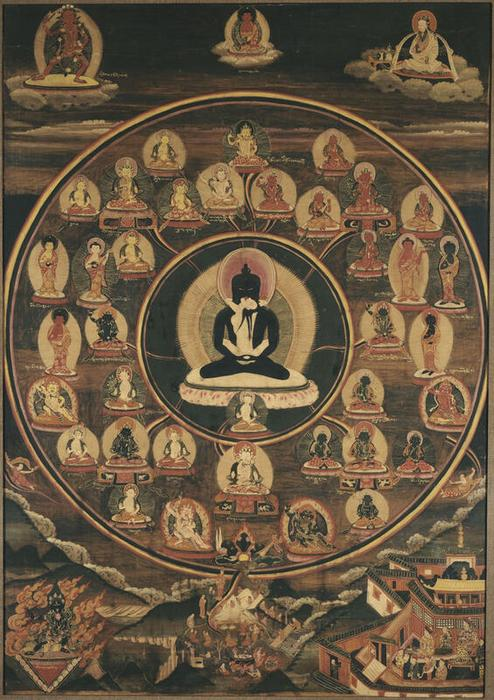
Tibetan Thanka of Bardo. Vision of Serene Deities, 19th century, Guimet Museum

The bar do thos grol has become known in the English speaking world as The Tibetan Book of the Dead, a title popularized by Walter Evans-Wentz's edition, after the Egyptian Book of the Dead, though the English title bears no relationship with the Tibetan's, as outlined above. The Evans-Wentz edition was first published in 1927 by Oxford University Press.

According to John Myrdhin Reynolds, Evans-Wentz's edition of the Tibetan Book of the Dead introduced a number of misunderstandings about Dzogchen. In fact, Evans-Wentz collected seven texts about visualization of the after-death experiences and he introduced this work collection as "The Tibetan Book of Death." Evans-Wentz was well acquainted with Theosophy and used this framework to interpret the translation of The Tibetan Book of the Dead, which was largely provided by two Tibetan lamas who spoke English, Lama Sumdhon Paul and Lama Lobzang Mingnur Dorje. Evans-Wentz was not familiar with Tibetan Buddhism, and his view of Tibetan Buddhism was "fundamentally neither Tibetan nor Buddhist, but Theosophical and Vedantist." He introduced a terminology into the translation which was largely derived from Hinduism, as well as from his Theosophical beliefs.

The third revised and expanded Evans-Wentz edition of The Tibetan Book of the Dead contains a psychological commentary by Carl Jung in an English translation by R. F. C. Hull. The commentary also appears in the Collected Works. Jung applied his extensive knowledge of eastern religion to craft a commentary specifically aimed at a western audience unfamiliar with eastern religious tradition in general and Tibetan Buddhism specifically. He does not attempt to directly correlate the content of the Bardo Thodol with rituals or dogma found in occidental religion but rather highlights karmic phenomena described on the Bardo plane and shows how they parallel unconscious contents (both personal and collective) encountered in the west, particularly in the context of analytical psychology. Jung's comments should be taken strictly within the realm of psychology, and not that of theology or metaphysics. Indeed, he warns repeatedly of the dangers for western man in the wholesale adoption of eastern religious traditions such as yoga.

=== Other translations and summaries ===
- Conze, Edward (1959) Buddhist Scriptures. Harmondsworth: Penguin (includes a précis)
- MacHovec, Frank (1972) The Tibetan Book of the Dead. Mount Vernon: Peter Pauper Press ISBN 978-0880885249
- Fremantle, Francesca & Chögyam Trungpa (1975) The Tibetan Book of the Dead: The Great Liberation through Hearing in the Bardo by Guru Rinpoche according to Karma Lingpa. Boulder: Shambhala ISBN 0-394-73064-X, ISBN 1-59030-059-9 (reissued 2003)
- Thurman, Robert (1994) The Tibetan Book of the Dead, as popularly known in the West; known in Tibet as "The Great Book of Natural Liberation Through Understanding in the Between"; composed by Padma Sambhava; discovered by Karma Lingpa; foreword by the Dalai Lama London: HarperCollins ISBN 1-85538-412-4
- Hodge, Stephen & Martin Boord (1999) The Illustrated Tibetan Book of the Dead: A New Translation and Commentary. New York: Sterling ISBN 978-0806970776
- Dorje, Gyurme (trans.); Graham Coleman and Thupten Jinpa (eds.) (2005) The Tibetan Book of the Dead [English title]: The Great Liberation by Hearing in the Intermediate States [Tibetan title]; composed by Padma Sambhava: revealed by Karma Lingpa. London: Penguin Books ISBN 978-0-14-045529-8 Also: New York: Viking Penguin, NY, 2006. ISBN 0-670-85886-2 (hc); ISBN 978-0-14-310494-0 (pbk) Reprinted in Penguin Classics; London: Penguin Books (2005) ISBN 0-7139-9414-2 (As of 2022, this remains the only translation of the complete cycle of texts of which the Tibetan Book of the Dead is part. Here it comprises chapter 11.)
- Related (from the same terma cycle)
  - Natural Liberation. 1998. Padmasambhava. B. Alan Wallace (translator), with commentary by Gyatrul Rinpoche. Wisdom Publications. Natural Liberation is from the same terma cycle and gives detailed instructions for practice within the six bardos.

== Popular influence ==
=== The Psychedelic Experience ===
The Psychedelic Experience, published in 1964, is a guide for LSD trips, written by Timothy Leary, Ralph Metzner and Richard Alpert (later known as Ram Dass), loosely based on Evan-Wentz's translation of the Tibetan Book of the Dead. Aldous Huxley introduced the Tibetan Book of the Dead to Timothy Leary. According to Leary, Metzner and Alpert, the Tibetan Book of the Dead is

... a key to the innermost recesses of the human mind, and a guide for initiates, and for those who are seeking the spiritual path of liberation.

They construed the effect of LSD as a "stripping away" of ego-defenses, finding parallels between the stages of death and rebirth in the Tibetan Book of the Dead, and the stages of psychological "death" and "rebirth" which Leary had identified during his research. According to Leary, Metzner and Alpert it is:

... one of the oldest and most universal practices for the initiate to go through the experience of death before he can be spiritually reborn. Symbolically he must die to his past, and to his old ego, before he can take his place in the new spiritual life into which he has been initiated.

=== Musical, cinematic, and literary works ===
- French composer Pierre Henry based his pioneering 1963 electroacoustic ballet work Le Voyage on the narrative of the text. A recording of the work was released by Philips in 1967.
- The song ‘Tomorrow Never Knows’ on the 1966 Beatles album Revolver was inspired by a version of the text – ‘When writing the song, Lennon drew inspiration from his experiences with the hallucinogenic drug LSD and from the 1964 book The Psychedelic Experience: A Manual Based on the Tibetan Book of the Dead by Timothy Leary, Richard Alpert and Ralph Metzner.’
- In 1974 Finnish composer Erik Bergman composed a work titled Bardo Thödol for a speaker, mezzo-soprano, baritone, mixed choir and orchestra; the text was based on a German translation of the Book of the Dead.
- 1994 two-part documentary filmed in Ladakh and the States, The Tibetan Book of the Dead: A Way of Life, was a co-production between NHK (Japan), Mistral (France) and FBC (Canada). Narration in the English version is by Leonard Cohen.
- Between 1983 and 1993 French composer Éliane Radigue created her three-hour work of electronic music, Trilogie de la Mort. Her Tibetan Buddhist meditation practise, including engagement with the Bardo Thodol after the deaths of her son and her meditation teacher, are central to this piece, in particular the first section entitled "Kyema (Intermediate States)".
- Screenwriter and film producer Bruce Joel Rubin, who once lived in a Tibetan Buddhist monastery, considers his 1990 film Jacob's Ladder a modern interpretation of the Bardo Thodol.
- Space rock band Bardo Pond, formed in Philadelphia, Pennsylvania in 1991, take their name in part from the Bardo Thodol.
- In 1991 The Tibetan Book of Living and Dying by Sogyal Rinpoche was published as a spiritual and practical development based on the Bardo Thodol.
- The song, "T.B.D" on the 1994 "Throwing Copper" album by the band Live, is about the Tibetan Book of the Dead.
- The Canadian band Mystery released the song "Queen of Vajra Space" on their 1998 album Destiny?.
- Enter the Void, a 2009 French film written and directed by Gaspar Noé, features the death of a young man, and his subsequent journey through the bardo.
- In 2019, avant-garde composer and performer Laurie Anderson, Tibetan musician Tenzin Choegyal and activist and composer Jesse Paris Smith recorded Songs from the Bardo: Illuminations on the Tibetan Book.
- The 2022 film Bardo, False Chronicle of a Handful of Truths directed by Alejandro González Iñárritu takes its title from the Tibetan Buddhist concept as it follows a docufiction filmmaker's existential crisis as told in dreamlike visions.
- The 2023 film Samsara contains a several-minutes-long scene of experimental audio-visual stimuli, during which the viewer is invited to imagine themselves in a bardo state.

== See also ==
- Left Ginza
- Reality in Buddhism
- Six realms
