= Young Liu =

Taiwanese business executive (born 1956)

Young-Way Liu
- 劉揚偉
- Born: 1956 (age 69–70); Taiwan
- Education: National Chiao Tung University (BS, PhD); University of Southern California (MS)
- Occupation: Business executive
- Organization: Hon Hai Precision Industry Co., Ltd. (Foxconn)
- Title: Chairman and President
- Term: 2019–present
- Predecessor: Terry Gou
- Awards: Padma Bhushan (2024)

Young-Way Liu (born 1956) is a Taiwanese business executive who serves as the chairman and president of Foxconn (Hon Hai Precision Industry). He was appointed to the position in 2019 following the retirement of the company’s founder, Terry Gou.

Under Liu’s leadership, Foxconn has pursued diversification beyond consumer electronics manufacturing, with increased focus on electric vehicles, semiconductors, digital health, and global supply-chain expansion.

In 2024, Liu was awarded the Padma Bhushan, India’s third-highest civilian award, for his contributions to trade and industry, particularly for strengthening manufacturing and industrial cooperation between India and Taiwan.

== Early life and education ==
Liu was born in 1956 in Taiwan. He earned a bachelor's degree in electrophysics from National Chiao Tung University in 1978. He later completed a master's degree in computer engineering at the University of Southern California in 1986. He subsequently obtained a doctoral degree from his alma mater, National Chiao Tung University.

== Career ==
Liu joined Foxconn in 2007 and held several senior management roles, including leading the company’s semiconductor and research initiatives.

In June 2019, he was appointed chairman and chief executive officer of Foxconn, marking the first time the company separated ownership from professional executive management at its top leadership level.

As CEO, Liu has promoted Foxconn’s "3+3" strategy, focusing on electric vehicles, digital health, and robotics, supported by core technologies such as artificial intelligence, semiconductors, and next-generation communications.

In addition to expanding Foxconn's electric vehicle and semiconductor businesses, Liu has positioned the company as a major player in artificial intelligence infrastructure. In 2025, he stated that Foxconn could manufacture up to 1,000 AI server racks per week to meet growing global demand.

Foxconn also announced plans to increase investments in AI-related manufacturing and cloud infrastructure, with Liu outlining a multi-billion dollar annual investment strategy to strengthen the company’s AI and data centre capabilities.

Under his leadership, the company has expanded its cooperation with global technology firms in AI hardware manufacturing.

Liu has also publicly commented on the impact of generative artificial intelligence on the manufacturing sector, stating that automation and AI may reduce demand for low-end manufacturing jobs while increasing the need for high-skilled technical roles.

Foxconn has continued expanding its investments in India during Liu’s tenure. In 2024, he indicated plans to further strengthen the company’s manufacturing footprint in the country and deepen industrial cooperation.

== Padma Bhushan ==
The Padma Bhushan (2024) was awarded to Liu by the Government of India for contributions to trade and industry, particularly in strengthening manufacturing cooperation between India and Taiwan.

He was among the 17 recipients of the Padma Bhushan in 2024 and was the only non-Indian citizen in that category that year.

The award was conferred during India's 75th Republic Day celebrations. Media commentary described the recognition as reflective of the growing economic and strategic engagement between India and Taiwan, particularly in electronics manufacturing and supply-chain cooperation.

== See also ==
- Padma Bhushan
- List of Padma Bhushan award recipients (2020–2029)
