= Foxconn and unions =

Trade unions at Foxconn facilities

Foxconn is the largest private employer in China with 1.4 million employees. With over a million members, Foxconn Trade Union is the world's largest trade union and also a company union dominated by management. It was established in 2006 in Shenzhen, China.

Similar to the situation in China, Foxconn has signed collective agreements with managerial friendly trade unions in India. In contrast, Foxconn has signed collective agreements with democratic trade unions in Brazil; in the Czech Republic, it inherited an existing union when it took over a former Tesla plant.

== China ==
Foxconn Trade Union
- 富士康科技集团工会联合会
- Formation: 2006
- Founded at: Foxconn City
- Headquarters: Shenzhen
- Location: China
- Members: 1,000,000+
- Owner: Foxconn
- Leader: Cheng Peng
- Affiliations: ACFTU
- Website: http://hhfox.com/portal.php

In the summer of 2006, British, Chinese and US press reported poor working conditions in an iPod factory operated by Foxconn. Apple promised to investigate, while Foxconn responded by suing two of the mainland journalists involved. Foxconn later dropped their lawsuit. In response to media pressure and local interventions by Shenzhen municipal state officials, Foxconn promised to form a union. However, nothing materialized by November 2006. On the last day of that year, the Shenzhen branch of the All-China Federation of Trade Unions took the unusual step of establishing Foxconn's first union, initially with 118 members from the 240,000 workers at the Longhua Science and Technology Park facility. In March 2007, Foxconn CEO Terry Gou's special personal assistant, Chen Peng, (Note: Sources use conflicting pronouns/titles for Chen Peng. Chen Peng is a woman according to the Financial Times and researcher Jenny Chan. She also goes by Peggy in the English language.) was elected as its first chair. Despite being the largest 'unionized' company in the world, with 90% of Foxconn's 1.4 million workforce registered; the Foxconn Federation of Labour Unions (Chinese: 富士康科技集团工会联合会), more commonly known as the Foxconn Trade Union (Chinese: 富士康工会) is a company union dominated by management rather than workers.

Foxconn again made global headlines in 2010, when over a dozen workers committed suicide due to strenuous working conditions. Apple responded by bringing in the Fair Labor Association, a US based NGO as external auditor from 2012 to 2016. One of the Association's findings was that the Foxconn Trade Union failed to adequately represent workers. The Economic Policy Institute criticized the FLA report for giving Apple and Foxconn 'undue' credit, despite ongoing issues including forced overtime and the continued use of underage labour. Foxconn promised in 2013 with the help of the Fair Labor Association to prepare genuine representative union elections through an anonymous voting process to elect up to 18,000 new union committees.

In a 2017 Students and Scholars Against Corporate Misbehaviour (SACOM) report, Jenny Chan criticized the limited worker participation inside the Foxconn Trade Union and the lack of awareness or involvement of workers in the first democratic union elections held in early 2015.

== Brazil ==
Foxconn do Brasil (Foxconn Brazil) opened its first plant in 2007 in Jundiaí, Brazil to manufacture parts for Dell, HP and Motorola. Workers are represented by the Brazilian Metalworkers' Union (Brazilian Portuguese: Confederação Nacional dos Trabalhadores Metalúrgicos; CNTM), an affiliate of IndustriALL.

In contrast to China, at the start of the 2010s workers in Brazil had higher wages, stronger labour protection and nearly double the minimum wage. In 2012, by the time Foxconn Brazil opened a second plant, also in Jundiaí, which focused exclusively on Apple products, CNTM already had experience organizing Foxconn workers at the first plant. After a 5-day strike in 2014 involving 3,700 workers, Foxconn made a collective agreement with the union to match their salaries with the higher paid, non-Apple contracted Foxconn workers. A prior strike happened in 2013 for similar demands.

== Czech Republic ==
Foxconn CZ s.r.o. (Foxconn Czech Republic) acquired what remained of the former state owned Tesla plants in both Pardubice and Kutná Hora, Czech Republic. As a result, it also inherited the prior existing trade union of OS KOVO, the metal workers affiliate of ČMKOS. Foxconn Czech Republic currently pays the salary of one trade union representative, while the union, using funds from property it inherited, pays for an economist.

The trade union and Foxconn Czech Republic negotiated their first collective agreement in 2000, with its first wage increase in 2002, with all future collective agreements including wage increases.

== India ==
Foxconn India Ltd (Foxconn India) opened in Sriperumbudur, 50 kilometers from Chennai, Tamil Nadu in 2006, primarily to provide parts for Nokia India. The factory was located inside the Nokia Special Economic Zone. Between 2010 and 2013, there was a dispute between three competing trade unions to represent the 2,000 Foxconn workers. Foxconn India initially recognized (Tamil: Foxconn India Thozhilalar Munnetra Sangam; FITMS) affiliated to the Labour Progressive Federation of the ruling DMK party, signing a wage pact with them. In October 2010, some 1,200 workers belong to the Foxconn India Employees Union (Foxconn India Thozhilalar Sangam; FIST), affiliated to the Centre of Indian Trade Unions of CPI(M). FIST started mobilizing in 2010, after a gas leak affected some 200 workers. According to FIST, former FITMS members transferred to FIST as a result. When AIADMK party came into power in 2013, Foxconn India made a wage pact with their respective union Panchalai Anna Thozhilalar Sangam, which was valid until 2016.

None of the Apple contract facilities are unionized as of 2023, but there was a non-successful attempt in Chennai in 2021, by 30 workers who were subsequently fired.

== See also ==
- Apple Inc. and unions
- IBM and unions
