= UPL Limited =

Indian multinational chemical company

- Formerly: United Phosphorus Limited (1969–2013)
- Type: Public
- Traded as: BSE: 512070; NSE: UPL
- ISIN: INE628A01036
- Industry: Agribusiness; Chemicals
- Founded: 29 May 1969; 57 years ago
- Founder: Rajnikant Shroff
- Headquarters: Mumbai, Maharashtra, India
- Area served: Worldwide
- Key people: Rajnikant Shroff (Chairman & MD); Jaidev Shroff (CEO)
- Products: Agrochemicals; Specialty chemicals
- Revenue: ▲₹53,576 crore (US$5.7 billion) (FY23)
- Operating income: ▲₹11,178 crore (US$1.2 billion) (FY23)
- Net income: ▼₹3,569 crore (US$380 million) (FY23)
- Total assets: ▲₹82,679 crore (US$8.8 billion) (2022)
- Total equity: ▲₹24,661 crore (US$2.6 billion) (2022)
- Owners: Nerka Chemicals Pvt Ltd (20.10%); Life Insurance Corporation (8.41%); Uniphos Enterprises Ltd (5.11%)
- Number of employees: 10,000+ (FY21)
- Website: upl-ltd.com

UPL Limited, formerly United Phosphorus Limited, is an Indian multinational company that manufactures and markets agrochemicals, industrial chemicals, chemical intermediates, and specialty chemicals. Headquartered in Mumbai, the company is primarily engaged in the manufacture and marketing of conventional agrochemicals, seeds, and other agriculture-related products. It also manufactures fungicides, herbicides, insecticides, plant growth regulators, rodenticides, industrial and specialty chemicals, and nutrifeeds.

United Phosphorus Limited was established on 29 May 1969. The company changed its name to UPL Limited in October 2013.

On 20 July 2018, UPL signed a US$4.2 billion agreement with Platform Specialty Products Corporation (now Element Solutions Inc.) to acquire control of Arysta LifeScience Inc. The acquisition was completed in February 2019, making UPL the fifth largest generic agrochemicals company in the world after Bayer, Corteva, Syngenta and BASF.
