= Bardo =

Buddhist concept

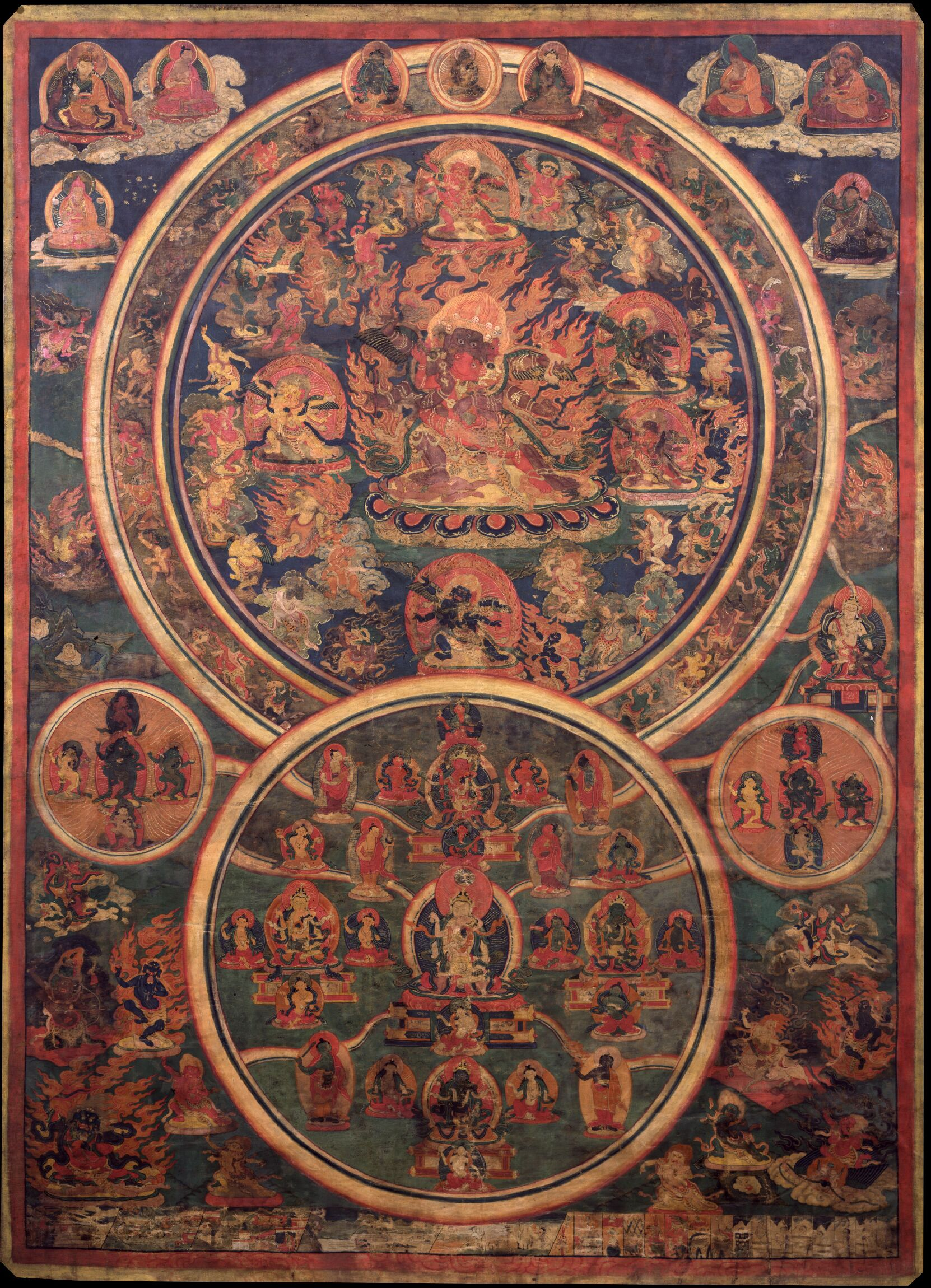
Tibetan illustration of the Peaceful and Wrathful Deities of the post-mortem intermediate state (bardo). Some Tibetan Buddhists hold that when a being goes through the intermediate state, they will have visions of various deities.

In some schools of Buddhism, bardo (Classical Tibetan: བར་དོ་ Wylie: bar do) or antarābhava (Sanskrit, Chinese and Japanese: 中有, romanized in Chinese as zhōng yǒu and in Japanese as chū'u) is an intermediate, transitional, or liminal state between death and rebirth. The concept arose soon after Gautama Buddha's death, with a number of earlier Buddhist schools accepting the existence of such an intermediate state, while other schools rejected it. That is to say that during the so-called third Council in Pataliputra (Patna) the Asokan section of early Buddhism rejected this concept of àntāra-bháva. Some of those monks who, during this Council, were disrobed and sent away re-introduced it in Hybrid Sanskrit manuscripts. Franklin D. Edgerton mentions àntarābhávika in the Bodhisatttva-bhumi: "someone living in the intermediate state", and àntarābháva in the Làlita-vistára and Abhidhárma-kosa.

The concept of antarābhava was brought into Buddhism from the Vedic-Upanishadic (later Hindu) philosophical tradition. Later Buddhism expanded the bardo concept to six or more states of consciousness covering every stage of life and death. In Tibetan Buddhism, bardo is the central theme of the Bardo Thodol (literally Liberation Through Hearing During the Intermediate State), the Tibetan Book of the Dead, a text intended to both guide the recently deceased person through the death bardo to gain a better rebirth and also to help their loved ones with the grieving process.

Used without qualification, "bardo" is the state of existence intermediate between two lives on earth. According to Tibetan tradition, after death and before one's next birth, when one's consciousness is not connected with a physical body, one experiences a variety of phenomena. These usually follow a particular sequence of degeneration from, just after death, the clearest experiences of reality of which one is spiritually capable, and then proceeding to terrifying hallucinations that arise from the impulses of one's previous unskillful actions. For the prepared and appropriately trained individuals, the bardo offers a state of great opportunity for liberation, since transcendental insight may arise with the direct experience of reality; for others, it can become a place of danger as the karmically created hallucinations can impel one into a less than desirable rebirth.

Metaphorically, bardo can be used to describe times when the usual way of life becomes suspended, as, for example, during a period of illness or during a meditation retreat. Such times can prove fruitful for spiritual progress because external constraints diminish. However, they can also present challenges because our less skillful impulses may come to the foreground, just as in the sidpa bardo.

== Intermediate state in Indian Buddhism ==
From the records of early Buddhist schools, it appears that at least six different groups accepted the notion of an intermediate existence (antarabhāva), namely, the Sarvāstivāda, Darṣṭāntika, Vātsīputrīyas, Saṃmitīya, Pūrvaśaila and late Mahīśāsaka. The first four of these are closely related schools. Opposing them were the Mahāsāṃghika, early Mahīśāsaka, Theravāda, Vibhajyavāda and the Śāriputrābhidharma (possibly Dharmagupta).

Some of the earliest references to an "intermediate existence" are to be found in the Sarvāstivādin text the Mahāvibhāṣa (阿毘達磨大毘婆沙論). For instance, the Mahāvibhāṣa indicates a "basic existence" (本有), an "intermediate existence" (中有), a "birth existence" (生有) and a "death existence" (死有). André Bareau's Les sectes bouddhiques du Petit Véhicule provides the arguments of the Sarvāstivāda schools as follows:

The intermediate being who makes the passage in this way from one existence to the next is formed, like every living being, of the five aggregates (skandha). His existence is demonstrated by the fact that it cannot have any discontinuity in time and space between the place and moment of death and those of rebirth, and therefore it must be that the two existences belonging to the same series are linked in time and space by an intermediate stage. The intermediate being is the Gandharva, the presence of which is as necessary at conception as the fecundity and union of the parents. Furthermore, the Antarāparinirvāyin is an Anāgamin who obtains parinirvāṇa during the intermediary existence. As for the heinous criminal guilty of one of the five crimes without interval (ānantarya), he passes in quite the same way by an intermediate existence at the end of which he is reborn necessarily in hell.

Deriving from a later period of the same school, though with some differences, Vasubandhu's Abhidharmakośa explains:

What is an intermediate being, and an intermediate existence? Intermediate existence, which inserts itself between existence at death and existence at birth, not having arrived at the location where it should go, cannot be said to be born. Between death—that is, the five skandhas of the moment of death—and arising—that is, the five skandhas of the moment of rebirth—there is found an existence—a "body" of five skandhas—that goes to the place of rebirth. This existence between two realms of rebirth (gatī) is called intermediate existence.

He cites a number of texts and examples to defend the notion against other schools which reject it and claim that death in one life is immediately followed by rebirth in the next, without any intermediate state in between the two. Both the Mahāvibhāṣa and the Abhidharmakośa have the notion of the intermediate state lasting "seven times seven days" (i.e. 49 days) at most. This is one view, though, and there were also others.

Similar arguments were also used in Harivarman's *Satyasiddhi Śāstra, and the Upadeśa commentary on the Prajñāpāramitā Sūtras, both of which have strong influence from the Sarvāstivāda school. Both of these texts had powerful influence in Chinese Buddhism, which also accepts this idea as a rule.

The Saddharma-smṛty-upasthāna Sūtra (正法念處經) classifies 17 intermediate states with different experiences.

== Six bardos in Tibetan Buddhism ==
Fremantle states that there are six traditional bardo states known as the Six Bardos: the Bardo of This Life; the Bardo of Meditation; the Bardo of Dream; the Bardo of Dying; the Bardo of Dharmata; and the Bardo of Existence.

Shugchang et al. discuss the Zhitro (Tibetan: Zhi-khro) cycle of teachings of Karma Lingpa which includes the Bardo Thodol and list the Six Bardo: "The first bardo begins when we take birth and endures as long as we live. The second is the bardo of dreams. The third is the bardo of concentration or meditation. The fourth occurs at the moment of death. The fifth is known as the bardo of the luminosity of the true nature. The sixth is called the bardo of transmigration or karmic becoming.

Table of Bardo Stages
Bardo	Bardo Name	Description
During life
1	Bardo of Birth and Life Kyenay bardo (སྐྱེ་གནས་བར་དོ་ skye gnas bar do)	This bardo is the state of waking life. It lasts from one's conception until one's death. This stage encompasses all of the conscious experiences of daily life.
2	Bardo of Dreaming Milam bardo (རྨི་ལམ་བར་དོ་ rmi lam bar do)	This bardo is a subset of the first Bardo. One is in this bardo when they are asleep dreaming. This stage is an opportunity to practice dream yoga. This can help to integrate the dream state into Buddhist sadhana.
3	Bardo of Meditation Samten bardo (བསམ་གཏན་བར་དོ་ bsam gtan bar do)	Like the second bardo, the third bardo is also a subset of the first bardo. It is stage experienced in deep meditation, usually only by advanced meditators, though individuals may have spontaneous experience of it.
During dying
4	Bardo of the Moment of Death Chikhai bardo (འཆི་ཁའི་བར་དོ}་ chi kha'i bar do)	The fourth bardo begins when the dying process begins, specifically when the outer and inner signs presage that the onset of death is high. The bardo continues through the dissolution or transmutation of the elements until the external and internal breath has completed. This element dissolution leads to the state of consciousness known as the clear light of death. Those who were experienced at voluntarily sustaining the clear light consciousness during life are capable of retaining lucid awareness throughout the clear light, while others lose lucid awareness, blacking out. Meditation practitioners train to retain lucidity during the clear light of death, by practicing sustaining lucidity during the clear of light of sleep state, accessed via lucid deep sleep. The recognition of the clear light of death leads to the state of Tukdam.
5	Bardo of Reality or Luminosity Chönyi bardo (ཆོས་ཉིད་བར་དོ་ chos nyid bar do)	The fifth bardo begins after the final 'inner breath' (Sanskrit: prana, vayu; Tibetan: rlung). Within this Bardo, visions and auditory phenomena occur, known in Dzogchen teachings as the spontaneously manifesting Tögal (Tibetan: thod-rgal) visions. Concomitant to these visions, there is a welling of profound peace and pristine awareness. Those who have not practiced during their lived experience and/or who do not recognize the clear light (Tibetan: 'od gsal) at the moment of death are usually deluded throughout the fifth bardo of luminosity.
6	Bardo of Becoming or Rebirth Sidpa bardo (སྲིད་པ་བར་དོ་ srid pa bar do)	The sixth bardo is when the consciousness takes on a mental body. This stage endures until the inner-breath commences in the new transmigrating form determined by the "karmic seeds" within the storehouse consciousness.

=== History ===
Since the Bardo Thodol was translated into English, different conceptions of the bardo have emerged over the years. In the translation of Walter Y. Evans-Wentz in 1927, the description of the bardo was an "esoteric" view of rebirth as an evolutionary system in which regression to the brutish realms was impossible. Almost four decades later, in 1964, Timothy Leary, Ralph Metzner and Richard Alpert saw the intermediate states as being really about life, profitable as an account of an eight-hour acid trip. Chögyam Trungpa portrays the realms of rebirth as psychological states in 1975, and Sogyal Rinpoche uses his discussion of the six realms as an opportunity to lampoon California surfers and New York bankers, in the translation that was published in 1992. Two years later Robert Thurman interpreted the bardo, which is described originally as a Nyingma text, from a Geluk frame.

Fremantle charts the development of the bardo concept through the Himalayan tradition:

Originally bardo referred only to the period between one life and the next, and this is still its normal meaning when it is mentioned without any qualification. There was considerable dispute over this theory during the early centuries of Buddhism, with one side arguing that rebirth (or conception) follows immediately after death, and the other saying that there must be an interval between the two. With the rise of mahayana, belief in a transitional period prevailed. Later Buddhism expanded the whole concept to distinguish six or more similar states, covering the whole cycle of life, death, and rebirth. But it can also be interpreted as any transitional experience, any state that lies between two other states. Its original meaning, the experience of being between death and rebirth, is the prototype of the bardo experience, while the six traditional bardos show how the essential qualities of that experience are also present in other transitional periods. By refining even further the understanding of the essence of bardo, it can then be applied to every moment of existence. The present moment, the now, is a continual bardo, always suspended between the past and the future.

Yongey Mingur Rinpoche adds another modern view and emphasises on the bardo of becoming: "When we move past the convenience of language and categories, every second manifests the bardo of becoming. Becoming and becoming. All phenomena always just become [...] When we sensitize ourselves to the subtle transitions of emotions, or of bodily change, or shifts in social circumstances, or environmental transformations such as differences in landscape and light, or developments in language, art, or politics-we see that it's all always changing, dying, and becoming."

== Intermediate state in Theravāda ==
Theravāda Abhidhamma texts like the Kathavatthu traditionally reject the view that there is an intermediate or transitional state (antarabhāva) between rebirths; they hold that rebirth happens instantaneously (in one mind moment) through the re-linking consciousness (patisandhi citta).

However, as has been noted by various modern scholars like Bhikkhu Sujato, there are passages in the Theravāda Pali Canon which support the idea of an intermediate state, the most explicit of which is the Kutuhalasāla Sutta.

This sutta states:

[The Buddha:] "Vaccha, I declare that there is rebirth for one with fuel [with grasping], not for one without fuel. Vaccha, just as fire burns with fuel, not without fuel, even so, Vaccha, I declare that there is rebirth for one with fuel [with grasping], not for one without fuel."

[Vaccha replies:] "But, master Gotama, when a flame is tossed by the wind and goes a long way, what does master Gotama declare to be its fuel?"

[Buddha:] "Vaccha, when a flame is tossed by the wind and goes a long way, I declare that it is fueled by the air. For, Vaccha, at that time, the air is the fuel."

[Vaccha:] "Master Gotama, when a being has laid down this body, but has not yet been reborn in another body, what does the master Gotama declare to be the fuel?"

[Buddha:] "Vaccha, when a being has laid down this body, but has not yet been reborn in another body, it is fuelled by craving, I say. For, Vaccha, at that time, craving is the fuel."

Furthermore, some Theravāda scholars (such as Balangoda Ananda Maitreya) have defended the idea of an intermediate state, and it is also a very common belief among some monks and laypersons in the Theravāda world (where it is commonly referred to as the gandhabba or antarabhāva). According to Sujato, it is also widely accepted among Thai forest tradition teachers.

== In East Asian Buddhism ==
East Asian Buddhism generally accepts the main doctrines of the Yogacara tradition as taught by Vasubandhu and Asanga. This includes the acceptance of the intermediate existence (中有, zhōng yǒu, Japanese: chūu). The doctrine of the intermediate existence is mentioned in various Chinese Buddhist scholastic works, such as Xuanzang's Cheng Weishi Lun (Discourse on the Perfection of Consciousness-only). The Chinese Buddhist Canon contains a text called the Antarabhava sutra, which is used in funerary rituals.

The founder of Soto Zen, Dogen, wrote the following regarding how to navigate the intermediate state:

"When you leave this life, and before you enter the next life, there is a place called an intermediary realm. You stay there for seven days. You should resolve to keep chanting the names of the three treasures without ceasing while you are there. After seven days you die in the intermediary realm and remain there for no more than seven days. At this time you can see and hear without hindrance, like having a celestial eye. Resolve to encourage yourself to keep chanting the names of the three treasures without ceasing: 'I take refuge in the Buddha. I take refuge in the Dharma. I take refuge in the Sangha.' After passing through the intermediary realm, when you approach your parents to be conceived, resolve to maintain authentic wisdom. Keep chanting refuge in the three treasures in your mother's womb. Do not neglect chanting while you are given birth. Resolve deeply to dedicate yourself to chant and take refuge in the three treasures through the six sense roots. When your life ends, your eye sight will suddenly become dark. Know that this is the end of your life and be determined to chant, 'I take refuge in the buddha.' Then, all buddhas in the ten directions will show compassion to you. Even if due to conditions you are bound to an unwholesome realm, you will be able to be born in the deva realm or in the presence of the Buddha. Bow and listen to the Buddha." — Shobogenzo, section 94, "Mind of the Way", translated by Peter Levitt & Kazuaki Tanahashi (2013):

== See also ==
- Aether
- Bardo, False Chronicle of a Handful of Truths, Mexican film
- Bardo Thodol
- Barzakh, a somewhat related concept in Islam
- Chikhai Bardo, 7th episode of Season 2 of the American television series Severance
- Desire realm
- Dzogchen
- Intermediate state, a somewhat related concept in Christianity
- Limbo
- Liminality
- Lucid dreaming
- Lincoln in the Bardo, a 2017 novel by George Saunders.
- Matarta in Mandaeism
- Sanzu River
- Six Yogas of Naropa
- Tukdam
- Zhitro
