= Rajnikant Shroff =

Businessperson from India

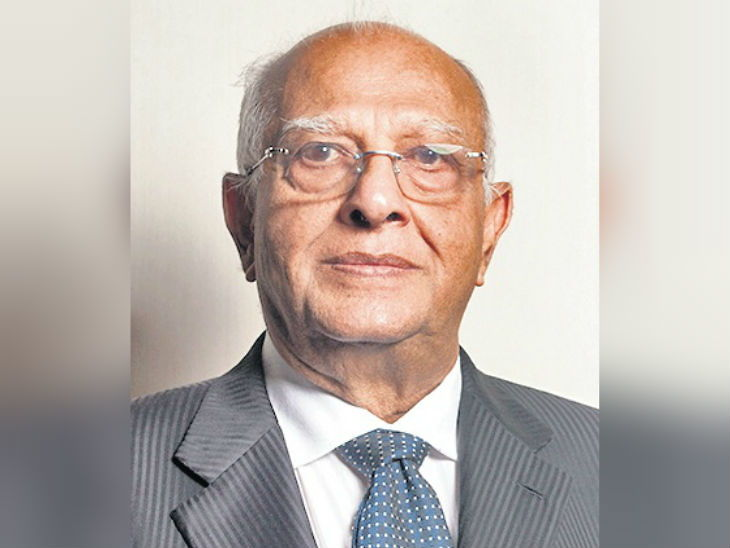
- Born: Rajnikant Devidas Shroff; Vapi, Gujarat, India
- Citizenship: India
- Education: Guru Nanak Khalsa College, Bombay University
- Occupations: Businessperson, Founder & Chairman of UPL
- Organization: UPL Limited
- Known for: Pioneering Red phosphorus manufacturing in India
- Awards: Padma Bhushan, 2021; Order of the Aztec Eagle, 2018

Rajnikant Devidas Shroff, also known as Rajju Shroff, is an Indian businessperson and billionaire, who is the founder and chairman of UPL Limited. In 2020, he was ranked as the #93 richest person in India, with a net worth of $1.5 billion, according to Forbes. The Government of India conferred him India's third highest civilian award the Padma Bhushan in 2021.

== Early life ==
He was born in Kutch, Gujarat. He pioneered Red phosphorus manufacturing in India by setting up UPL Limited in Mumbai in 1969. He is Chemistry graduate from the Bombay University. He has been listed in the Forbes India's Tycoons of Tomorrow 2018.

In September 2018, Shroff received the Orden Mexicana del Águila Azteca (Mexican Order of the Aztec Eagle), the highest Mexican order awarded by the Mexican government to foreigners in recognition of outstanding services to Mexico or to humanity.

== Awards and recognition ==
- Padma Bhushan, by the Government of India, 2021
- Forbes India's Tycoons of Tomorrow 2018
- Ernst & Young Entrepreneur of the Year Award, 2013
- Orden Mexicana del Águila Azteca by the Federal government of Mexico, 2018
- Lifetime Achievement Award by the Indian Chemical Council, 2010

== See also ==
- List of Padma Bhushan award recipients (2020–2029)
