= Longhua Subdistrict, Shenzhen =

Subdistrict of Shenzhen, China

Coordinates: 22.6601952°N 114.043107°E

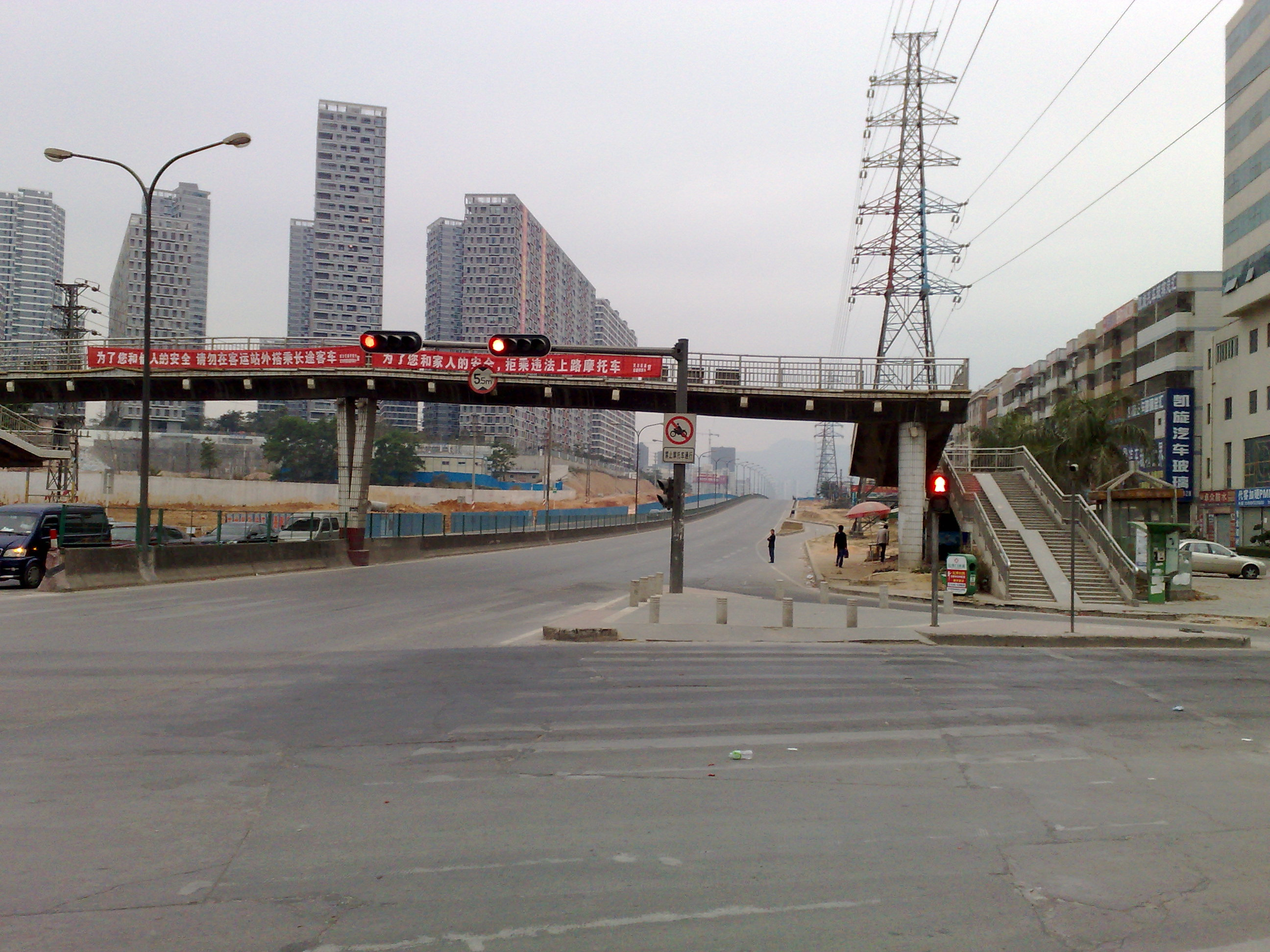
Longhua Subdistrict

Longhua Subdistrict (simplified Chinese: 龙华街道; traditional Chinese: 龍華街道; pinyin: Lónghuá Jiēdào; Jyutping: lung4 waa4 gaai1 dou6) is a subdistrict in Longhua District, Shenzhen, Guangdong Province, China. Before 30 December 2011, it was part of Bao'an District.

== Industry ==
Foxconn Technology Group, the world's largest electronics contract manufacturer has its largest factory precinct at Longhua Science and Technology Park in Longhua, employing hundreds of thousands of workers in 15 factories.

Huawei's headquarter campus is also located in Longhua, adjacent to Foxconn's campus.

== Transportation ==
The area is served by Line 4 of Shenzhen Metro.
