= Kailash Nath Dikshit =

Indian archaeologist (born 1936)

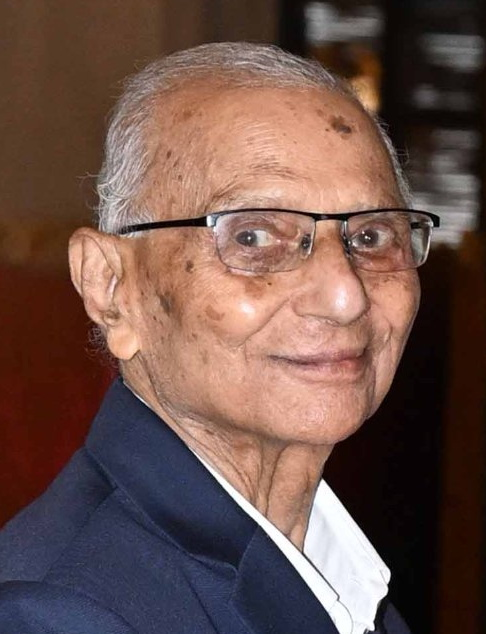
- Dikshit in 2025
- Born: 1936 (age 89–90); Lucknow, Uttar Pradesh, India
- Education: University of Lucknow
- Occupation: Archaeologist
- Years active: 1957–1994
- Organization: Archaeological Survey of India
- Known for: Contributions to Indian archaeology and civilization studies
- Awards: Padma Bhushan (2025); Dr. Vishnu Sridhar Wakankar Rashtriya Samman (2010–11)

Kailash Nath Dikshit (born 1936), also known as K. N. Dikshit, is an Indian archaeologist known for his contributions to the study of Indian civilization and for directing several major archaeological expeditions. He served as the Director of the Archaeological Survey of India (ASI). In 2025, he was honored with the Padma Bhushan, India's third-highest civilian award, by the Government of India, for his contributions to the field of archaeology.

== Biography ==
Kailash Nath Dikshit was born in 1936 in Lucknow, Uttar Pradesh. He completed his schooling at Queens Anglo Sanskrit Inter College, Lucknow, passing his high school and intermediate exams in 1952. He earned a Master's degree in Ancient Indian History and Archaeology from the University of Lucknow in 1956, and later received a Postgraduate diploma in Archaeology from the Government of India in 1962.

Dikshit joined the Archaeological Survey of India in 1957 as an Exploration Assistant. During his distinguished career, he also served briefly as Deputy Keeper (Pre-history) at the National Museum of India, New Delhi. Within ASI, he held several important positions, including Superintending Archaeologist in various regional circles. He retired in 1994 as the Joint Director General of the ASI.

== Awards and recognition ==
- Padma Bhushan (2025) - Awarded by the Government of India for distinguished service in archaeology.
- Dr. Vishnu Sridhar Wakankar Rashtriya Samman (2010–11) - Conferred by the Government of Madhya Pradesh.
- Outstanding Archaeologist Award (2017) - Given by the Central Government Museum, Allahabad.
- Lifetime Achievement Award (2015) - Presented by the Museums Association of India, Chennai.
