= Foxconn =

Taiwanese multinational electronics contract manufacturer

Hon Hai Precision Industry Co., Ltd.
- Logo
- Trade name: Hon Hai Technology Group (鴻海科技集團); Foxconn Technology Group (富士康科技集团); Foxconn
- Native name: 鴻海精密工業股份有限公司
- Romanized name: Hónghǎi Jīngmì Gōngyè Gǔfèn Yǒuxiàn Gōngsī
- Formerly: Hon Hai Plastics Corporation (鴻海塑料企業有限公司) (1974–1982)
- Type: Public
- Traded as: TWSE: 2317; LSE: HHPDS&P Asia 50 component
- ISIN: TW0002317005
- Industry: Electronics; Electronics manufacturing services
- Founded: 20 February 1974; 52 years ago (as Hon Hai Precision Industry Co., Ltd.)
- Founder: Terry Gou
- Headquarters: Tucheng District, New Taipei City, Taiwan
- Area served: Worldwide
- Key people: Young Liu (chairman and president)
- Products: Electronic components; Connectors and cable assemblies; Printed circuit boards (PCBs); Computer hardware; Consumer electronics; Electric vehicles
- Services: Contract electronics manufacturing; Original design manufacturing (ODM); System integration
- Revenue: ▲NT$8.1 trillion (2025) (US$259.99 billion)
- Operating income: ▲NT$259.22 billion (2025) (US$8.32 billion)
- Net income: ▲NT$189.4 billion (2025) (US$6.08 billion)
- Total assets: ▲NT$5.1 trillion (2025) (US$163.78 billion)
- Total equity: ▲NT$1.97 trillion (2025) (US$63.23 billion)
- Number of employees: ▲826,608 (2025)
- Subsidiaries: Foxconn Industrial Internet; Foxtron; FIT Foxconn Interconnect Technology; FIH Mobile; Healthconn; CircuTech; Sharp Corporation (66%); Zhen Ding Technology; Foxconn Technology Co., Ltd.; Foxsemicon Integrated Technology Inc.; GIS; Pan-International; Eson Precision Ind. Co., Ltd.; Zhong Yang; Maxnerva Technology Services Co., Ltd.; Smart Technologies; Belkin; Linksys
- Website: honhai.com

Hon Hai Precision Industry Co., Ltd.
- Traditional Chinese: 鴻海精密工業股份有限公司
- Simplified Chinese: 鸿海精密工业股份有限公司
Transcriptions
Standard Mandarin
- Hanyu Pinyin: Hónghǎi Jīngmì Gōngyè Gǔfèn Yǒuxiàn Gōngsī
- Wade–Giles: Hung-hai Ching-mi Kung-yeh Ku-fen Yu-hsien-kung-ssŭ
Yue: Cantonese
- Jyutping: hung4 hoi2 zing1 mai6 gung1 jip6 gu2 fan6 jau5 haan6 gung1 si1
Southern Min
- Tâi-lô: Hông-hái Ching-bi̍t Kong-gi̍p Kú-hūn Iú-hān Kong-si

Hon Hai Technology Group
- Traditional Chinese: 鴻海科技集團
- Simplified Chinese: 鸿海科技集团
Transcriptions
Standard Mandarin
- Hanyu Pinyin: Hónghǎi Kējì Jítuán
- Wade–Giles: Hung-hai Kʻo-chi Chi-tʻuan

Foxconn Technology Group
- Traditional Chinese: 富士康科技集團
- Simplified Chinese: 富士康科技集团
Transcriptions
Standard Mandarin
- Hanyu Pinyin: Fùshìkāng Kējì Jítuán
- Wade–Giles: Fu-shih-kʻang Kʻo-chi Chi-tʻuan

Foxconn logos used for each region

The logo used in Taiwan

The logo used in China

The logo used outside of Taiwan and China

Hon Hai Precision Industry Co., Ltd. (鴻海精密工業股份有限公司), (doing business as Hon Hai Technology Group (鴻海科技集團) in Taiwan, Foxconn Technology Group (富士康科技集团) in China, and Foxconn (富士康) internationally) is a Taiwanese multinational electronics contract manufacturer established in 1974 with headquarters in Tucheng District, New Taipei City, Taiwan. In 2023, the company's annual revenue reached 6.16 trillion New Taiwan dollars (equivalent to US$198.533 billion in 2024) and was ranked 20th in the 2023 Fortune Global 500. It is the world's largest contract manufacturer of electronics. While headquartered in Taiwan, the company earns the majority of its revenue from assets in China and is one of the largest employers worldwide. Terry Gou is the company founder and former chairman.

Foxconn manufactures electronic products for major American, Canadian, Chinese, Finnish, and Japanese companies. Notable products manufactured by Foxconn include the BlackBerry, iPad, iPhone, iPod, Kindle, all Nintendo gaming systems since the GameCube, Nintendo DS models, Sega models, Nokia devices, Cisco products, Sony devices (including most all PlayStation gaming consoles), Google Pixel devices, Xiaomi devices, every successor to Microsoft's Xbox console, and several CPU sockets, including the TR4 CPU socket on some motherboards. As of 2012, Foxconn factories manufactured an estimated 40% of all consumer electronics sold worldwide.

Foxconn named Young Liu its new chairman after the retirement of founder Terry Gou, effective on 1 July 2019. Young Liu was the special assistant to former chairman Terry Gou and the head of business group S (semiconductor). Analysts said the handover signaled the company's future direction and underscored the importance of semiconductors, together with technologies like artificial intelligence, robotics, and autonomous driving. That was in the context of the maturation of Foxconn's traditional major business of smartphone assembly.

Foxconn's Q2 '24 revenue was NT$1.551 trillion (US$31.17 billion). Circuits Assembly magazine named Foxconn the largest electronics manufacturing services company in the world for the 14th straight year.

== History ==
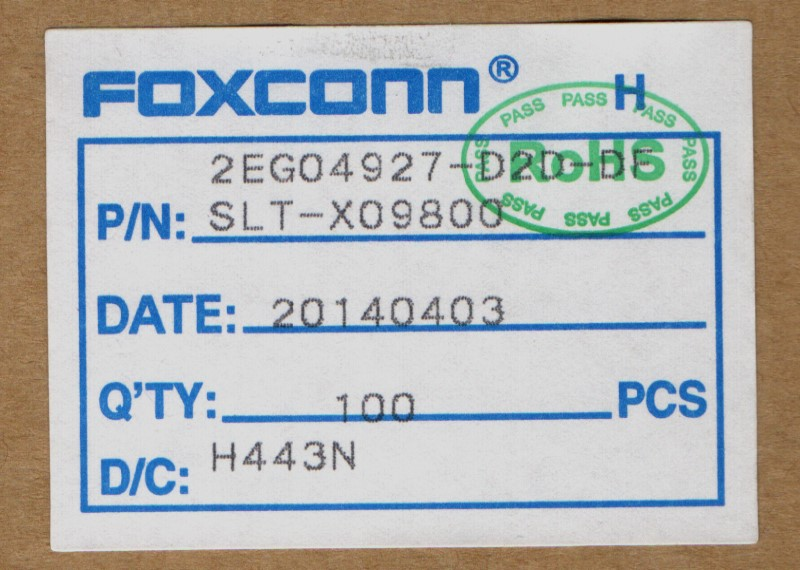
Foxconn connector box tag in 2014

Terry Gou established Hon Hai Precision Industry Co., Ltd. as an electrical components manufacturer in 1974 in Taipei, Taiwan. Foxconn's first manufacturing plant in China opened in Longhua Town, Shenzhen, in 1988.

One of the important milestones for Foxconn occurred in 2001, when Intel selected Foxconn to manufacture its Intel-branded motherboards instead of Asus. By November 2007, Foxconn further expanded with an announced plan to build a new US$500 million plant factory in Huizhou, Southern China.

In January 2012, Foxconn named Tien Chong (Terry) Cheng chief executive of its subsidiary FIH Mobile Limited. At this time, Foxconn made up approximately 40% of worldwide consumer electronics production.

Expansion was further pursued after a March 2012 acquisition of a 10-percent stake in the Japanese electronics company Sharp Corporation for US$806 million and to purchase up to 50 percent of the LCDs produced at Sharp's plant in Sakai, Japan. However, the agreed deal was broken as Sharp's shares continued to plunge in the following months. In September 2012, Foxconn announced plans to invest US$494 million in the construction of five new factories in Itu, Brazil, creating 10,000 jobs.

In 2014, the company purchased Asia Pacific Telecom and won some spectrum licenses at an auction, which allowed it to operate 4G telecommunications equipment in Taiwan.

On 25 February 2016, Sharp accepted a ¥700 billion (US$6.24 billion) takeover bid from Foxconn to acquire over 66 percent of Sharp's voting stock. However, Sharp had undisclosed liabilities which were later informed by Sharp's legal representative to Foxconn. The deal was halted by Foxconn's board of directors. Foxconn asked to call off the deal, but it was proceeded by the former Sharp president. Terry Gou, in the meeting, then wrote the word "義", which means "righteousness", on the whiteboard, saying that Foxconn should honor the deal. A month later, on 30 March 2016, the deal was announced as finalized in a joint press statement, but at a lower price.

In 2016, Foxconn, together with Tencent and luxury-car dealer Harmony New Energy Auto, founded Future Mobility, a car start up that aimed to sell all-electric fully autonomous premium cars by 2020. A Foxconn unit, Foxconn Interconnect Technology, acquired Belkin International for $866m on 26 March 2018.

In July 2019, Foxconn appointed Liu, Young-Way as the new chairman of the group.

On 5 February 2020, Foxconn started producing medical masks and clothing at its Shenzhen factory in China during the Chinese New Year and the height of the COVID-19 pandemic. The company initially said the masks it makes would be for internal employee use. The outbreak of coronavirus disease 2019 led to a worldwide spike in demand for masks, resulting in global shortages.

Following almost a year of public controversy regarding its COVID-19 vaccine shortage; in June 2021, Taiwan agreed to allow founder Terry Gou, through his Yongling Foundation charity, to join with contract chip maker TSMC, and negotiate purchasing COVID-19 vaccines on its behalf. In July 2021, BioNTech's Chinese sales agent Fosun Pharma announced that Foxconn and TSMC had reached an agreement to purchase 10 million BioNTech COVID-19 vaccines from Germany for Taiwan. The two technology manufacturers pledged to each buy five million doses for up to $175 million, for donation to Taiwan's vaccination program.

In 2024, Foxconn surpassed expectations with record fourth-quarter revenue.

== International operations ==
Foxconn has 137 campuses and offices in 24 countries and areas around the globe. The majority of Foxconn's factories are located in East Asia, with others in Brazil, India, Europe, and Mexico.

=== China ===
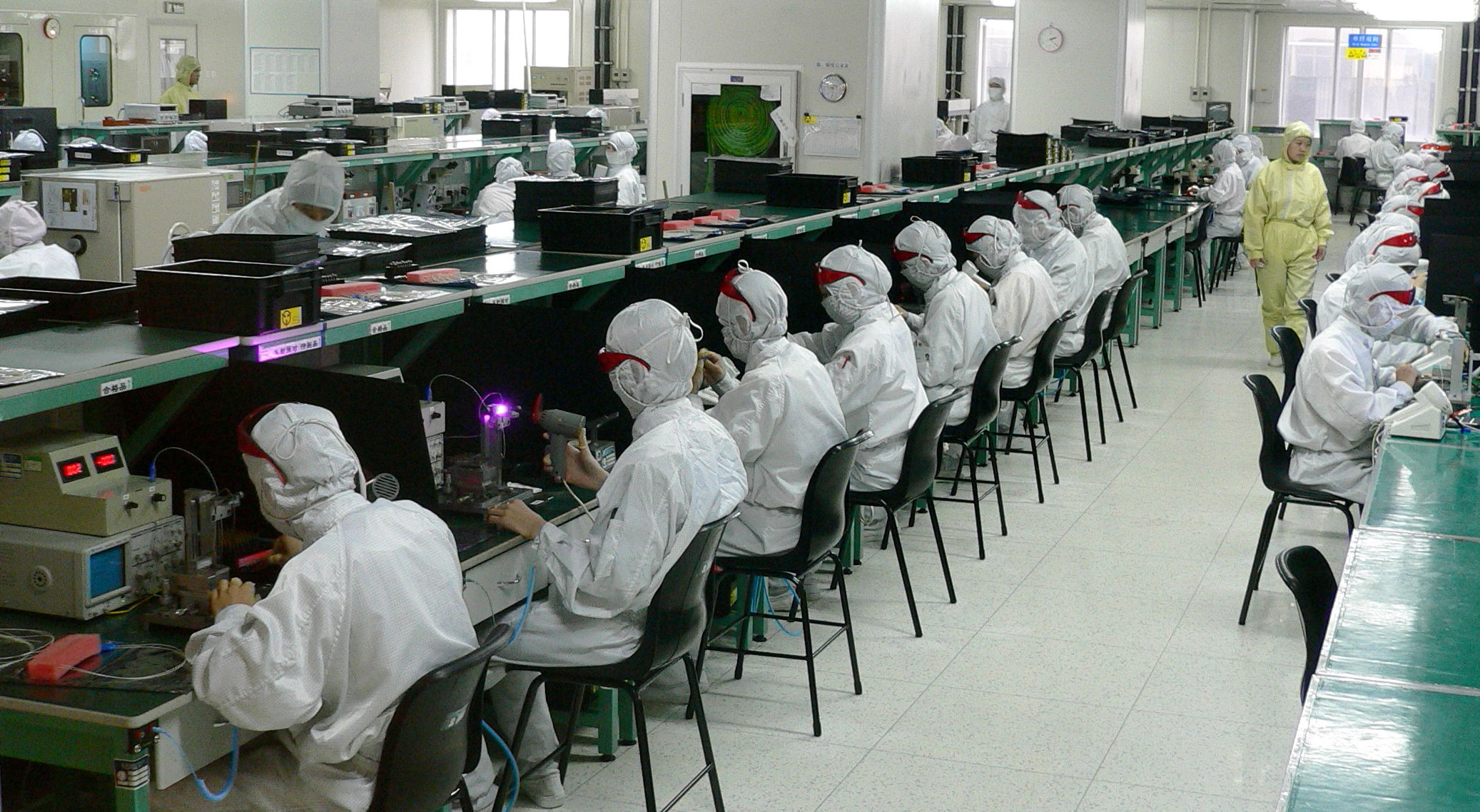
One of the production floors in Foxconn factory at Shenzhen

As of 2012, Foxconn had 12 factories in nine Chinese cities—more than in any other country.

The largest Foxconn factory is located in Longhua Subdistrict, Shenzhen, where hundreds of thousands of workers (varying counts include 230,000, 300,000, and 450,000) are employed at the Longhua Science & Technology Park, a walled campus sometimes referred to as "Foxconn City".

Covering about 3 km^{2} (1.2 sq mi), the park includes 15 factories, worker dormitories, four swimming pools, fire brigade, own television network (Foxconn TV), city centre with grocery store, bank, restaurants, book store, hospital. While some workers live in surrounding towns and villages, others live and work inside the complex; a quarter of the employees live in the dormitories.

Another Foxconn factory "city" is located at Zhengzhou Technology Park in Zhengzhou, Henan province, where a reported 120,000 workers were employed as of 2012, later, 200,000 workers were employed as of November 2022. The park produces the bulk of Apple's iPhone line and is sometimes referred to as "iPhone City". Foxconn manufactures iPhones through a division named the integrated Digital Product Business Group (iDPBG).

==== Events ====
Foxconn's planned future expansion includes sites at Wuhan in Hubei province, Kunshan in Jiangsu province, Tianjin, Beijing, Huizhou and Guangzhou in Guangdong province, China. A Foxconn branch that primarily manufactures Apple products is Hongfujin.

On 25 May 2016, the BBC reported that Foxconn replaced 60,000 employees because it had automated "many of the manufacturing tasks associated with their operations". The organization later confirmed those claims.

In September 2017, Foxconn agreed with the Nanjing government to invest US$5.7 billion for the development of intelligent terminal devices, LCD development, and other research.

On 21 October 2022, and in response to a Covid outbreak at Zhengzhou Technology Park, Foxconn imposed restrictions on its iPhone assembly plant, with dine-in meal facilities closed. On 31 October 2022, after policies intended to control a Covid outbreak prevented workers from leaving the complex, many workers jumped the fence in order to escape. On 2 November 2022, the government imposed the lockdown to the Zhengzhou Airport Economy Zone, where the Foxconn factory is situated. On 23 November, workers clashed with law enforcement over the harsh COVID restrictions and claims that Foxconn failed to provide the salary packages that were promised to new hires. Videos circulated on Chinese social media depicting law enforcement beating protesting workers as well as large crowds of workers fighting back law enforcement.

=== Brazil ===
All company facilities in South America are located in Brazil, and these include mobile phone factories in Manaus and Indaiatuba as well as production bases in Jundiaí, Sorocaba, and Santa Rita do Sapucaí. The company is considering further investments in Brazil.

=== Europe ===
Foxconn has manufacturing facilities in the Czech Republic, Hungary and Slovakia.

In the Czech Republic, its factories in Pardubice and Kutná Hora employ around 4,500 people. They produce computers, networking equipment, servers and other electronics. The Kutná Hora plant also manufactures liquid-cooled supercomputers for Hewlett Packard Enterprise. Foxconn was the country's second-largest exporter in 2024, with exports worth CZK 166 billion. In 2026, the company announced plans to manufacture AI computing systems in Pardubice in partnership with Bull.

In Hungary, the Komárom factory produces servers, networking equipment and data-centre hardware. It employs more than 2,600 people and has expanded production to meet growing demand for AI servers.

In Slovakia, Foxconn acquired a majority stake in a former Sony television factory in Nitra in 2010. The plant has manufactured televisions and printed circuit boards, but has undergone restructuring in recent years.

=== India ===
As of early 2015, Foxconn had tied up with Sony for manufacturing their televisions and selling it all over India. Hence, they started a new plant called Competition Team Technology (India) Private Limited in Irungattukottai (near Poonamallee, Chennai) which was later moved to Oragadam (Kanchipuram) in 2019. As of mid-2015, Foxconn was in talks to manufacture Apple's iPhone in India. In 2015, Foxconn announced that it would be setting up twelve factories in India and would create around one million jobs. It also discussed its intent to work with the Adani Group for expansion in the country. In August 2015, Foxconn invested in Snapdeal. In September 2016, Foxconn started manufacturing products with Gionee. In 2017, Foxconn started the production of iPhones in Sriperumbudur, near Chennai. In April 2019, Foxconn reported that they are ready to mass-produce newer iPhones in India. Its Chairman, Terry Gou, said that the manufacturing will take place in the southern city of Chennai.

In September 2022, Foxconn signed a deal for a semiconductor plant in Gujarat with an investment of $21 billion, by Vedanta Group. In July 2023, Foxconn made a decision to quit the project, citing a number of issues with Vedanta Group as well as including external ones. In August 2023, during its annual meeting, Foxconn reportedly stated that India at present accounts for more than 5% of the company's business and there is ample space for future investments. Foxconn has set a target to employ 2 million jobs and meet India's target of exporting mobile phones worth $10 billion, both by 2030. To meet these targets, as of September 2023, the company has three manufacturing plants under construction, all in southern India–a component and semiconductor plant near the company's existing plant in Chennai, and two plants each in Bangalore (near its airport) and Hyderabad (Kongara Kalan) for making iPhones, iPads, iPods and AirPods. All three plants are projected to be completed and begin operations by the end of 2024. They will together employ around 400,000 people in the first five years of their operations.

In November 2023, Foxconn announced a $1.54 billion investment in India to "help it fulfil 'operational needs.'" In August 2024, Foxconn showed interest in investing in Hyderabad, as confirmed by the Telangana government. Chairman Young Liu met with Chief Minister A Revanth Reddy, discussing plans for a new "fourth city" near Hyderabad.

=== Japan ===
Foxconn and Sharp Corporation jointly operate two manufacturing plants specializing in large-screen televisions in Sakai, Osaka. In August 2012, it was reported that Sharp, while doing corporate restructuring and downsizing, was considering selling the plants to Foxconn. The company was believed to be receptive to the plan. The acquisition was completed with a $3.8 billion deal in August 2016.

=== Malaysia ===
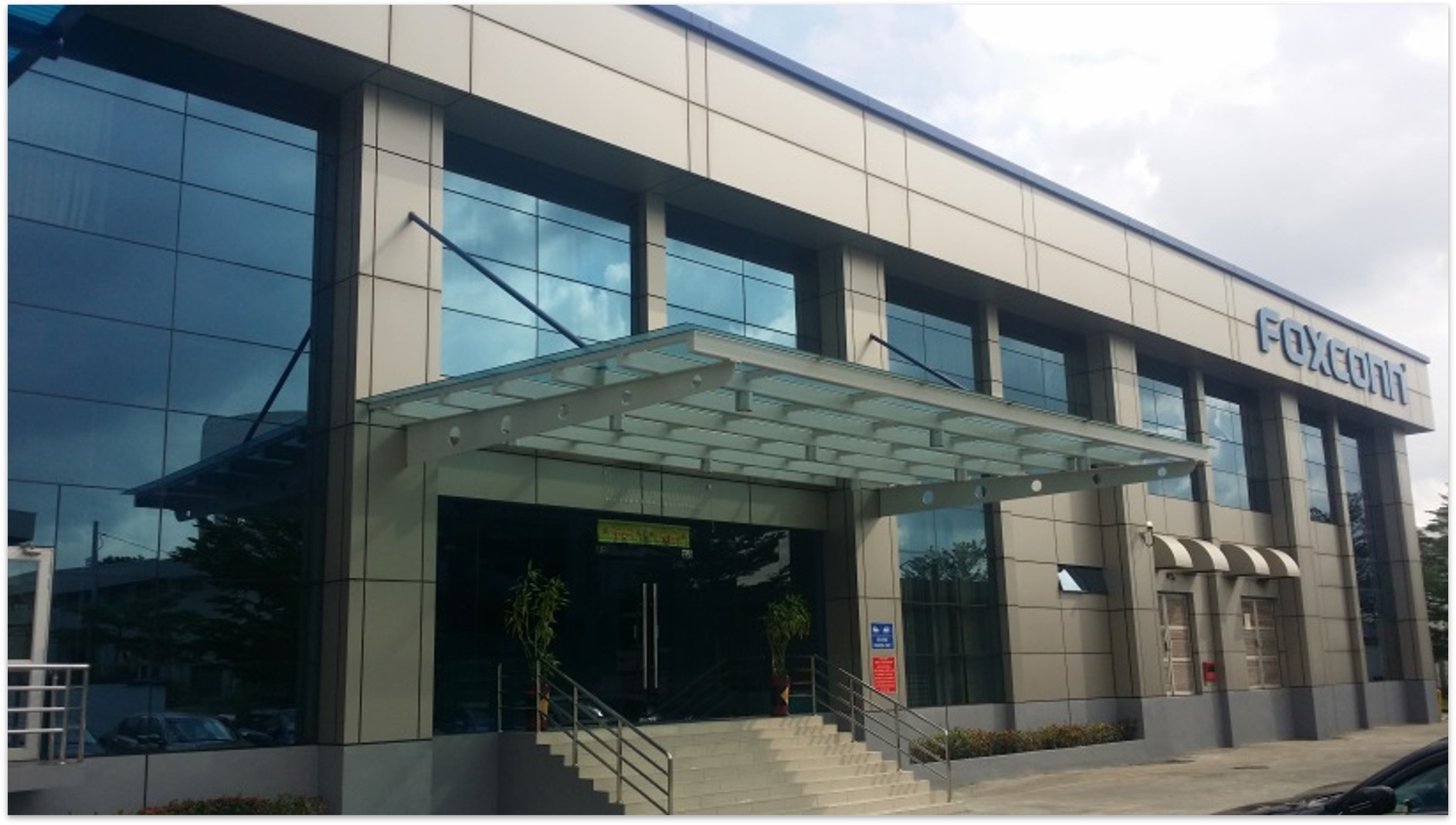
Foxconn Technology Malaysia factory at Kulai, Malaysia

As of 2011, Foxconn had at least seven factories in the Johor state, at Kulai, where it is developing an industrial park that includes four factories that comprise fully automated assembly lines as well as fully automated packaging lines.

=== Mexico ===
Foxconn has a facility in San Jerónimo, Chihuahua that assembles computers, and two facilities in Juárez – a former Motorola production base that manufactures mobile phones, and a set-top box factory acquired from Cisco Systems. LCD televisions are also made in the country in Tijuana at a plant acquired from Sony.

On 2 June 2022, Foxconn announced that their Mexico-based production plant had been hit by a ransomware attack in late May, disrupting production. The facility affected was located in Tijuana, Baja California and specializes in the production of consumer electronics, medical devices, and industrial products.

=== South Korea ===
The company invested $377 million in June 2014 to pick up a 4.9 percent shareholding in a South Korean IT services provider, SK C&C.

=== United States ===
Foxconn announced on 26 July 2017 that it would build a $10 billion TV manufacturing plant in southeastern Wisconsin and would initially employ 3,000 workers (set to increase to 13,000). As part of the agreement, Foxconn was set to receive subsidies ranging from $3 billion to $4.8 billion (paid in increments if Foxconn met certain targets), which would be by far the largest subsidy ever given to a foreign firm in U.S. history. Some estimate that Foxconn is expected to contribute $51.5 billion to Wisconsin's GDP over the next 15 years, which is $3.4 billion annually. However, numerous economists have also expressed skepticism that the benefits would exceed the costs of the deal. Others have noted that Foxconn has made similar claims about job creation in the past which did not come to fruition. Their office building in Milwaukee is the only one in Wisconsin

Foxconn was also exempted by Governor Scott Walker from filing an environmental impact statement, prompting criticism from environmentalists. The plant was estimated to contribute significantly to air pollution in the region. Environmentalists criticised the decision to allow Foxconn to draw 26,000 cubic metres (7×10^{6} US gal) of water per day from Lake Michigan. Given water concerns, Foxconn is spending $30 million on zero liquid discharge technology. Foxconn is also required to replace wetlands at a higher ratio than other companies; Foxconn must restore 2 acres of wetland for every 1 acre disturbed instead of the ratio of 1.2 to 1 for other companies.

As of 4 October 2017, Foxconn agreed to locate their plant in Mount Pleasant, Wisconsin, and broke ground for the plant 28 June 2018. President Trump was in attendance to promote American manufacturing.

In January 2019, Foxconn said it was reconsidering its initial plans to manufacture LCD screens at the Wisconsin plant, citing high labour costs in the United States. Under a new agreement announced in April 2021, Foxconn will reduce its planned investment to $672 million with 1,454 new jobs. Tax credits available to the project were reduced to $8 million. In October 2021, Lordstown Motors announced a $250 million deal to sell a former GM plant to Foxconn, which would become a contract assembler for the company's Endurance pickup truck. The deal was completed in May 2022 for a final price of $230 million. It was announced Foxconn would also invest $50 million into the company through a purchase of common stock.

== Subsidiaries ==
=== FIH Mobile ===
FIH Mobile is a subsidiary of Foxconn, offering services such as product development and after-sales support. It was incorporated in the tax haven of the Cayman Islands in 2000.

On 18 May 2016, FIH Mobile announced the purchase of Microsoft Mobile's feature phone business. Microsoft Mobile Vietnam is also part of the sale to FIH Mobile, which consists of the Hanoi, Vietnam manufacturing facility. The rest of the business has been sold to a new Finland-based company HMD Global, which started developing and selling new Nokia-branded devices in early 2017. The total sale to both companies amounted to US$350 million. FIH Mobile is now manufacturing new Nokia-branded devices developed by HMD.

=== Foxtron ===
Foxtron (鴻華先進科技) is a joint venture of Foxconn and Yulon Group founded in 2020 for vehicular manufacturing and research and development of electric vehicles.

== Affiliates ==
=== Sharp ===
Sharp Corporation (シャープ株式会社, Shāpu Kabushiki-gaisha) is a Japanese electronics company. It is headquartered in Sakai, Osaka and was founded by Tokuji Hayakawa in 1912 in Honjo, Tokyo and established as the Hayakawa Metal Works Institute in Abeno, Osaka in 1924. Since 2016, it is majority owned by Foxconn.

== Controversies ==
Foxconn has been involved in several controversies relating to employee grievances or treatment. Foxconn has more than one million employees. In China, it employed more people than any other private company as of 2011.

=== Working conditions ===
Allegations of poor working conditions have been made on several occasions. News reports highlight the long working hours, discrimination against mainland Chinese workers by their Taiwanese co-workers, and lack of working relationships at the company. Although Foxconn was found to be compliant in the majority of areas when Apple Inc. audited the maker of its iPods and iPhones in 2007, the audit did substantiate several of the allegations. In May 2010, Shanghaiist reported that security guards had been caught beating factory workers.

In reaction to a spate of negative press, particularly that involving worker suicides in which 14 people died from January to May 2010, Steve Jobs defended Apple's relationship with the company in June 2010, citing that its Chinese partner is "pretty nice" and is "not a sweatshop". Meanwhile, however, a report jointly produced by 20 universities in Hong Kong, Taiwan, and mainland China described Foxconn factories as labour camps with widespread worker abuse and illegal overtime.

Concerns increased in early 2012 by an article published in The New York Times in October 2011. It reported evidence that substantiated some of the criticisms. The 2012 audit commissioned by Apple Inc. and performed by the Fair Labor Association found that workers were routinely subjected to inhumane bouts of overtime of up to 34 hours without a pay increase and suggested that debilitating workplace accidents and suicides may be common. A Hong Kong non-profit organisation, Students and Scholars Against Corporate Misbehaviour, has written numerous negative reports on Foxconn's treatment of its employees, such as in 2010 and 2011. These typically find far worse conditions than the 2012 Fair Labour Association audit did, but they rely on a far smaller number of employee informants, circa 100 to 170. The Fair Labor Association audit in 2012 used interviews with 35,000 Foxconn employees.

In January 2012, about 150 Foxconn employees threatened to commit a mass suicide in protest of their working conditions. One worker said the protest resulted from 600 workers being moved into a new "unbearable" factory location. In September 2012, a fight at worker dormitories in Taiyuan, Shanxi, where a guard allegedly was beating a worker, escalated into a riot involving 2,000 people and was quelled by security.

In October 2012, the company admitted that 14-year-old children had worked for a short time at a facility in Yantai, Shandong Province, as part of an internship programme, in violation of the minimum age of 16 for legal workers. Foxconn said that the workers had been brought in to help deal with a labor shortage, and Xinhua quoted an official saying that 56 underage interns would be returned to their schools. Reuters quoted Foxconn saying that 2.7 percent of its workforce in China were long- or short-term interns. In response to the scrutiny, Foxconn said it would cut overtime from the current 20 hours per week to less than nine hours a week.

Also in October 2012, there was a crisis concerning an injured worker in which 26-year-old Zhang Tingzhen suffered an electric shock and fell in a factory accident a year earlier. His doctors did immediate surgery to remove part of his brain, "[after which] he lost his memory and can neither speak, walk". When his father attempted to get compensation in 2012, Reuters reported that Foxconn told the family to transport and submit him for a disability assessment in Huizhou 70 km away, or it would cut off funding for his treatment. His doctors protested the move for fear of a brain haemorrhage en route, and the company stated that it was acting within labour laws. His family later sued Foxconn in 2012 and argued in court that Tingzhen had been summoned to the wrong city. In 2014, a court ruled that he had to be assessed in Huizhou to receive compensation, with Foxconn offering a settlement for the father to recant his criticisms, which was refused.

In February 2015, Beijing News reported that an official with the All China Federation of Trade Union (ACFTU), Guo Jun, said that Foxconn allegedly forced employees to work overtime, resulting in occasional death by karōshi or suicide. Jun also said that the illegal overtime resulted from a lack of investigation and light punishments. Foxconn, in return, issued a statement questioning Guo's allegations, arguing workers wanted to work overtime to earn more money.

In November 2017, the Financial Times reported that it had found several students working 11-hour days at the iPhone X plant in Henan province, violating the 40-hour-per-week mandate for children. In response, Foxconn announced that it has stopped the interns' illegal overtime work at the factory in which 3,000 students had been hired that September.

Since 2016, Foxconn has been replacing its workforce with robots, which have replaced 50% of Foxconn's labor force in 2016, and there are plans for completely automated factories.

In 2019, a report was issued by Taiwan News stating that some of Foxconn's managers had fraudulently used rejected parts to build iPhones.

In late 2022, working conditions were exacerbated by Zero-COVID policies leading to protests.

=== Suicides ===
Suicides among Foxconn workers have attracted the media's attention. Among the first cases to attract attention in the press was the death of Sun Danyong, a 25-year-old man who committed suicide in July 2009 after reporting the loss of an iPhone 4 prototype in his possession. According to The Telegraph, Danyong had been beaten by security guards.

There was also a series of suicides speculatively linked to low pay in 2010, though employees also noted that Foxconn paid higher wages than similar jobs. In reaction to a spate of worker suicides in which 14 people died in 2010, Foxconn installed suicide-prevention netting at the base of buildings in some facilities and promised to offer substantially higher wages at its Shenzhen production bases. In 2011, Foxconn also hired the PR firm Burson-Marsteller to help deal with the negative publicity from the suicides. That year, the nets seemed to help lower the death rate, although at least four employees died by throwing themselves off buildings.

In January 2012, there was a protest by workers about conditions in Wuhan, with 150 workers threatening to commit mass suicide if factory conditions were not improved. In 2012 and into 2013, three young Foxconn employees were reported to have died by jumping off buildings. In September 2014, employee and poet Xu Lizhi jumped to his death four days after signing a new three-year contract; his poems, published posthumously by friends, received widespread media attention. In January 2018, another suicide was reported by a factory worker, after 31-year old Li Ming jumped to his death off a building in Zhengzhou, where the iPhone X was being manufactured.

=== The Wisconsin Valley Project ===
The project originally committed in 2017 to investing $10 billion and employing up to 13,000 workers but has now shrunk to $672 million with 1,454 jobs.

=== Food poisoning ===
On 15 December 2021, 256 workers at Foxconn's Sriperumbudur factory developed Acute Diarrhoeal Disease due to food poisoning after eating food at the company-provided hostel. As a result of which, 159 workers were hospitalized. The workers were provided no information about this, due to which a rumor started spreading among the workers through WhatsApp that two workers had died. By 17 December there were sit-in protests in worker dormitories, by 10 pm of the same day, thousands of women workers of the factory staged protests on the Chennai-Bengaluru national highway, this was met by police detention of 67 women protestors and arrest of one journalist, with many of them being released a day later. Following the protests the factory was shut down for a week, with the state government and district administration investigating the worker conditions.

On 22 December the Food Safety Department sealed the kitchen of the dormitory finding rats and poor drainage. The rooms provided to workers were overcrowded, with them being forced to sleep on the floor, some even lacking toilets with a running water supply. Following the revelation of substandard living conditions, on 29 December Apple put the Foxconn plant on probation, with both Apple and Foxconn issuing statements on the dormitory and dining rooms conditions. In January 2022, after assuring Apple and the Tamil Nadu government that it had taken the necessary corrective measures, Foxconn began reopening its factory and resuming work in phases.

== Various corporate partnerships ==
The Mobility in Harmony Consortium was created in 2020 by Foxconn to promote a set of open standards for electric vehicles.

In 2020, Foxconn initiated MIH Alliance to create an open EV ecosystem that promotes collaboration in the mobility industry, with more than 2,200 companies joining the open standard since its launch. The company announced plans to become more involved as a contract assembler of EVs. In the same year, Foxconn partnered with Fiat Chrysler Automobiles N.V. and Yulon Group for a move into EVs. Foxconn has been holding the Hon Hai Tech Day (HHTD) event since 2020 to showcase its latest achievements. In HHTD21, Foxconn introduced for the first time three self-developed EV models: the Model C recreational vehicle, the Model E sedan, and the Model T electric bus.

In January 2021, Foxconn and Geely Holding Group signed a strategic cooperative agreement and will establish a joint venture company to provide OEM and customized consulting services relating to whole vehicles, parts, intelligent drive systems, and automotive ecosystem platforms to global automotive enterprises and ridesharing companies. In February 2021, it announced an agreement with EV startup Fisker Inc. to jointly produce more than 250,000 vehicles a year. In March 2021, Foxtron, the JV company of Foxconn and Yulon, announced cooperation with Nidec to strengthen the power on EV key component development.

In July 2021, Foxconn teamed up with CTBC Financial Holding Co., Ltd to create a new fund targeting EV investments. In June 2021, Foxconn invested T$995.2 million ($36 million) in Gigasolar Materials Corp to develop EV battery materials. In September 2021, Foxconn collaborated with Thailand's state-owned oil supplier PTT Public Co. to invest US$1–2 billion in launching an EV joint venture in Thailand. In the same month, Foxconn and Gogoro formed a strategic technology and manufacturing partnership to introduce new levels of manufacturing capabilities and scale for Gogoro battery swapping technologies and Smart Scooters. In October 2021, it agreed to purchase a former GM auto plant from Lordstown Motors and to purchase $50 million of the company's common stock. Under the agreement, Foxconn would use the plant to produce Lordstown's Endurance pickup truck. Fisker vehicles would also be made at the same plant.

In January 2022, Foxconn signed an MoU with the Indonesian Ministry of Investment/BKPM, IBC, Indika, and Gogoro to jointly develop a sustainable new energy ecosystem in Indonesia that focuses on electric batteries, electric mobility, and associated industries. In May 2022, Foxconn announced the completion of the Lordstown Motors facility purchase and further signed a contract manufacturing agreement and a joint venture agreement with LMC for product development.

In mid-2021, Foxconn announced that the company would enter into more semiconductor production and will be expanding into supplying chips for electric vehicles (EVs) and electronics equipment used for healthcare. In May 2021, Foxconn and Yageo Group entered into a joint venture agreement to form XSemi Corporation ("XSemi") to extend the businesses into the semiconductor industry, including product development and sales. Based in Hsinchu, Taiwan, XSemi aims to consolidate the strengths and resources of the two market leaders, in addition to the upcoming multifaceted collaborations with leading semiconductor companies in product design, process and capacity planning, and sales channel. In August 2021, Foxconn acquired a Macronix 6-inch Wafer Fab for US$90.8mn.

In February 2022, Foxconn formed a joint venture company with Vedanta Limited, one of India's leading multinational groups, to manufacture semiconductors in India. Foxconn dropped out of the deal in July 2023. In April 2022, it was announced Foxconn had acquired the wireless telecommunications company, arQana Technologies – with the new organization being rebranded as "iCana". Foxconn also announced a merger with the integrated circuit designing firm AchernarTek for an undisclosed amount. The acquisition and consolidation will help Foxconn develop semiconductors for the automotive sector and 5G infrastructure. In September 2022, Foxtron, the automotive division of Foxconn works with Luxgen to launch its first electric vehicle, Luxgen n7.

In October 2026, Foxconn subsidiary Lin Yin International Investment agreed to acquire a 50% stake in Mitsubishi Electric Mobility from Mitsubishi Electric for ¥115 billion. The transaction was expected to close in October 2027, after which the companies would jointly operate the automotive-equipment business.

== See also ==
- 2010 Chinese labour unrest
- List of companies of Taiwan
- List of electronics companies
- Luxshare
- Pegatron
- Wistron
