= A. Surya Prakash =

Indian journalist and author

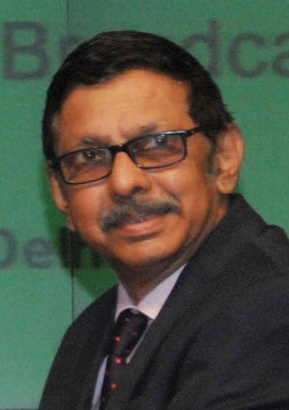
- Surya Prakash in 2017
- Education: M.A. in Sociology, University of Mysore; D.Litt., Tumkur University
- Occupations: Journalist, Author
- Known for: Chairperson of Prasar Bharati
- Awards: Padma Bhushan (2025); Rajyotsava Award (2010)

Arkalgud Anantaramaiah Surya Prakash popularly known as A. Surya Prakash is an Indian journalist and author, best known for serving as the chairperson of Prasar Bharati, India’s public service broadcaster. He has worked in various leading media organisations and is the author of several books on Indian politics and parliamentary democracy.

In January 2025, Prakash was conferred with the Padma Bhushan, India's third-highest civilian award, for his contributions to literature and education.

== Career ==
A. Surya Prakash has held senior editorial roles in major Indian and international news organisations. He served as:

- Chief of Bureau at Indian Express
- Executive Editor at The Pioneer
- India Editor for Asia Times
- Political Editor of the Eenadu Group
- Editor of Zee News

He is also known for his analysis of Indian democracy and parliamentary practices. He was appointed a member of the search panel for selecting the anti-corruption ombudsman, the Lokpal.

== Education ==
Prakash holds a Master’s degree in Sociology from the University of Mysore and was awarded a Doctor of Letters (D.Litt.) by Tumkur University.

== Works ==
He is the author of two notable books:

- What Ails Indian Parliament
- The Emergency - Indian Democracy’s Darkest Hour
- Democracy, Politics and Governance (and its Hindi version Loktantr, Rajniti aur Dharm), released by Vice President M. Venkaiah Naidu on 26 November 2021 in the Central Hall of Parliament.

== Awards ==
- Padma Bhushan (2025) for literature and education
- Rajyotsava Award (2010) – Government of Karnataka
