= Togdan Rinpoche =

Indian lama of Tibetan Buddhism (1938–2023)

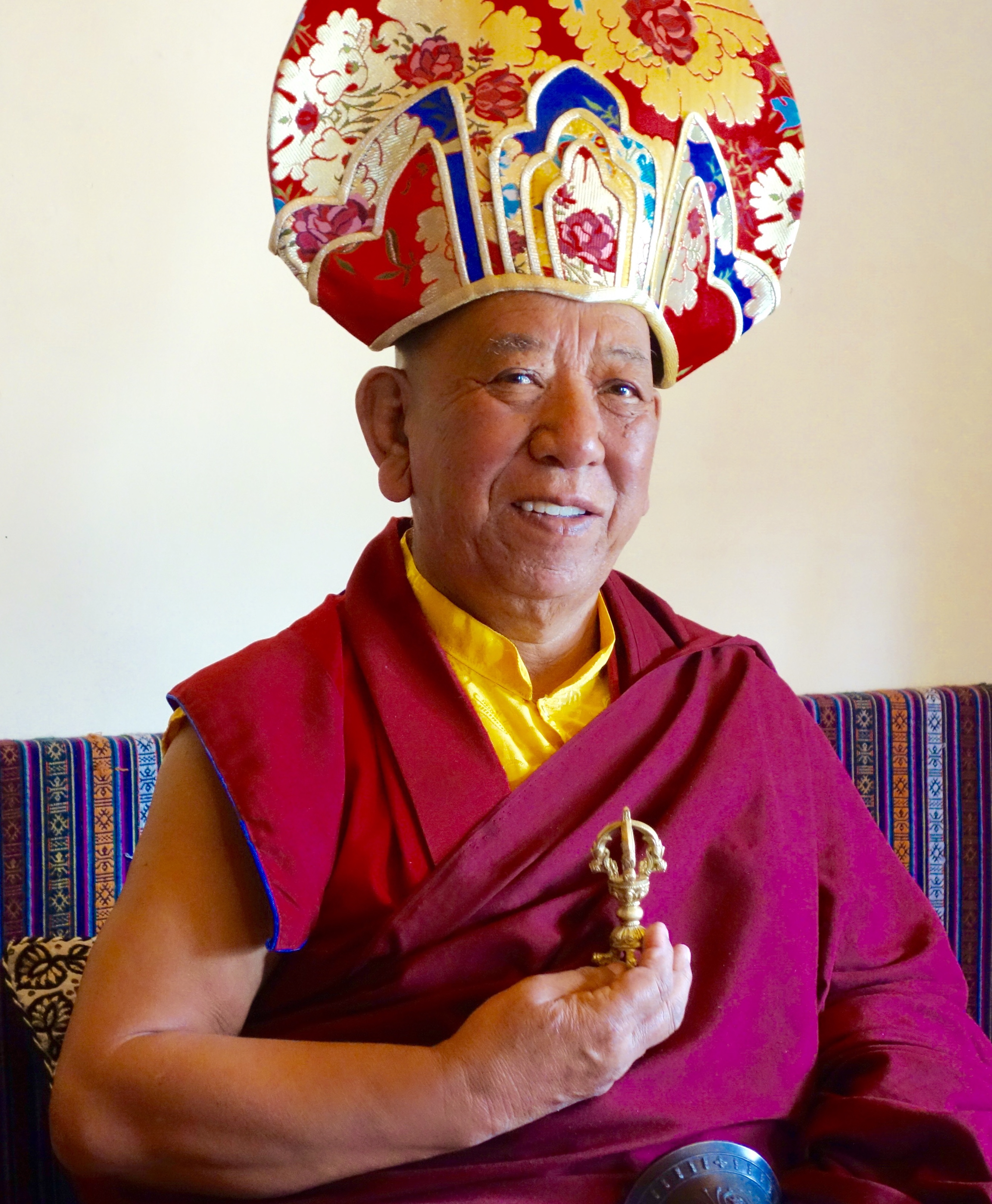

Personal life
- Born: 1938 Durbuk, Ladakh
- Died: May 23, 2023 (aged 84–85)
- Website: togdanrinpoche.com

Religious life
- Religion: Buddhism

Senior posting
- Teacher: Dudjom Rinpoche
- Based in: Ladakh, India
- Reincarnation: Togdan Tulku

Togdan Rinpoche (1938 – May 24, 2023) was an Indian lama of Tibetan Buddhism. He was enthroned as the leader of Drikung Kagyu lineage for Ladakh in 1943 and served as the Head Lama for all Tibetan Buddhist lineages in Ladakh. Togdan Rinpoche was one of the most senior lamas of the Drikung Kagyu and Nyingma lineages.

In addition to being an accomplished spiritual leader, Rinpoche played an active role in politics from the 1960s when he was elected as the first leader of the Ladakh Action Committee, until 2003 when he resigned from his post as the Minister of State for Ladakh Affairs and Planning.

== Appearances ==
Togdan Rinpoche has appeared in two documentary films, including Yogis of Tibet and The Tibetan Book of the Dead: A Way of Life. Rinpoche can also be seen in archive footage from 1965 in a Long Life Prayer for Dudjom Rinpoche, Rinpoche's root teacher.

== Rinchen Terdzö ==
Togdan Rinpoche was a lineage holder for the teaching cycle of Jamgon Kongtrul the Great, Treasury of Precious Treasures and sponsored one of the most important transmission of this cycle that takes up to 6 months to transmit in Tso Pema by his root teacher Dudjom Rinpoche in 1965. He since then completed several transmissions of this highly regarded teaching cycle.

== Terma ==
In accord with the Terma tradition of the Tibetan Buddhism and particularly the Nyingma order, Togdan Rinpoche was a terton and revealed the Padma Gyalpo Heart Essence Sadhana, which have been recently translated into English and Chinese. The teaching cycle was authenticated by Dudjom Rinpoche during the time he was the supreme leader of the Nyingma order. He died on May 24, 2023, at the age of 85.
