= Longhua Science and Technology Park =

Technology park in Longhua Town, Shenzhen, China

Coordinates: 22.6586°N 114.0466°E

- Simplified Chinese: 深圳富士康龙华园区
- Traditional Chinese: 深圳富士康龍華園區
Transcriptions
Standard Mandarin
- Hanyu Pinyin: Shēnzhèn Fùshìkāng Lónghuá Yuánqū
Yue: Cantonese
- Jyutping: sam1 zan3 fu3 si6 hong lung4 waa4 jyun4 keoi1

Science and Technology Park (深圳富士康龙华园区) is a technology park in Longhua Town, Shenzhen, in the south of China, that is Foxconn's largest factory site worldwide. It gained notoriety in 2010 after a spate of suicide attempts, many of them successful, by employees at the Foxconn facilities in the area, totaling 15 attempts that year, 10-13 of which were fatal.

The park produces the bulk of Apple's iPhone line. Hundreds of thousands of workers (varying counts include 230,000, 300,000, and 450,000) are employed at the site, a walled campus sometimes referred to as "Foxconn City". Covering about 3 km^{2} (1.2 sq mi), it includes 15 factories, worker dormitories, 4 swimming pools, a fire brigade, its own television network (Foxconn TV), and a city centre with a grocery store, bank, restaurants, bookstore, and hospital. While some workers live in surrounding towns and villages, others live and work inside the complex; a quarter of the employees live in the dormitories, and many of them work up to 12 hours a day for 6 days each week.
