= Francesca Fremantle =

Scholar and translator

Francesca Fremantle is a scholar and translator of Sanskrit and Tibetan works of Hindu and Buddhist tantra, and was a student of Chögyam Trungpa for many years. Fremantle worked closely with Chögyam Trungpa on the 1975 translation of the Tibetan Book of the Dead (Shambhala).

Her 2001 revised combination of a translation of excerpts is embedded within an extended commentary on the Tibetan Book of the Dead, entitled Luminous Emptiness (Shambhala).

Fremantle received her doctorate from the School of Oriental and African Studies, University of London. She is a teacher with the Longchen Foundation, established by Chögyam Trungpa and Dilgo Khyentse, and directed by Rigdzin Shikpo.

She lives in London.
