= Karma Lingpa =

Tibetan writer

- Tibetan: ཀརྨ་གླིང་པ་, Wylie: kar ma gling pa

Personal life
- Born: 1326
- Died: 1386 (aged 59–60)

Religious life
- Religion: Tibetan Buddhism
- Order: Nyingma
- Profession: Tertön, revealer of the Bardo Thodol.

Senior posting
- Reincarnation: Chokro Lü Gyeltsen

Karma Lingpa (1326–1386) was the tertön (revealer) of Bardo Thodol, also known as The Tibetan Book of the Dead. Tradition holds that he was a reincarnation of Chokro Lü Gyeltsen, (Note: Wylie: cog ro klu'i rgyal mtshan) a disciple of Padmasambhava.

== History ==
Karma Lingpa was born in southeast Tibet as the eldest son of Nyida Sanggyé, (Note: Wylie: nyi zla sangs rgyas) a great Vajrayana practitioner. At an early age, Karma Lingpa engaged in esoteric practices and achieved many siddhi.

When he was fifteen years old, he discovered several terma texts on top of Mount Gampodar, including a collection of teachings entitled "Profound Dharma of Self-Liberation through the Intention of the Peaceful and Wrathful Ones" (zab-chos zhi khro dgongs pa rang grol, also known as kar-gling zhi-khro), which includes the two texts of bar-do thos-grol, the so-called "Tibetan Book of the Dead".

According to Chogyam Trungpa, Karma Lingpa was a Nyingma teacher, but all of his students belonged to the Kagyu school. His teachings were transmitted in the Surmang monasteries of the Trungpa-lineage, and from there also spread to the Nyingma school.

The bar-do thos-grol was translated into English by Kazi Dawa Samdup (1868-1922), and edited and published by W.Y. Evans-Wenz. This translation became widely known and popular as "the Tibetan Book of the Dead", but contains many mistakes in translation and interpretation.

Another text from the "Profound Dharma of Self-Liberation" is "Self-Liberation through seeing with naked awareness" (rigpa ngo-sprod (Note: Full: rigpa ngo-sprod gcer-mthong rang-grol)), which gives an introduction, or pointing-out instruction (ngo-spro), into rigpa, the state of presence and awareness.

== Sources ==
- Fremantle, Francesca (2001), Luminous Emptiness: understanding the Tibetan Book of the dead, Boston, MA: Shambhala Publications, ISBN 1-57062-450-X
- Norbu, Namkhai (1989), "Foreword", in Reynolds, John Myrdin (ed.), Self-liberation through seeing with naked awareness, Station Hill Press, Inc.
- Reynolds, John Myrdin (1989), "Appendix I: The views on Dzogchen of W.Y. Evans-Wentz and C.G. Jung", in Reynolds, John Myrdin (ed.), Self-liberation through seeing with naked awareness, Station Hill Press, Inc.
