= Vietnam: Lotus in a Sea of Fire =

1967 book

- Author: Thích Nhất Hạnh
- Language: English
- Genre: Non-Fiction
- Publisher: Parallax Press
- Publication date: 1967
- Pages: 192
- ISBN: 9781952692031

Vietnam: Lotus in a Sea of Fire is a book written by Buddhist monk Thích Nhất Hạnh with a foreword contributed by Thomas Merton. The book chronicles Nhất Hạnh's perspective living through the Vietnam War. Nhất Hạnh presents the conflict as being focused on sovereignty rather than ideology for most Vietnamese and creates a plan for peace. The book is notable for being the first English-language work published by Nhất Hạnh and for coining the term engaged Buddhism.

== Background ==
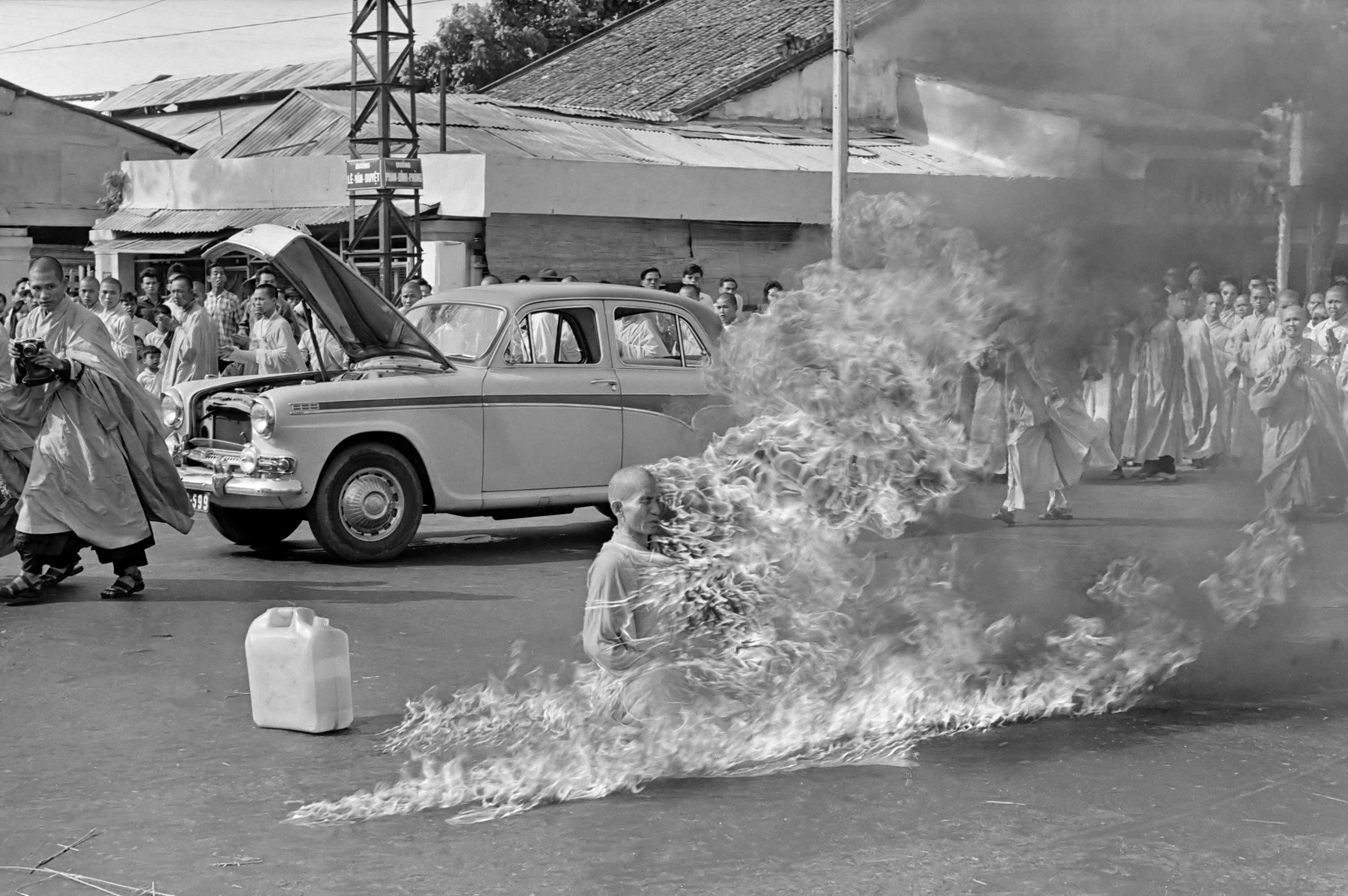
Thích Quảng Đức's self-immolation during the Buddhist crisis in Vietnam.

The book was published in the United States under the name Vietnam: Lotus in a Sea of Fire in 1967 and distributed underground in Vietnam under the name Hoa Sen Trong Biển Lửa. The work is rooted in Vietnam's unique Buddhism involving elements of Mahāyāna, Theravada, Thiền (Zen), and Pure Land traditions and building off existing movements in Vietnam. Scholars note that engaged Buddhism, the term coined by Nhất Hạnh in the book, is a translation of a concept Nhất Hạnh was engaged in with other Buddhist groups and that already existing in 20th century Vietnamese Buddhism and ongoing reforms in Asian Buddhism such as those introduced by Taixu. In the book Nhất Hạnh writes "Actualized Buddhism is not something new but has its roots deep in the past.” It is “the spirit of openness and tolerance that characterizes Buddhism." The title is notable for the recontextualization of the symbol of a Lotus in the mud typically used to symbolize nirvana emerging from samsara but instead of mud the lotus is in the fires of the war, weapons, burned villages, and self-immolation of Thich Quang Duc.

During the 1950s and early 1960s, Nhat Hanh took on leadership roles that foreshadowed his writing and activism. In the early 1950s, he founded The First Lotus Flowers of the Season, a magazine advocating for reform, and later became the editor of Vietnamese Buddhism, the official periodical of the Unified Buddhist Church of Vietnam, which united various Buddhist traditions in response to government persecution. After Vietnamese Buddhism was shut down by conservative Buddhist leaders, Nhat Hanh was undeterred and continued to write against government repression and the escalating war in Vietnam.

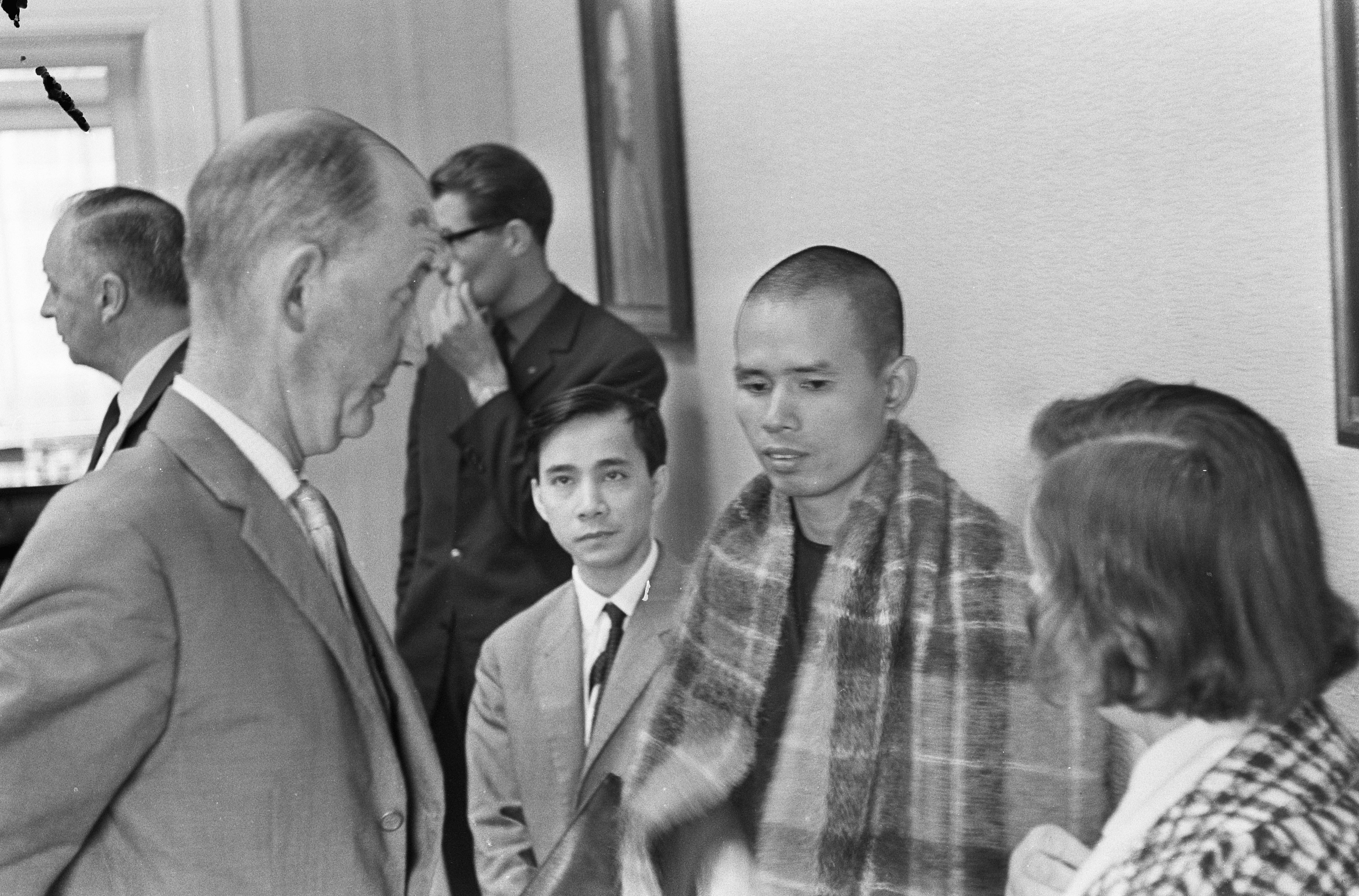
Thich Nhat Nanh in 1966

In 1961, Nhat Hanh traveled to the United States to study comparative religion at Princeton University. The following year, he was invited to teach Buddhism at Columbia University. By 1963, as the Diem regime increased its crackdown on Vietnamese Buddhists, Nhat Hanh traveled across the US to rally support for peace efforts in Vietnam. After Diem's fall, he returned home in 1964 and committed himself to peace activism alongside fellow monks. Nhat Hanh became a prominent anti-war advocate and founded the School of Youth for Social Service (SYSS), which trained 10,000 volunteers based on the Buddhist principles of non-violence and compassionate action to provide education, healthcare, and essential infrastructure to rural Vietnamese villages. In February 1966, he co-founded the Order of Interbeing with other SYSS leaders, creating an international sangha devoted to inner peace and social justice, grounded in his belief in the interbeing.

On May 1, 1966, at Tu Hieu Temple, Nhat Hanh received dharma transmission from Master Chan That, becoming a teacher in the Lieu Quan dharma lineage of the Lam Te Dhyana school's forty-second generation. Soon after, he toured North America, advocating for an end to the Vietnam War. He appealed to US Secretary of Defense Robert S. McNamara to halt bombings and presented a five-point peace proposal at a press conference. During this trip, he also met Thomas Merton, a Trappist monk and social activist. Merton, recognizing Nhat Hanh as a kindred spirit, later published the essay “Nhat Hanh Is My Brother.”

== Summary ==
Part 1: The Lotus in a Sea of Fire

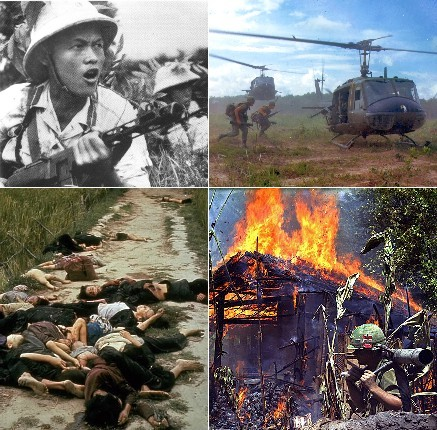
Images of the Vietnam War

After a foreword by Thomas Merton, the book opens with the self-immolation of Thich Quang Duc and Thich Nhat Hanh's struggle to help Westerners understand it, along with the complexities of Vietnamese Buddhism and other issues in Vietnam. Nhat Hanh describes the violence and greed affecting the country, highlighting how Buddhists are forced to respond as the population looks to them for help. He argues that the Unified Buddhist Church must engage in worldly affairs, and that Buddhism must actively engage in the life of the nation.

Part 2: The Historical Setting

Nhat Hanh provides background on the history of Buddhism in Vietnam and the various traditions that make up the Unified Buddhist Church. He recounts a story from Tran Thai Tong, who asserts that the Buddha exists in everyone. Therefore, Buddhists must fulfill their duties to their community while also nurturing their inner lives. Nhat Hanh explains the influence of Confucianism, Taoism, traditional beliefs, and Buddhism on Vietnam. He also explores how Mahāyāna Buddhism adapted to various cultures, contrasting this with the decline of Confucianism due to the introduction of Western education.

Nhat Hanh discusses the historic role of Catholic missionaries in Vietnam and the growing French influence, often tied to material and political goals rather than religious faith, and incompatible with Vietnamese culture. He argues that the French Catholic presence was introduced to support colonialism. Buddhists were recognized as part of the resistance to French colonialism, which led to their persecution by the pro-Catholic South Vietnamese government and the Buddhist Crisis. Nhat Hanh also acknowledges that there were progressive and patriotic Catholics who supported Vietnam and worked in the resistance. He recounts how Buddhist leaders and some Catholic priests called for peace, but were condemned by Catholic Church leadership.

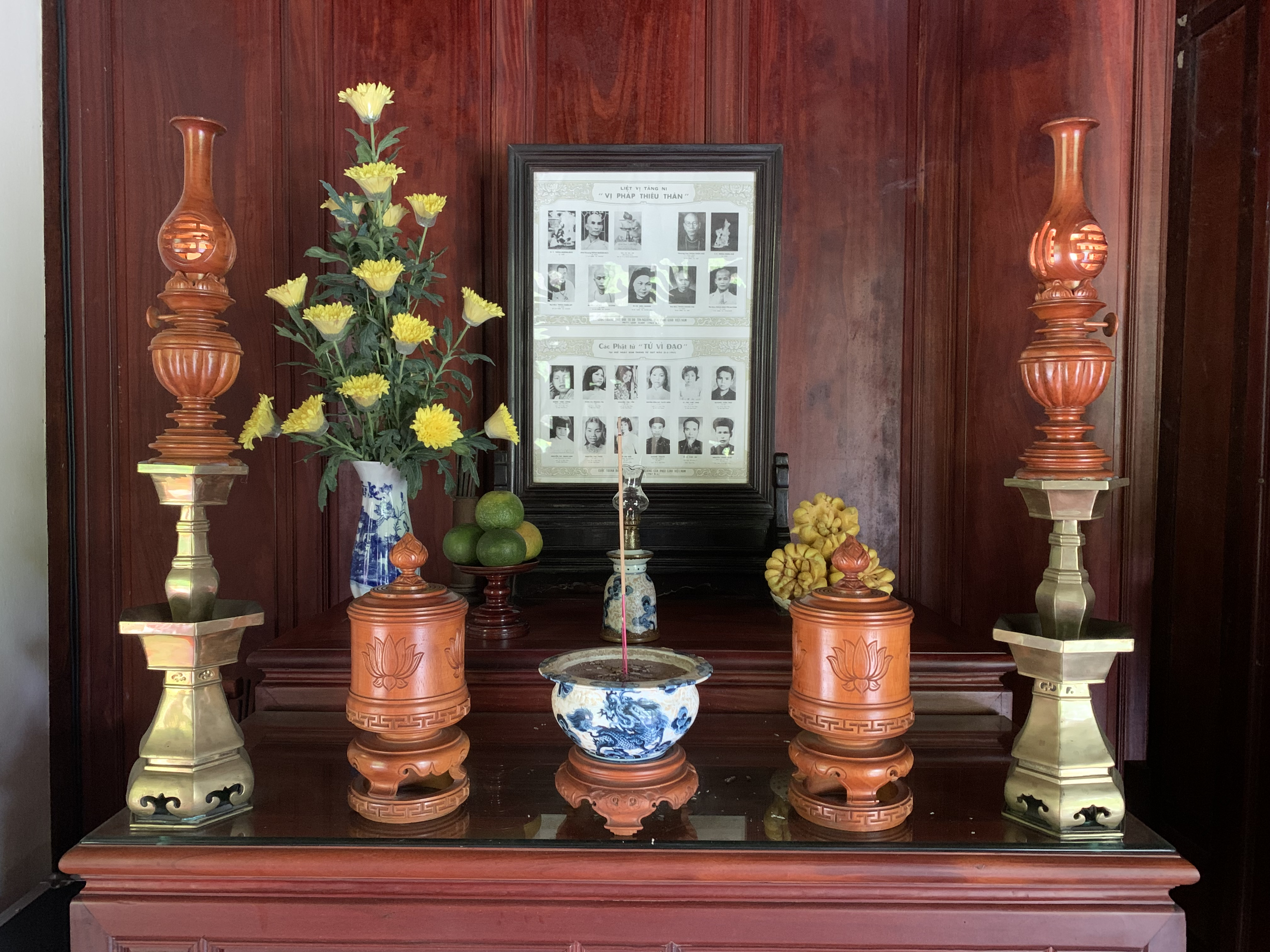
Victims of the Buddhist Crisis

Nhat Hanh goes on to explore the relationship between Buddhism and nationalism in various countries. He states that this nationalism is not extreme chauvinism but a form of resistance to foreign powers. He critiques Western misunderstandings of Buddhism and opposes efforts to align Buddhism with Chinese Communist ideology. Nhat Hanh details the Vietnamese Buddhist revival of the 1930s, which contributed to the development of "engaged Buddhism"—a movement in which Buddhist groups established orphanages, hospitals, literacy campaigns, and other forms of care, integrating Buddhism into every aspect of life (culture, economics, politics). Nhat Hanh notes that fear of change and dogmatism hinder progress, urging the Buddhist Church to focus on fulfilling its duty to society.

Part 3: The Struggle Today

Nhat Hanh discusses Vietnamese perspectives on French colonialism, explaining how nationalism and support for independence left little room for understanding both Communist and non-Communist approaches to achieving independence. He describes widespread distrust and opposition toward French officials, Vietnamese governments, and the United States, which financed and supported these regimes.

Nhat Hanh details the growth of the American military presence in Vietnam and its collaboration with the South Vietnamese government. He states that American soldiers were thrust into a situation where they risked death for what many considered meaningless, while the Vietnamese peasants primarily wanted the war to end or felt they must resist the Americans, whom they saw as aggressors. While the Vietnamese viewed the war as a matter of survival, Nhat Hanh contrasts this with the American perspective, shaped by media portrayals of American heroes fighting their foes. He describes the indiscriminate killing of Vietnamese by American forces and states that many peasants supported the Liberation Front, viewing the deaths as those of patriots, not as ideological communists.

Nhat Hanh argues that religious leaders must find a way to constructively combine religion and people's desire for patriotism in the face of ongoing colonialism. He states that religious devotion prevents many from joining the Communist front, but if religious leaders cannot recognize patriotism while remaining committed to peace, they will lose support, and the war will intensify. Nhat Hanh also addresses the harsh economic realities facing the Vietnamese people and the chaos caused by land reform. He argues that in this war scenario, people will do anything to survive, and priests and nuns cannot simply preach morality because the war is destroying both human lives and societal values.

Nhat Hanh explains that the Vietnamese are not legally able to call for peace, while the American government continues to justify its presence as an attempt to "save the Vietnamese people from Communism." He notes that past attempts to call for peace by intellectuals, Buddhist groups, and Americans led to widespread arrests or exile. Nhat Hanh argues that Vietnamese peasants do not understand the U.S. government's stated reasons for the war, and that the heart of the Vietnamese peasant is the real issue for the United States. He claims that through its military campaign, the U.S. is losing both psychologically and politically, tarnishing its image of revolution, freedom, and democracy.

Nhat Hanh asserts that the only way to end the war is to combine patriotism with peace, which neither side offers. For peace to be achieved, the United States should end its support of the puppet government and allow the Vietnamese to represent themselves. A self-governing, non-Communist Vietnam could negotiate independently, garnering support from both the Vietnamese people and many members of the National Liberation Front, who may not support the front ideologically but oppose the South Vietnamese puppet government. Nhat Hanh suggests that the new government should represent the political and religious groups of South Vietnam. Furthermore. the U.S. should halt all bombings and offensive actions, withdraw most of its troops, and begin negotiations with North Vietnam. This would undermine the notion that the Communists are the only defenders of Vietnam, and allow patriotic but non-ideological Vietnamese to join the National Liberation Front. Nhat Hanh stresses that religious leaders must actively lend their voices to peace and find practical ways to end the war, with Catholics and Buddhists working together to realize peace.

Part 4: Conclusion

Nhat Hanh addresses calls for him to choose a side in the conflict, addressing suggestions that peace could be achieved through the victory of that side. He rejects this approach, arguing that neither side truly represents the Vietnamese people. Nhat Hanh calls for Buddhists to work together with Catholics for peace, and stresses that Buddhism must adapt to retain its essence across different countries, times, and circumstances. He warns that any rigid formulation would imprison Buddhism and dilute its message. Nhat Hanh concludes by stating that the goal of Buddhism in Vietnam at this time is to actualize its teachings in the present period, while protecting and developing the country's spiritual heritage. He believes that the spirit of openness and tolerance that characterizes Buddhism guarantees its ability to adapt to the ideologies in Vietnam and further the cause of peace.

== Reception and legacy ==
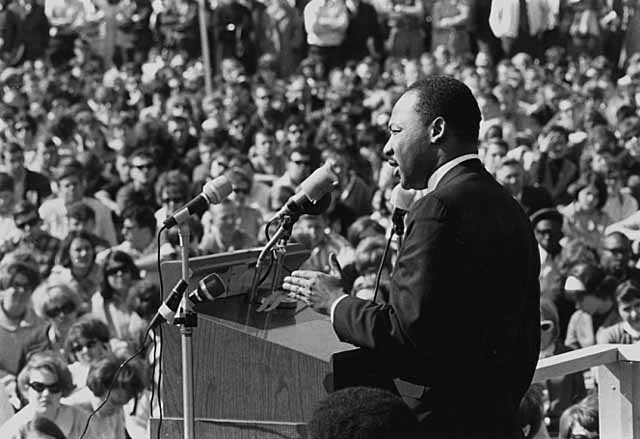
Martin Luther King Jr. speaking to an anti-Vietnam War rally at the University of Minnesota on April 27, 1967

At its original publication of the book received a positive review from Kirkus Reviews which described it as a "startling other-view of the war in Vietnam" and "essential reading for the informed". The book is notable for being the first English-language book of approximately 100 books by Thích Nhất Hạnh. It is also notable for coining the term engaged Buddhism and growing the anti-war movement in the United States. Additionally, the book serves as an introduction to Nhất Hạnh's early thoughts and approach, which later influenced the development of the Plum Village Monastery in France and the larger Plum Village Tradition.

Nhat Hanh urged Martin Luther King Jr. to oppose the war and in 1967, King spoke out against the war and stated his anti-war stance was influenced by Nhat Hanh. Also in 1967, after the publication of the book, Martin Luther King Jr. nominated Nhất Hạnh for the Nobel Peace Prize. Soon after in the early 1970s Nhất Hạnh moved to Paris to chair the Vietnamese Buddhist Peace Delegation and became involved with the Paris Peace Accords which ended American involvement in the Vietnam War. For refusing to take sides in the war, Nhat Hanh was exiled by both the North and South Vietnamese governments and received asylum in France where he would establish Plum Village.

== See also ==
- History of Vietnam
- Buddhist Ethics
- History of communism
- Peace movement
- Exile
- Anti-communism
- List of conflicts related to the Cold War
- List of wars involving the United States
