= Plum Village =

Plum Village may refer to:

- Plum Village Tradition, a school of Buddhism
- Plum Village Monastery, a Buddhist monastery of the Plum Village Tradition in southern France.
- Plum Village Community of Engaged Buddhism, the governance body of the monasteries, press and fundraising organizations established by Zen Buddhist monk Thích Nhất Hạnh.
