= Community of Mindful Living =

Buddhist community in Berkeley, California

The Community of Mindful Living (CML) is a Buddhist community located in Berkeley, California. It was founded in 1983 by followers of the Vietnamese Buddhist monk Thích Nhất Hạnh and was incorporated in 1990 in California as a nonprofit religious organization. CML provides support for individuals and meditation groups (sanghas) worldwide who wish to practice in the tradition of Zen Buddhism associated with Thích Nhất Hạnh. It also assists with the organization of retreats offered by Hanh and lay teachers in the United States and Canada. In December 1999, CML officially became a “Doing Business As” (DBA) arm of the Unified Buddhist Church, the governing body for Hanh's various affiliated organizations.

The Community of Mindful Living is one of centers from which the Plum Village Tradition approach is disseminated in the West.

The Mindfulness Bell magazine is published by CML three times a year and contains “Dharma Talks” by Thich Nhat Hanh, articles by members of the Order of Interbeing, both monastic and lay, and announcements of retreats, activities, and other items of interest.

== See also ==
- Engaged Buddhism
- Order of Interbeing
- Unified Buddhist Church
