= Plum Village Tradition =

School of Buddhism

The Plum Village Tradition is a school of Buddhism named after the Plum Village Monastery in France, the first monastic practice center founded by Thích Nhất Hạnh, Chân Không, and other members of the Order of Interbeing. It is an approach to Engaged Buddhism mainly from a Mahayana perspective, that draws elements from Thiền, Zen, and Pure Land traditions. Its governing body is the Plum Village Community of Engaged Buddhism.

It is characterized by elements of Engaged Buddhism, focused on improving lives and reducing suffering, as well as being a form of applied Buddhism, practices that are a way of acting, working, and being. The tradition includes a focus on the application of mindfulness to everyday activities (sitting, walking, eating, speaking, listening, working, etc.). These practices are integrated with lifestyle guidelines called the "five mindfulness trainings", (a version of the Five Precepts), which bring an ethical and spiritual dimension to decision-making and are an integral part of community life.

== History ==
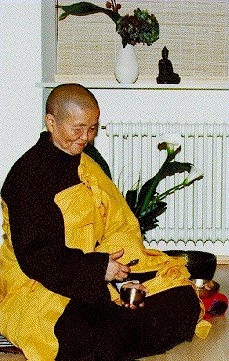
Chân Không

The Plum Village tradition grew out of the teachings and community building of Thích Nhất Hạnh (born Nguyễn Xuân Bảo) and Chân Không (born Cao Ngoc Phuong), and other members of the Order of Interbeing. The tradition is rooted in traditional Vietnamese monasticism but was also influenced by the reform movements happening in Vietnam during the 20th century.

During the Vietnam War Nhất Hạnh and Không developed and headed the School of Youth for Social Service (SYSS), a neutral corps of 10,000 Buddhist peace workers who went into rural areas to establish schools, build healthcare clinics, and help rebuild villages.

Members of the SYSS would later form the Order of Interbeing, named after the concept of interbeing and the Brahmavihara, to bring Buddhist principles into modern practice. This version of the Brahmavihara is grounded in what Plum Village calls the Four Spirits including "the spirit of non-attachment from views, the spirit of direct experience of the nature of interdependent origination through meditation, the spirit of appropriateness, and the spirit of skillful means. All four are to be found in all Buddhist traditions". Nhất Hạnh ordained six social workers into this new order, including Nhất Chi Mai, and provided them with fourteen precepts of Engaged Buddhism, now known as "mindfulness trainings". The precepts represented an adaptation of the traditional bodhisattva vows.

Nhất Hạnh traveled to the United States to teach and rally opposition to the war while Không managed the SYSS. Nhất Hạnh and Không then represented the Unified Buddhist Church (Église Bouddhique Unifiée) with Nhất Hạnh acting as the leader of the Vietnamese Buddhist Peace Delegation which became involved in the Paris Peace Accords. The Unified Buddhist Church would go on to assist refugees, assist children through Pour les Enfants du Vietnam and Partage avec les Enfants du Monde, and address disaster relief, technical training, schools, meals, and salaries for teachers and childcare workers. Exiled from Vietnam for refusing to take a side in the war, Nhất Hạnh and Không worked to help boat people in the Gulf of Siam then established the Sweet Potatoes Meditation Centre at Fontvannes near Troyes.

Outgrowing the Sweet Potatoes Meditation Centre, Nhất Hạnh, Chân Không, and other community members established Plum Village as a practice center in the Dordogne region of France and opened up the Order of Interbeing to the growing Vietnamese diaspora in France and Westerners. The tradition is named after this monastery which was named for the one thousand plum trees of Agen (prune d’Agen) planted there. The group formalized as a tradition while emphasizing the equality of laypeople and monastics and a nondenominational approach to Buddhism. The tradition grew to several monasteries across three continents, many lay-person sanghas across the world, and the eventual return of Nhất Hạnh to Vietnam where he established a presence at his root temple near Huế while the tradition remained headquartered in France.

=== Analysis ===
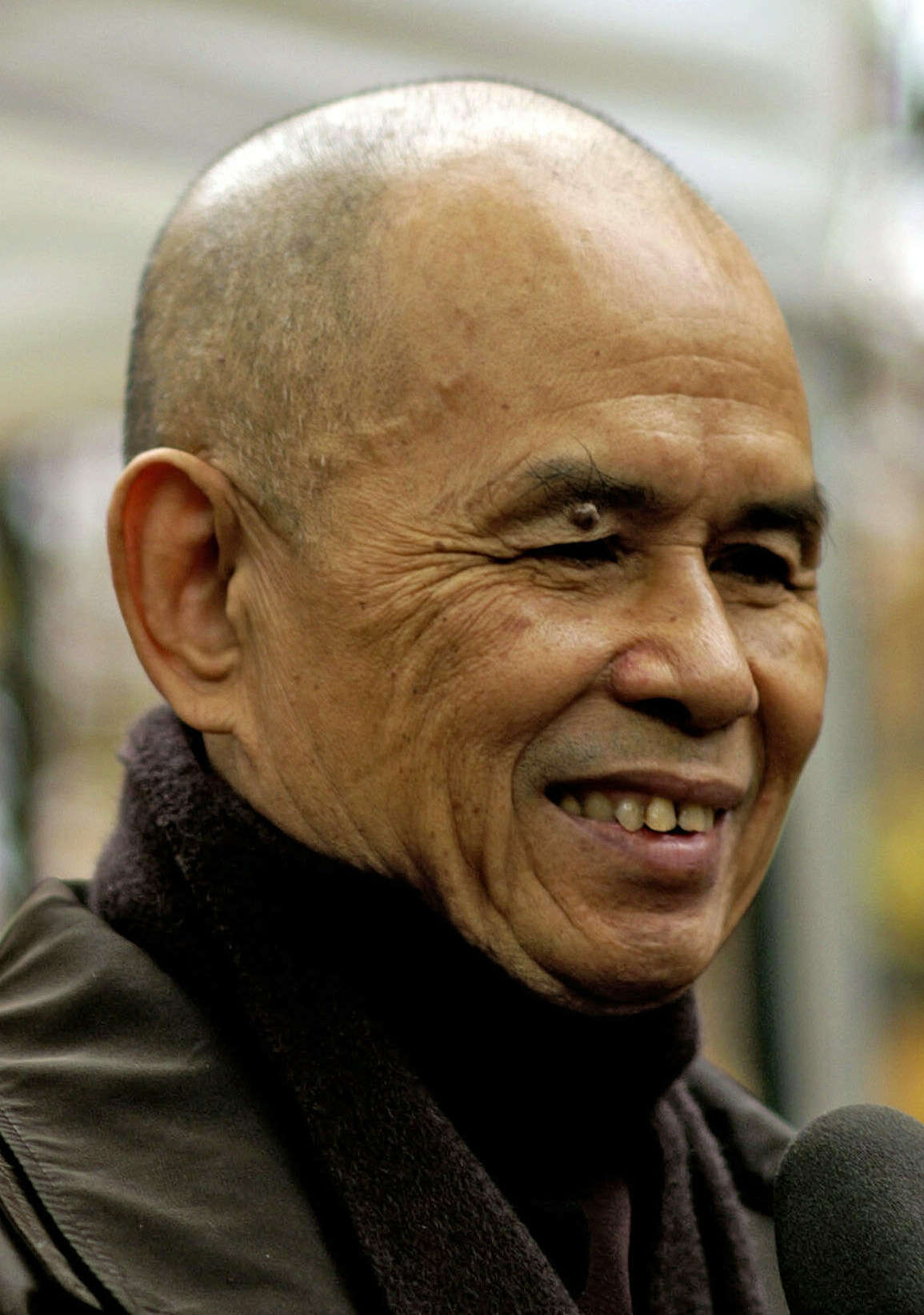
Thich Nhat Hanh

The tradition includes an emphasis on adaptation, typical of Buddhism, as it is said that the Buddha taught 84,000 versions of the Dharma, each one adapted to the needs of a different audience. The traditional includes a "post-merit model" approach for sustaining the organization that focuses on monastics working without financial gain, in an effort to improve the world, thus not relying solely on dana from lay people.

Scholar and member of the Order of Interbeing Adrienne Minh-Châu Lê notes it is an oversimplification to paint Thích Nhất Hạnh and the tradition as just about breathing, smiling, and living in the present moment. Scholars note the tradition is a product of Vietnamese Buddhism and a response to experiences of war, colonialism, and violence. Lê also notes that "Engaged Buddhism" in English is a translation of a concept that already existing in 20th century Vietnamese Buddhism and reforms in Asian Buddhism such as those introduced by Taixu. Scholars also note that view of collective karma written about by Nhất Hạnh contrasts with more individualistic western framings of Buddhism.

== Core tenets ==
=== Plum Village Dharma Seals ===
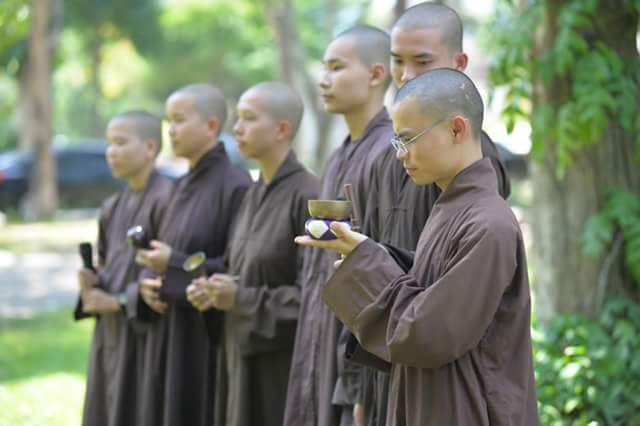
Plum Village Monastics

The four dharma seals of Plum Village were proposed by Thich Nhất Hanh to determine whether a teaching is in line with that of the Plum Village tradition.

"I have arrived, I am at home"

"Go as a river"

"The times* and the truths** inter-are".

"Ripening, moment-by-moment"

Noting *the three times are the past, present and future **the truths are the four Noble truths and also conventional and ultimate truth

The statement "I am at home" involves finding happiness in the present moment and that mindful breathing, walking, eating, and working are practices that help us arrive fully in each moment, no matter the situation. Even in times of suffering, staying "at home" with that suffering can bring freedom. To "go as a river" emphasizes living harmoniously within the sangha. This requires learning to function as a part of the "sangha body," both nourishing and being nourished by it. The Buddha devoted his life to building the sangha because it is through the collective strength of the sangha that their teachings can endure and thrive into the future. When challenges arise, we stay with our sangha, embrace the difficulty, and work together to transform it, continuing to flow as one unified river.

=== 40 Tenets of Plum Village ===
The 40 Tenets of Plum Village are an attempt by Nhất Hạnh to summarize the teachings that are maintained, taught, and transmitted in the Plum Village Tradition. In this tradition, Nirvāṇa is viewed not as a phenomenon but as the true nature of all phenomena. It is the absence of ignorance and afflictions, yet not the absence of existence, aggregates. Practices for attaining this liberation include mindfulness, concentration, and insight, which work together to recognize suffering, prevent wrong actions, and transform negative seeds. With the Four Foundations of Mindfulness one can transform habit energies such as store-consciousness and fully realize the Seven Factors of Enlightenment and the Noble Eightfold Path. These practices are grounded in the core teachings of impermanence, non-self, and Nirvāṇa, which are the Three Dharma Seals.

The Buddha, as taught in this tradition, is not a single, fixed being but exists in multiple forms and dimensions, including in the sangha, as is the interconnectedness of all things. Each person has the potential to become a Buddha, and the path to awakening involves recognizing the impermanent, interconnected nature of all phenomena, including the self. Rebirth is understood not as the continuation of a permanent self but is understood within impermanence, no-self and interbeing and the Four Noble Truths are viewed as both conditioned and unconditioned.

Within this view, the consequences of our actions (karma) are not limited to a single individual or aspect of existence. It encompasses the interconnectedness of body, mind, and the environment, as well as the collective impact of our actions on the community and the larger world. In line with the Bodhisattva path, each Arhat is also a Bodhisattva and any real Bodhisattva is an Arahat.

=== Other Tenets ===
==== Ethics ====
Ethics within the Plum Village tradition are based on active engagement with the world to reduce suffering. The tradition states that wrong-view (the inability to see impermanence, non-self, and interbeing) is the root cause of ill-being. The roots of discrimination, conflict, and war lie not in the external world but within our own mindset and perspective. The true adversary is our ignorance, our clinging to beliefs, complexes and our misguided perceptions. As such, behavior is not viewed as good or evil but as skillful or unskillful.

With right mindfulness, one can achieve right concentration and right view leading to right thinking rooted in compassion, interbeing, and understanding. Karma, being all actions, includes thinking, speaking, and bodily actions. Ethical choices should be made on the criteria of beneficial vs. un-beneficial, happiness vs. suffering, and delusion vs. awakening. Rooted in interbeing, and seeing others as also us, violence against others or the environment becomes impossible. Views are not rigid and should be practiced with non-attachment, for example, the five mindfulness trainings may not be understandable to people in the future or appropriate to the situation of the world and may need to be revised.

Ethics are related to the core teaching of mindfulness, which is deeply intertwined with the concept of Buddha-nature. Nhat Hanh emphasized that mindfulness practice is essential for transforming unwholesome seeds and nurturing wholesome ones, thereby overcoming obstacles to enlightenment. This transformation is possible because the seed of awakening, or Buddha-nature, is inherently present in all sentient beings. This aligns with the tradition's view on consciousness, including stored consciousness and mind consciousness, and using mindfulness and right action to improve them, their habit energies, and their seeds.

Teachings are also rooted in interbeing as the tradition states “Whether from our family or friends, from our society or education, all seeds are, by nature, both individual and collective". Plum Village also acknowledges the individual consciousness is affected by the collective consciousness causing people to absorb and reflect the world around them.

The tradition has made efforts to express teachings in a way that meets the needs of various cultures and addresses contemporary issues that cause harm. The tradition, in line with many modern and historic traditions, formally accepts LGBT individuals starting an initiative called "The Rainbow Family". The tradition is working to reduce gender disparities, address climate change, and other forms of engaged Buddhism in an effort to reduce suffering and support collective awakening. While vegetarianism isn't mandated, Plum Village practice centers and retreats have always been vegetarian, in line with Mahāyāna teachings and environmental consciousness, and are now vegan. Monastics make decisions based on deep listening and nonattachment of view.

==== Ancestry ====
The tradition recognizes three forms of ancestry, including blood ancestry, land ancestry, and spiritual ancestry, that root people and recognize their commonality. Blood ancestry results from conditions arising at birth, grounding us in a lineage. As such, when you meet someone, you are also meeting their entire lineage. This recognizes that it is painful to believe one is born alone, and instead one must understand that we are a continuation and not separate from others or our ancestors in all their forms. Within Plum Village one sees oneself as a river, a continuation of ancestors, parents, and grandparents, rather than as a separate individual. Within, ourselves we carry their experiences—their suffering and their joy—woven into one's very being. Through giving and receiving compassion, one can find healing for ourselves and, in turn, for them.

The tradition acknowledges that not all people had supportive childhoods. As such, one should strive to transmit something beautiful when we become ancestors and work to heal ourselves and, in doing so, heal the ancestors within us. The tradition also recognizes that not all people know their blood ancestors. One is also rooted in spiritual ancestors—those who have taught us how to love and understand—and land ancestors, who guide us to live humbly and in harmony with nature.

The Earth Touchings is a Plum Village practice that involves mindful prostrations. Through the prostrations, practitioners honor their blood, spiritual, and land ancestors, while also sending love to those they cherish and reconciling with those who have caused them suffering.

==== Love and Loving-Kindness ====
Plum Village emphasizes loving-kindness (mettā) which is to be practiced within mindfulness practices,

“Let our boundless love pervade the whole universe, above, below, and across. Our love will know no obstacles. Our heart will be absolutely free from hatred and enmity. Whether standing or walking, sitting or lying, as long as we are awake, we should maintain this mindfulness of love in our own heart. This is the noblest way of living. “Free from wrong views, greed, and sensual desires, living in beauty and realizing Perfect Understanding, those who practice boundless love will certainly transcend birth and death.”

Plum Village includes traditional definition of love as Metta (loving friendliness), karuna (compassion), Mudita (appreciative joy) and upekkha (equanimity) but views equanimity as also inclusiveness. Plum Village also related love back to insight created through mindfulness stating,

"Insight and love, they are the same. Insight brings love, and love is not possible without insight, understanding. If you do not understand, you cannot love. This insight is direct understanding, and not just a few notions and ideas. In meditation we allow ourselves to be shined on by the light of that insight."

==== Three Doors of Liberation ====
The three marks of existence (impermanence, suffering, and the absence of a separate self) form the Buddha’s fundamental insight into the nature of reality. Plum Village's teaching on the Three Doors of Liberation (emptiness, signlessness, aimlessness) provides a path to rise above duality, the source of all suffering, by aligning our lives with these truths. Per Plum Village, emptiness refers to being "empty of a separate self." Nothing exists independently; all things interconnect and depend on one another for existence. Signlessness challenges the attachment to appearances or forms. Just as water takes the shape of its container, perceptions are shaped by circumstances and are not the ultimate truth. Aimlessness emphasizes contentment in simply being. There is no need to strive for external validation or transformation; one’s purpose is to fully embody and appreciate their true nature.

== Key concepts ==
=== Interbeing ===
Nhất Hạnh developed the English term "interbeing" by combining the prefix "inter-" with the verb "to be" to denote the interconnection of all phenomena. This was inspired by the Chinese word 相即 in Master Fa Zang's "Golden Lion Chapter", a Huayan summary of the Avatamsaka Sutra. Interbeing is an understanding that there is a deep interconnection between all people, all species, and all things based on non-duality, emptiness, and dependent co-arising (all phenomena arise in dependence upon other phenomena). As such, there is no independent separate self. As such, everything is empty of self-being and everything is full of everything. In short, everything depends for its existence on everything else. The concept of interbeing highlights how all psychological and physical phenomena are intertwined, interconnected, interdependent, and mutually influenced in reality and the world. This relationship is vividly illustrated in the Avatamsaka Sutra, which teaches that "everything contains everything else" and "everything penetrates everything else."

For example, a flower is composed entirely of elements that are not flowers, like chlorophyll, sunlight, and water. If all these non-flower elements were removed, there would be no flower left. A flower cannot exist independently but it can only exist in relationship with everything else.

In this view a person is composed of many elements beyond just themselves, such as their parents, ancestors from humans, plants, and animals, as well as water, sunlight, food, education, and life experiences. A person's body is constantly changing, and thoughts and emotions are always shifting. It is only the belief in a separate self that confines us, falsely separating the "I" vs others. As such, if one can see the nature of interbeing between oneself and others, one can see that others' suffering is one's own suffering, and others' happiness is one's own happiness. This rejects fictive narratives of a fixed self or self-story, but acknowledges the interconnections with everything from the air to food, ancestors, friends, and others.

Plum Village does not try to prove the truth of interbeing, but instead emphasizes the importance of recognizing its truth through meditation (generating mindfulness, insight, and concentration). Understanding interbeing is essential for overcoming suffering and reaching enlightenment, which is the ultimate goal in Buddhism. This insight into interbeing helps in particular by revealing that nothing is ever truly created or destroyed, which removes the fear of death or loss.

Interbeing is also a rejection of division, discrimination, alienation, and individualism. It has been an influence on many environmentalists.

=== Mindfulness ===
Rooted in Buddhist psychology, Plum Village states mindfulness is an energy and awareness one can create by bringing attention back to the body and connecting with the present moment, both inside and around each person and looking deeply into the nature of things. It involves being aware of our breath and returning to the body, allowing ourselves to be fully present for ourselves and whatever activity we are engaged in. Through mindfulness people may generate collective energy that can help bring healing and transformation to each person and the world.

The tradition teaches mindfulness within the framework of ethics. Along with mindfulness comes mindful consumption, relationships, and livelihood. Mindfulness cannot be separated from how we speak, act, work, and interact with the world. Per the tradition, mindfulness is not a tool for achieving something else—whether it’s healing, relaxation, success, wealth, or victory. True mindfulness is a path and an ethical way of living. Every step along this path brings happiness, freedom, and well-being to ourselves and others. Happiness and well-being are not individual matters as we "inter-are with all people and all species". This understanding is applied to key teachings across a range of life from business to education.

While mindfulness has become a billion-dollar industry, Plum Village cautions against "McMindfulness" and using mindfulness as a tool (including to be effective at our jobs or for some superficial relief) making a differentiation between right mindfulness and wrong mindfulness. Plum Village emphasizes that right mindfulness does not pursue ego, status, and pride but is linked to the eight-fold path, awareness, love, community, and addressing suffering. Though Plum Village also teaches that mindfulness and meditation are open and helpful to people of all faiths.

Plum Village's teachings on mindfulness are related to Nhat Hanh's experiences in war-torn Vietnam with Nhat Hanh stating "Buddhism has to do with your daily life, with your suffering and with the suffering of the people around you. You must learn how to help a wounded child while still practicing mindful breathing. You should not allow yourself to get lost in action. Action should be meditation at the same time."

Nhat Hanh stated “Our most important task is to develop correct insight. If we see deeply into the nature of interbeing, that all things ‘inter-are,’ we will stop blaming, arguing, and killing, and we will become friends with everyone. To practice nonviolence, we must first of all learn ways to deal peacefully with ourselves.” As such people are not just “making peace” but “being peace”

Nhat Hanh is credited with popularizing the term and the practice of mindfulness, particularly in the Western world, with the term rarely being used in English before his work. Plum Village's mindfulness teachings influenced mindfulness-based cognitive therapy, Dialectical Behavior Therapy (DBT), and Mindfulness-Based Stress Reduction.

=== Engaged Buddhism ===
Engaged Buddhism is a movement to apply Buddhist ethics including the bodhisattva path, giving (dana) and loving-kindness (metta or maitri), and Noble Eightfold Path to the world. Thich Nhat Hanh coined the term "engaged Buddhism" in his 1967 book Vietnam: Lotus in a Sea of Fire. Nhat Hanh did not feel it was a new concept but was rooted in early Buddhist doctrine.

Plum Village's teachings on engaged Buddhism are related to Nhat Hanh's experiences in war-torn Vietnam with Nhat Hanh stating:

"Engaged Buddhism is just Buddhism. When bombs begin to fall on people, you cannot stay in the meditation hall all the time. Meditation is about the awareness of what is going on - not only in your body and in your feelings, but all around you,"

and

"When I was a novice in Vietnam, we young monks witnessed the suffering caused by the war and were very eager to practice Buddhism in such a way that we could bring it into society. That was not easy because the tradition did not directly offer Engaged Buddhism, so we had to do it by ourselves. That was the birth of Engaged Buddhism."

Engaged Buddhism was articulated, promoted, and discussed from the teachings of Nhất Hạnh. Engaged Buddhism has since become a core part of the Plum Village Tradition, and the term has spread and influenced traditions across the world.

== Five mindfulness trainings ==
The Five Mindfulness Trainings are Nhat Hanh's formulation of the traditional Buddhist Five Precepts, ethical guidelines developed during the time of the Buddha to be the foundation of practice for both the entire lay Buddhist community and the secular world, grounded in the Four Noble Truths and the Eightfold Path.

The mindfulness trainings address:

1. Reverence for Life: Awareness for cultivating the insight of interbeing and compassion, protecting lives of people, animals, plants, and minerals and seeing the harm from anger, fear, greed, and intolerance.
2. True Happiness: Awareness for seeing that the happiness and suffering of others are not separate from one's own happiness and suffering, true happiness is not possible without understanding and compassion, and that wealth, fame, power and sensual pleasures can bring suffering.
3. True Love: Awareness that sexual desire is not love, and that sexual activity motivated by craving always harms oneself as well as others. Also includes a focus on awareness to support non-discrimination against LGBT people.
4. Loving Speech and Listening: Awareness for cultivating loving speech and compassionate listening.
5. Nourishment and Healing: Awareness for cultivating good mental and physical health and consuming in a way that preserves peace, joy, and well-being.

In some other traditions these precepts are expressed as undertakings to refrain from harm - not to kill, not to steal, not to lie, not to manifest inappropriate sexual behavior, and not to consume intoxicants. Nhat Hanh's effort was to express these precepts with an emphasis on the cultivation of virtues on the one hand and as a practice of mindfulness on the other. Each 'Mindfulness Training' has the form: 'Aware of the suffering caused by ----, I am committed to cultivating ----'. Each training is thus an undertaking by the practitioner both to cultivate non-harming, generosity, responsible sexual behavior, loving speech, and mindful consumption and to be mindful of the suffering caused to self and others when these virtues are absent.

=== Fourteen mindfulness trainings ===
The fourteen mindfulness trainings apply to members of the Order of Interbeing and including openness, non-attachment to views, freedom of thought, awareness of suffering, compassionate healthy living, taking care of anger, dwelling happily in the present moment, true community and communication, thoughtful and loving speech, protecting and nourishing the sangha, right livelihood, reverence for life, generosity, and true love.

== Mindfulness practices ==
The sangha is built around a common set of practices to be performed with mindfulness applied to sensory experiences (like listening to the sound of a bell) or activities, such as walking or eating in community. There are also formal ceremonial practices normally performed by the monastics (prostrations, recitations, chanting). Community practices are aimed at facilitating the release from suffering, increasing joy, and experiencing fully the present moment.

The mindfulness practices of the Plum Village Tradition including daily practices include breathing (focusing the attention on the breathing sensory experience), waking up (a daily vow to live fully the awake cycle of consciousness), sitting meditation, walking meditation, and a bell of mindfulness (stopping to focus on the breathing sensory experience upon hearing a sound, normally of a bell).

Physical practices include resting (recognizing the natural needs of the body and take the necessary steps to attain rest), mindful movement (body movements practiced with conscious breathing to unite mind and body) and deep relaxation a practice of lying down and totally letting go, using the breath as an anchor.

Extended practices also apply to relationships and community including the sangha body (learning to recognize what each individual needs to feel part of a community), sangha building (awareness of organic growth processes of communities), dharma sharing (express experiences as they were felt and cognized), service meditation (volunteering to menial maintenance tasks), the kitchen (food preparation as a meditative practice), eating together (focusing on the several aspects of consuming food together with other people), tea meditation (being aware of all aspects of socializing including inner and interpersonal elements while drinking tea), noble silence (suspend or reduce verbal communication to focus on inner processes), and beginning anew (reconciliation process after a conflict). Additional mindfulness practices include living together (sharing the same living space), taking care of anger, going home (uncovering unconscious factors that evoke the feeling of being home, and expand that awareness), solitude (training inner stability in the subjective experience), touching the earth (performing prostrations to evoke a sense of connection with the biological and spiritual line), and taking refuge (Taking refuge: setting excellence goals for oneself, the relevant body of knowledge, and the community).

=== Mind and Store consciousness ===
Within Plum Village and Buddhist psychology more broadly, consciousness is divided into two parts: mind consciousness and store consciousness. Mind consciousness, similar to the Western "conscious mind," represents our active awareness and is engaged through mindfulness practices like breathing, walking, or eating with intention. Store consciousness, akin to the unconscious mind, is the foundation where all past experiences are stored. It operates in the background, allowing us to perform tasks like walking without active awareness. Within store consciousness are seeds (bija) of emotions and mental states such as anger, joy, or compassion. When these seeds are triggered by external conditions, they manifest in mind consciousness as mental formations. The role of store consciousness is to receive, sustain, and bring these seeds into reality while transforming habitual energies. It is also comparable to an ocean, which collects many rivers and has the capacity to manifest the seeds it holds.

There are many types of seeds from samsara, illusion, nirvana, suffering, and delusion to enlightenment and joy. Within store consciousness some seeds are innate, some handed down by, ancestors, some sown in the womb, and others sown when we were children. Plum Village teaches that all are both individual and collective.

Plum Village teaches that seeds are sown within the mind. Mindfulness allows one to meet these mental formations like anger with gentle awareness. Rather than suppressing or resisting, mindfulness acknowledges and embraces them, rooted in the understanding that both mindfulness and anger are parts of oneself. This practice of recognition is said to transform suffering into peace by nurturing and growing the seeds of mindfulness and concentration. Through consistent mindful activities, one strengthens their capacity to address afflictions with clarity and compassion. Nhat Hanh states that store consciousness is like a garden that preserves and nurtures all seeds within it. Through mindfulness, one develops awareness of these seeds, allowing them to identify and water the positive seeds so they may grow.

=== Mindfulness and emotions ===
With mindfulness, one is more than their emotions but is also form, feelings, perceptions, mental formations, and consciousness. Perceptions are impermanent, and one can feel an emotion, recognize it, meet it, and feel the actual sensation rather than the expectation of what the sensation should be. The goal is to not identify or attach to emotions such as suffering or happiness or be caught in stories about one's happiness or suffering. Addressing emotions is described can be addressed like holding a crying baby, instead of punishing the baby one can cradle it, embracing the emotion and meeting it with compassion.

Nhat Hanh describes emotions as this,

"Being at peace doesn't mean our thoughts and feelings are frozen. Being at peace is not the same as being anesthetized. A peaceful mind does not mean a mind empty of thoughts, sensations, and emotions...Fury, hatred, shame, faith, doubt, impatience, disgust, desire, sorrow, and anguish are also mind...Our mind is our self. We cannot suppress it. We must treat it with respect, with gentleness, and absolutely without violence."

Through life and even through meditation, one can feel emotions and sensations that are not always positive. Without suffering, people have no ways to cultivate understanding, insight, and compassion. It is by contacting suffering, touching suffering, and looking deeply at the nature of suffering that understanding arises. Plum Village also teaches that suffering is not ours alone but shared. Transforming suffering is possible, and can have an impact on the greater consciousness of our society. With an understanding of suffering it is natural that one develops the energy of compassion. And the energy of compassion, once developed begins to heal each person and the world. Understanding and compassion emerge from suffering, much like a lotus flower grows out of the mud. This is why avoiding suffering is not a wise approach. Because of this, it is important to practice not alone but supported by the Sangha, practice compassion, nourish, and develop insight into interbeing, impermanence, no-self, transforming collective consciousness, addressing the community, and the eightfold path.

Plum Village acknowledges that there is an inner child within everyone, and the inability to see that child within us is a form of ignorance. As ignorance is in each cell of our body and consciousness, so is an inner child and their suffering. Suffering arises from a lack of compassion and understanding. By cultivating mindfulness, along with the energies of understanding and compassion for our inner wounded child, we can significantly reduce our pain. Practices include listening to them with compassion and using mindfulness to improve stored consciousness, Rather than viewing healing as an individual pursuit, Plum Village emphasizes its collective. Our suffering is not isolated but influenced by and contributing to the consciousness of our ancestors, family, and community. Healing the inner child, therefore, becomes a practice of relieving collective suffering and nurturing love and understanding across generations.

=== Mindfulness, relationships, and romantic love ===
Beyond loving kindness for all and love within the sangha the traditional also acknowledges romantic love, creating challenges not experienced by monks and nuns. Thich Nhat Hanh’s How to Love explores love as a transformative practice rooted in mindfulness, compassion, understanding, and non-attachment rooted in physical, emotional, and spiritual intimacy and focused on shared aspirations. The text emphasizes the interconnectedness of individuals and stresses that love begins with self-acceptance and healing, not trying to fill a void.

A significant teaching in the book is that understanding is the essence of love. “Understanding someone’s suffering is the best gift you can give another person. Understanding is love’s other name.” Love is an active practice requiring nourishment, similar to tending a garden and including practices like mindfulness, metta meditation, deep listening, and community. These practices help individuals create harmony within themselves and their relationships, transforming everyday interactions into opportunities for joy and connection. Love also involves non-attachment, non-fear, and avoiding attempts to control, "You must love in such a way that the person you love feels free." and "nondiscrimination, to see the interconnectedness and impermanence of all things, and to share this wisdom with others, we are giving the gift of non-fear. Everything is impermanent. This moment passes. That person walks away. Happiness is still possible."

=== Boundaries with Plum Village Tradition ===
Within the Plum Village Tradition, there is acknowledgement that in the ultimate reality of interbeing, there are no boundaries, but in our everyday lives, boundaries are necessary to maintain harmony and protect ourselves. Boundless love and a mind attuned to interconnection are vital, but mindfulness is needed to set limits. The perspective is that a lack of boundaries can allow negativity to infiltrate, similar to “bacteria infecting a wound.” By guarding one’s mind and communities, the absorption of harmful energy can be avoided. Instead, through skillful compassion, one can transform suffering (both in themselves and others) into positive change.

It is important not to lose hope or confidence in oneself when unable to handle something immediately. Instead, this awareness should serve as motivation and determination to grow one’s capacity to face, embrace, and transform challenges. This perspective also recognizes that even enlightened beings are not omnipotent or capable of resolving everything instantly.

Healthy boundaries and authentic communication are essential for ensuring personal safety and well-being while fostering openness and vulnerability in relationships. Boundaries help us engage with others' suffering compassionately without depleting ourselves or losing control. They also encourage others to reflect on their actions and grow. By setting appropriate boundaries, we can expand our capacity for compassion and maintain resilience in the face of challenges.

In Peace is Every Step, Nhất Hạnh states "when another person makes you suffer, it is because he suffers deeply within himself, and his suffering is spilling over. He does not need punishment; he needs help." Plum Village views compassion as the most effective form of protection. Everyone has faced hardship in some form, as society is filled with discrimination, violence, and greed. We all carry seeds of suffering within us, but by transforming ourselves, we can help change those we see as oppressors. In his teachings, Thich Nhat Hanh recalled a young, pale French soldier demanding rice during the First Indochina War. Forced to comply, he felt anger but later reflected on the soldier’s suffering—far from home, caught in a brutal war. He realized that both Vietnamese and French soldiers were victims. Through understanding and compassion, we free ourselves and can help others do the same, even those who have caused us harm. The best way to protect ourselves is using skillful means to reduce harms by practicing compassion for ourselves and by practicing compassion for others.

=== Environmentalism and Mindfulness ===
In 1970, alongside Alfred Hassler from the Fellowship of Reconciliation and other prominent intellectuals and scientists, Nhat Hanh and Chan Khong played a key role in organizing Europe’s first environmental conference in Menton, France. From there, Plum Village continued focusing on environmental issues based in Buddhist teachings. Plum Village’s environmental teachings draw heavily from the Diamond Sutra, a text noted for dispelling illusions and, per Nhất Hanh, supporting deep ecology. Per Plum Village our perceptions are often shaped by language, culture, and a tendency to categorize reality into neat boxes that rarely fit. Buddhism distinguishes between “conventional truth”—the labels and appearances we rely on—and “ultimate truth,” the deeper, interconnected reality. The Diamond Sutra is said to guide us to experience this deeper truth by revealing interbeing. With the insight of interbeing, we come to understand that we are neither isolated nor powerless but every action we take has significance In this sutra, practitioners are encouraged to abandon four central ideas including the fixed notion of “self,” the idea of a separate “human being,” the division between living and nonliving entities, and the concept of a defined “life span”, in order to perceive our true nature and the genuine character of reality. Escaping these notions allows one to become bodhisattva dedicated to easing suffering in the world and is supported by saying the five remembrances.

Nhất Hanh states that If you cling to the belief that you possess an isolated self, distinct from your ancestry and the cosmos, this view is mistaken. Although there is an individual “you,” it is formed from components that extend beyond what we typically label as “self.” Instead of viewing your body as a fixed entity that defines you, observe it as a continuous flow—a stream that carries the influence of your human, animal, plant, and mineral ancestors. A more fitting expression is “I inter-am,” which better reflects our interconnected nature.

Nhất Hanh addressing the second point stating we tend to pursue safety, prosperity, and happiness exclusively for humans, often at the cost of other life forms. Yet, when we scrutinize our composition, we see that we are built from elements common to all living and nonliving elements. Even as human beings, we exist within interbeing which Nhất Hanh states is the basis of deep ecology.

Nhất Hanh continues stating many people mistakenly divide the world into sentient or “animate” beings and non-sentient or “inanimate” matter. However, evolutionary science reveals that our lineage includes not only human and animal ancestors but even mineral ones. For example, a kernel of corn, when planted, demonstrates its own intrinsic way of “knowing” how to sprout and develop into a fully formed plant. Thus, what we often deem inanimate is, in fact, not so inanimate but very alive.

Nhất Hanh concludes addressing the fourth central idea stating we typically think our existence is confined between birth and death. Yet, Plum Village teaches that life and death are continuous transformations rather than clear beginnings or endings. Observation shows that nothing ever truly disappears but it merely changes form. We existed before our birth and continue in some form after death. Our ancestors, teachers, and the inherent Buddha nature within us all contribute to a continuum that transcends individual lifetimes, reminding us that the effort to care for the planet extends far beyond our own existence.

In light of the teachings, Plum Village teaches that we can and should have a significant impact on the environment. In Buddhism, there is no divine plan for saving the planet but instead, there is a dynamic force (karma, the energy of action) that shapes the world. Nhất Hanh proposes that the action dimension is the realm of a bodhisattvas. One must reject the dualistic view that humans are at the center and we should only protect the earth so that humans can survive. While all things, including human civilization, are impermanent we can liberate ourselves from fear by accepting this. But humans also need not despair as, with insight, one can learn that the Earth’s future relies on our mindful actions including mindful consumption and simple living and we can make real progress in protecting the earth. While we must first cultivate mindfulness in ourselves, this is not enough but we need a collective awakening to truly protect the earth. Efforts can benefit all living beings on Earth and, ultimately, on other planets and through time as an expression of love for future generations and all beings.

== Texts and Dharma transmission ==
Core texts that influenced the tradition include The Anapanasati Sutra (Discourse on the Full Awareness of Breathing) and The Satipatthana Sutra (Discourse on the Four Establishments of Mindfulness). The tradition has produced texts including the books written by Thích Nhất Hạnh and Chân Không, through the practice of providing dharma talks and dharma education. The tradition practices Dharma transmission through a dharma lamp transmission. Nhat Hanh states the goal of transmission is "go with the sangha as a river, and not as a separate drop of water." as the sangha is meant to establish practice centers and teach the dharma as an endless stream. The practice follows the bodhisattva path, "I will not decline any work that will bring benefits to all people" manifesting in different bodies and different worlds to spread the dharma, bringing light to hungry ghosts, and helping all sentient and non-sentient beings escape attachment and achieve enlightenment.

Nhất Hạnh completed a new English translation of the Heart Sutra in addition to more than one hundred books on mindfulness, meditation, interbeing, the life of the Buddha, ethics, Buddhist psychology, interreligious discourse, and Buddhist philosophy from the Plum Village tradition perspective. Notable books on include work on mindfulness including The Miracle of Mindfulness, and Peace is Every Step, a biography of the Buddha Drawn directly from Pali, Sanskrit, and Chinese sources known as Old Path White Clouds, introductions to Buddhism such as The Heart of the Buddha's Teachings and Awakening of the Heart, work on ecology notably Zen and the Art of Saving the Planet, interfaith dialogue notably Living Buddha Living Christ, poetry notably Call Me by My True Names, and books on ethics or practical life matters including How to Love, and No Mud No Lotus.

Nhất Hạnh sold more than five million books in English, French, and Vietnamese, with translations into 30 other languages. The Miracle of Mindfulness was originally titled The Miracle of Being Awake. In 1975, 'mindfulness' was barely recognized in English until Nhất Hạnh's work popularized the concept.

=== Online Presence ===
Plum Village maintains a significant online presence to spread information on the sangha and offers the possibility of participating in specific activities through an online lay sangha, online retreats, video teachings, social media presence, practice manuals, The Way Out is In podcast, publishing arm via ParallaxPress, a newsletter, an app called Plum Village offering meditations, dharma talks, and online mindfulness exercises. The significant communications apparatus has been noted for solidifying its place in France and its influence worldwide.

== Plum Village locations ==
=== Background ===
Early in his time in France, Thích Nhất Hạnh established a center in Troyes to support refugees and boat people. However, the centre soon became overwhelmed by the growing number of people it served, prompting him to seek a larger location for the community. In 1982, amidst rural depopulation, the community acquired old farm buildings in France's Dordogne and Lot-et-Garonne regions. Initially spanning 29 hectares, Plum Village has since expanded to over 80 hectares across three main hamlets: the Lower Hamlet in Loubès-Bernac (Lot-et-Garonne), the Upper Hamlet in Thénac (Dordogne), and the New Hamlet in Dieulivol (Gironde). Community members and nearby municipalities provided support for the development providing material support in an effort to support refugees however many neighborhoods were still concerned about the monastery's presence . Plum Village made efforts to integrate into French society through open houses, cooking for and dining with neighbors, providing French classes, complying with building codes, marking western holidays like Christmas, and working to support the local economies of nearby towns and villages leading to large-scale local acceptance of the monastery.

=== Membership ===
The Plum Village tradition includes more than 500 monastics across 9 monasteries and more than 1,000 lay sangha communities worldwide. An important component of this tradition is the Order of Interbeing, which is a social network of monastics and lay people who have undertaken the Fourteen Mindfulness Trainings. There is also a community inspired by this tradition, aimed at young people between the ages of 18 and 35, called Wake Up. Other initiatives include Wake Up Schools and the Earth Holder Sangha.

=== Monasteries ===
As of November 2018, there are 11 monasteries and practice centers in the Plum Village Tradition. The tradition also operates three small farms.

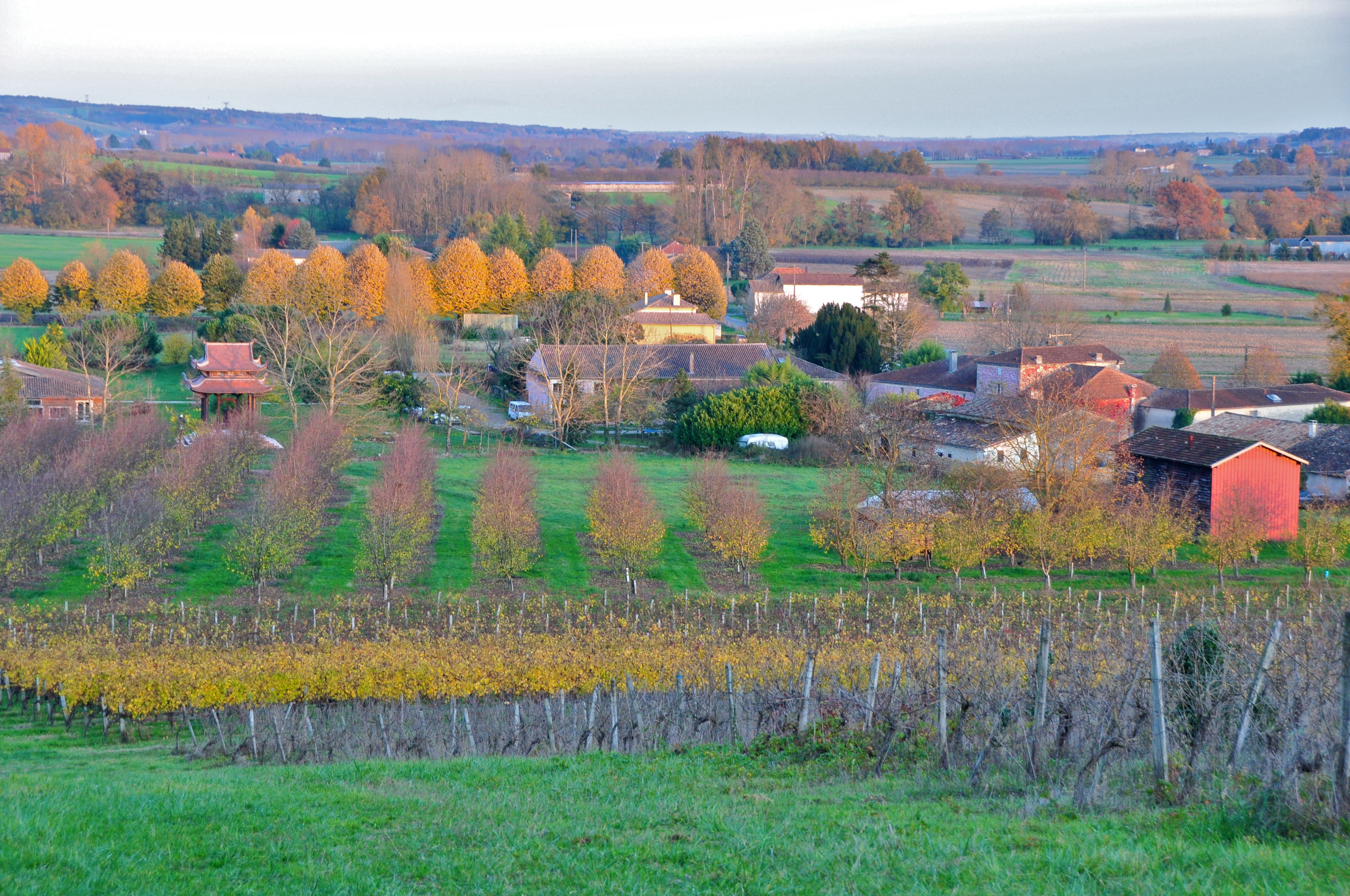
New Hamlet - Plum Village France

Europe

- Plum Village Monastery (Le Village des Pruniers), France
- Healing Spring Monastery (Monastère de la Source Guérissante), France
- Maison de L'Inspir, France
- European Institute of Applied Buddhism, Germany

Asia

- Thai Plum Village, Thailand
- Asian Institute of Applied Buddhism, Hong Kong

Oceania

- Mountain Spring Monastery, near Sydney, Australia
- Stream Entering Meditation Center, near Melbourne, Australia

United States

- Deer Park Monastery, California
- Magnolia Grove Monastery, Mississippi
- Blue Cliff Monastery, New York

== Culture and Influence ==
Plum Village is the center of the film Walk with Me focuses on the Plum Village monastics' daily life and rites filmed over three years. Nhat Hanh and Plum Village teachings were influential in author and activist bell hooks' work including the book all about love. Christiana Figueres who led the Paris Agreement concerning climate change cites Nhat Hanh as influencing her work, environmental outlook, and as a support during the talks.

== See also ==
- B. R. Ambedkar
- Navayana
- Buddhist Peace Fellowship
- Hsing Yun
- Thomas Merton
- Opposition to United States involvement in the Vietnam War
- Buddhism in France
- Religion in Vietnam
- Religion and environmentalism
- European Buddhist Union
- Fo Guang Shan
- Overseas Vietnamese
