= Thénac =

Thénac may refer to the following places in France:

- Thénac, Charente-Maritime, a commune of the Charente-Maritime département
- Thénac, Dordogne, a commune of the Dordogne département
