= Nhất Chi Mai =

Vietnamese Buddhist nun (1934–1967)

Nhat Chi Mai

Nhất Chi Mai (February 20, 1934 – May 16, 1967), born Phan Thị Mai and legally named Thích nữ Diệu Huỳnh, was a Buddhist nun who killed herself in an act of self-immolation in Saigon on May 16, 1967, in protest against the Vietnam War.

== Early life ==
Nhat was born on February 20, 1934, in the Thai Hiep Thanh commune in the province of Tay Ninh. In 1956 she graduated from the National Teacher's School. In 1964 she graduated from the University of Saigon Faculty of Letters, and in 1966 she graduated from the Van Hanh Buddhist University.

== Career ==
She became an elementary school teacher at Tan Dinh in Saigon after graduation. While in Saigon, she actively participated in the group "Youth Serving Society" and taught within various orphanages. During this time she was a student of Thich Nhat Hanh and was deeply influenced by his vision of Engaged Buddhism.

Along with Sister Chan Khong she was one of the first six lay people ordained in Nhat Hanh's Buddhist order, the Order of Interbeing in February 1966.

== Self-immolation ==
On May 16, 1967, at 7:20 a.m., in District 10 of Saigon/Ho Chi Minh City in front of the Tu Nghiem Pagoda, Nhat Chi Mai set herself on fire using a petrol accelerant. She was 33 years old when she died from her burns. Prior to her self-immolation she wrote ten messages outlining her anti-war beliefs and calling for an end to the Vietnam War.

== See also ==
- Chân Không
- Vietnam War
- List of political self-immolations
