= Chân Không =

Vietnamese Buddhist nun

Thích Chân Không
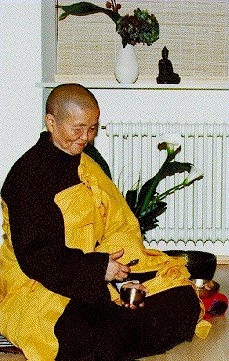
- Title: Zen master

Personal life
- Born: Cao Ngọc Phương; 1938 (age 87–88) Bến Tre, Cochinchina, French Indochina

Religious life
- Religion: Buddhism
- School: Lâm Tế Dhyana

Senior posting
- Teacher: Thích Nhất Hạnh
- Based in: Plum Village Monastery (Lang Mai)

Chân Không (born Cao Ngọc Phương, 1938) is an expatriate Vietnamese Bhikkhunī (nun) and peace activist who has worked closely with Thích Nhất Hạnh in starting the Plum Village Tradition and helping conduct spiritual retreats internationally.

== Early life ==
Chân Không was born Cao Ngọc Phương in 1938 in Bến Tre, French Indochina in the center of the Mekong Delta. As the eighth of nine children in a middle-class family, her father taught her and her siblings the value of work and humility. She quotes her father as saying: "...never bargain with a poor farmer because for you a few dong may not be much, but for him it is enough to support his children."

== Education ==
In 1958 she enrolled in the University of Saigon to study biology. She was also involved in political action, becoming the student leader at the University, spending much of her time helping the poor and sick in the slums of the city.

== School of Youth and Social Service ==
Chân Không was central in the foundation and many of the activities of the School of Youth and Social Service (SYSS) which organized medical, educational and agricultural facilities in rural Vietnam during the war. At one stage the SYSS involved over 10,000 young peace workers who rebuilt many villages ravaged by the fighting. When Thích Nhất Hạnh returned to the United States, Chân Không ran the day-to-day operations.

== Order of Interbeing ==
On 5 February 1966 Chân Không was ordained as one of the first six members of the Order of Interbeing, sometimes called the "Six Cedars". Following her ordination, she was given the name Sister Chân Không, True Emptiness. In explaining the meaning of the name, she says: "In Buddhism, the word 'emptiness' is a translation of the Sanskrit sunyata. It means 'empty of a separate self.' It is not a negative or despairing term. It is a celebration of interconnectedness, of interbeing. It means nothing can exist by itself alone, that everything is inextricably interconnected with everything else. I know that I must always work to remember that I am empty of a separate self and full of the many wonders of this universe, including the generosity of my grandparents and parents, the many friends and teachers who have helped and supported me along the path, and you dear readers, without whom this book could not exist. We inter-are, and therefore we are empty of an identity that is separate from our interconnectedness."

The Order of Interbeing was to be composed of monks, nuns, laymen, and laywomen. The first six ordainees were free to choose whether they preferred to live and practice as formal monastics or as laypersons. The first three women chose to live celibate lives like nuns, although they didn't shave their heads, while the three men chose to marry and practice as lay Buddhists. Among the three women was Nhat Chi Mai, known for her active participation in the group "Youth Serving Society" who taught within various orphanages and immolated herself in 1967 for peace.

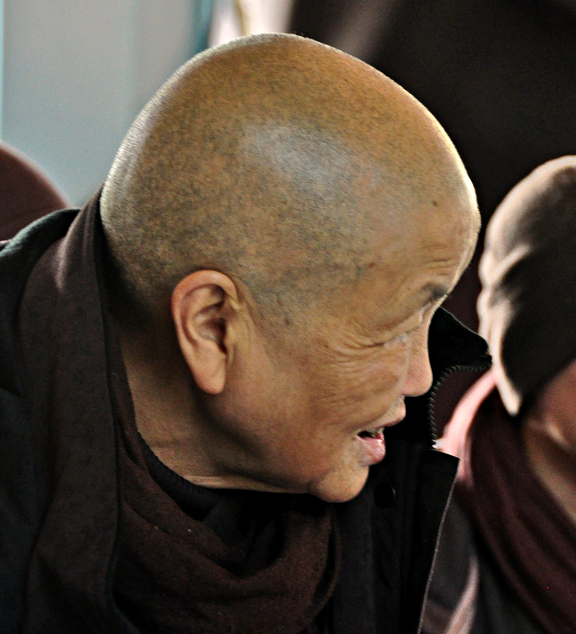
Chân Không at Plum Village Monastery, 2009

From 1969 to 1972 Chân Không worked with Thích Nhất Hạnh in Paris organizing the Buddhist Peace Delegation which campaigned for peace in Vietnam. She then worked with Thích Nhất Hạnh to establish the first the Sweet Potato community near Paris, then Plum Village Monastery in 1982. Chân Không accompanied and assisted Thích Nhất Hạnh when he traveled. In addition, she has organized relief work for those in need in Vietnam, by coordinating relief food parcels for poor children and medicine for the sick, and has helped organize activities at Plum Village.

Sister Chân Không ordained as a nun by Thích Nhất Hạnh in 1988 on Vulture Peak, India.

During the three-month return to Vietnam (January to early April 2005), Thích Nhất Hạnh spoke to thousands of people throughout the country - bureaucrats, politicians, intellectuals, street vendors, taxi drivers, artists. In addition to Thich Thích Nhất Hạnh's Dharma talks, Sister Chân Không also taught and conducted additional mindfulness practices. She led the crowds in singing Plum Village songs, chanting, and leading "total relaxation" sessions. Other times, it was her simple application of Vietnamese heritage to modern ways of life that appealed to the people they met. During Tết (Vietnamese New Year) celebrations in February, she performed an "oracle reading" for hundreds of Buddhist followers.

== Declaration of Religious Leaders Against Modern Slavery ==
In 2014, for the first time in history major Anglican, Catholic, and Orthodox Christian leaders, as well as Jewish, Muslim, Hindu, and Buddhist leaders (including Chân Không, representing Thích Nhất Hạnh), met to sign a shared commitment against modern-day slavery; the declaration they signed calls for the elimination of slavery and human trafficking by 2020.

== Autobiography ==
Chân Không wrote her autobiography, Learning True Love: How I Learned & Practiced Social Change in Vietnam in 1993.

== Bibliography ==
- Learning True Love: How I Learned & Practiced Social Change in Vietnam, 1993, Parallax Press, Berkeley, CA, ISBN 0-938077-50-3.
- Be Free Where You Are, Thích Nhất Hạnh, foreword by Chân Không, Parallax Press, 2005, ISBN 1-888375-23-X.
- Drops of Emptiness, Thích Nhất Hạnh and Chân Không, Sounds True Direct, 1998, ASIN B00000379W.
- The Present Moment: A Retreat on the Practice of Mindfulness, Thích Nhất Hạnh and Chân Không, Sounds True, 1994, ISBN 1-56455-262-4.
- Touching the Earth: The Five Prostrations and Deep Relaxation, Thích Nhất Hạnh and Chân Không, Sounds True, 1997, ISBN 1-56455-278-0
- Beginning Anew: Four Steps to Renewing Communication, Chân Không, introduction by Thích Nhất Hạnh, Parallax Press, 2014, ISBN 9781937006815

== See also ==
- Buddhism in America
- Buddhism in France
- Buddhism in Vietnam
- ONE: The Movie
- Women in Buddhism
