= Blue Cliff Monastery =

Zen Buddhist monastery in Pine Bush, New York

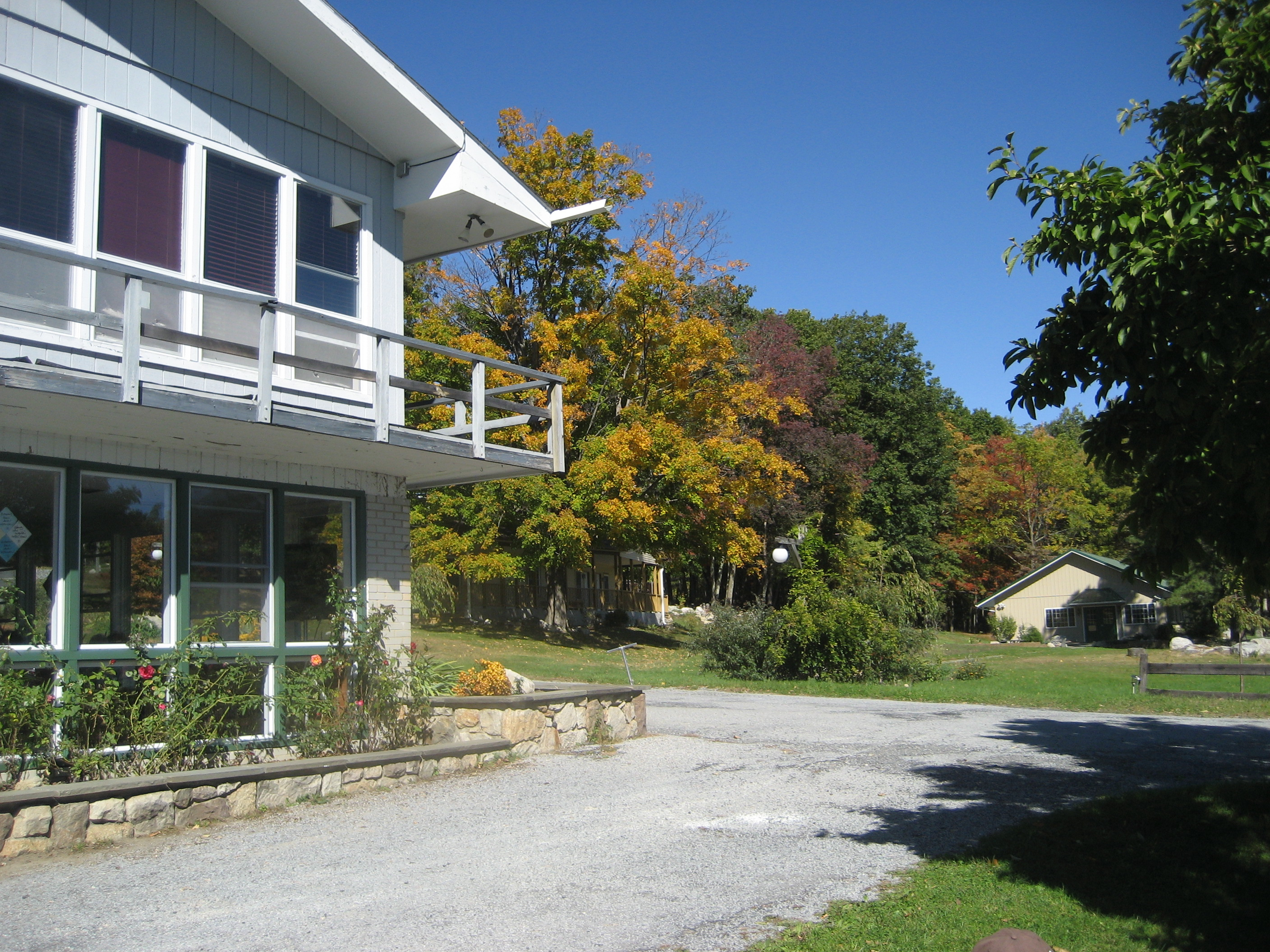
- Dining Hall and Meditation Hall

Religion
- Affiliation: Order of Interbeing; Lâm Tế Dhyana

Location
- Location: 3 Mindfulness Way; Pine Bush, NY 12566
- Country: United States
- Interactive map of Blue Cliff Monastery
- Coordinates: 41.637797°N 74.397121°W

Architecture
- Founder: Thich Nhat Hanh
- Completed: 2007

Website
- BlueCliffMonastery.org

Blue Cliff Monastery is an 80-acre (0.32 km^{2}) Thiền Buddhist monastery located in Pine Bush, New York. It was founded in May 2007 by monastic and lay practitioners from the Plum Village Tradition.

The monastery is under the direction of Thích Nhất Hạnh's Order of Interbeing in the Thiền tradition. Blue Cliff Monastery follows the same practices and daily schedules as its root monastery Plum Village and its sister monasteries Deer Park Monastery in Escondido, California, and Magnolia Grove Monastery in Batesville, Mississippi.

Blue Cliff Monastery was created when the monastics moved from Maple Forest Monastery and the Green Mountain Dharma Center. In 1997 Maple Forest Monastery was founded in Woodstock, Vermont, and a year later Green Mountain Dharma Center was founded in Hartland, Vermont. Maple Forest was the monks' residence and Green Mountain was the nuns' residence. In May 2007 both centers moved to Blue Cliff Monastery.

The Monastery is located in the Hudson Valley of New York (one hour and 30 minutes from NYC). Inside the property are two ponds and one creek. 65 of its 80 acres are forest. Visitors are welcome to practice mindfulness with the multifold community of monks, nuns and laypeople. Typically, days of mindfulness are held twice a week (Thursdays and Sundays). Retreats are held frequently throughout the year.

== Gallery ==
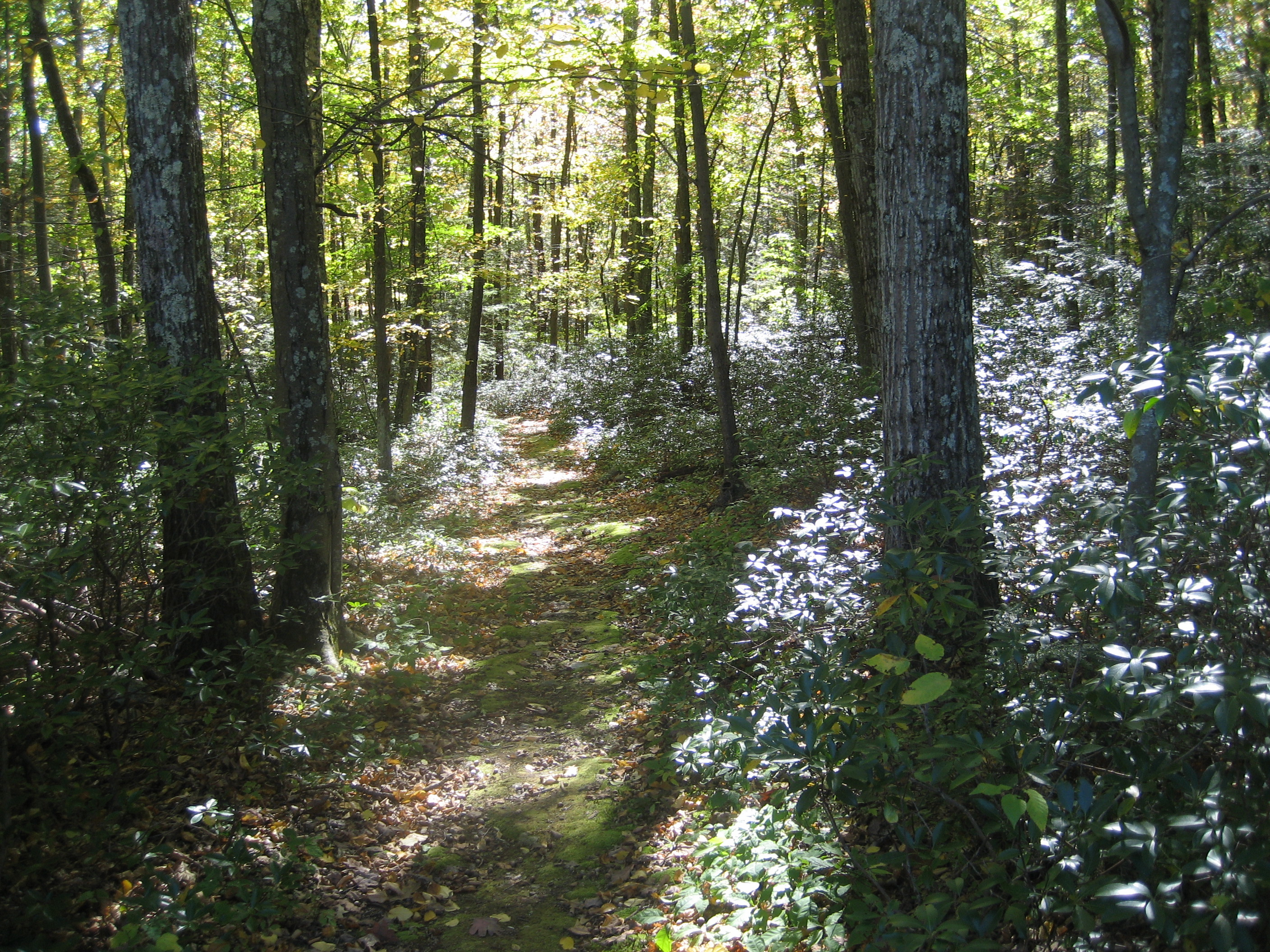

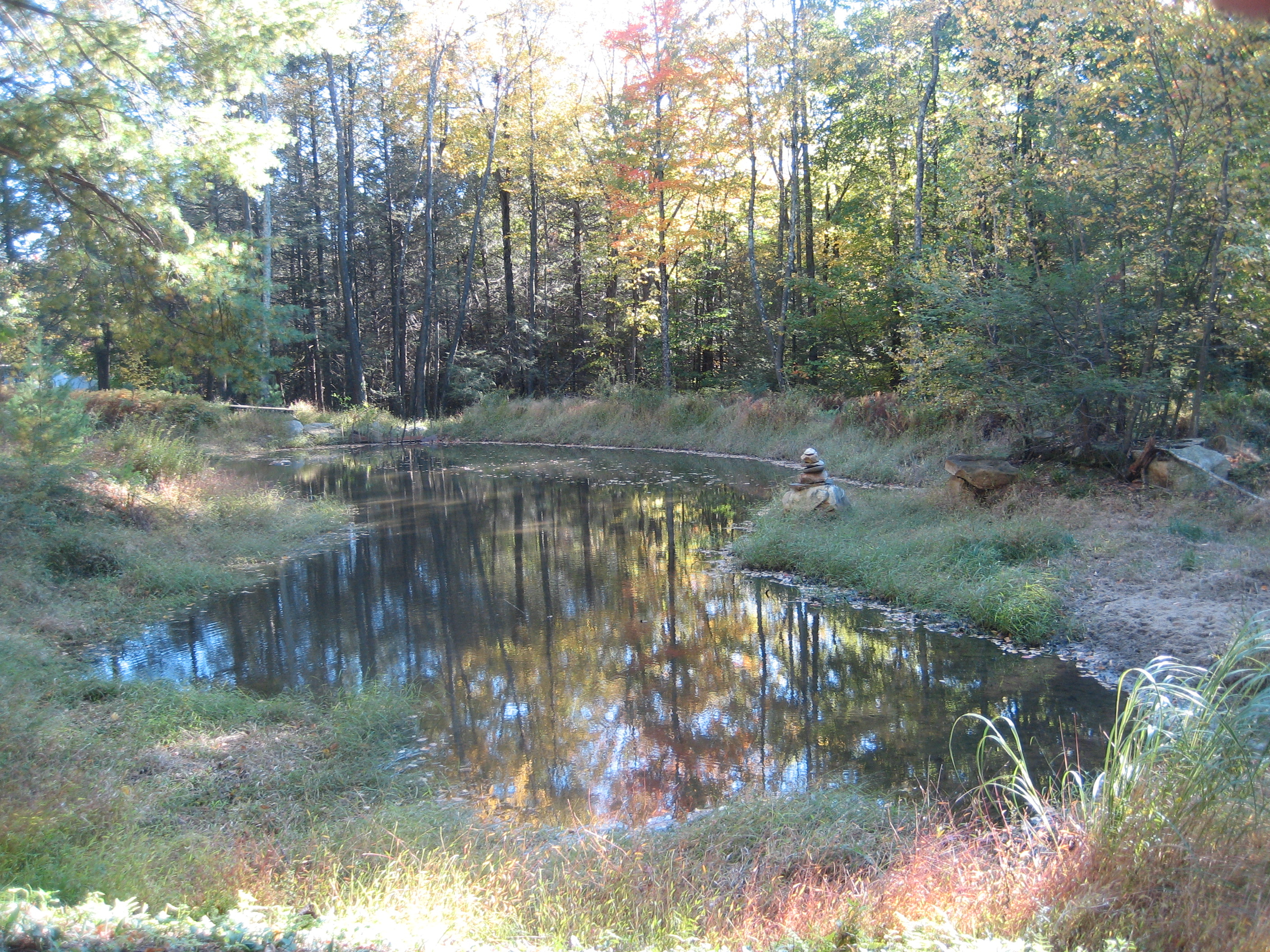

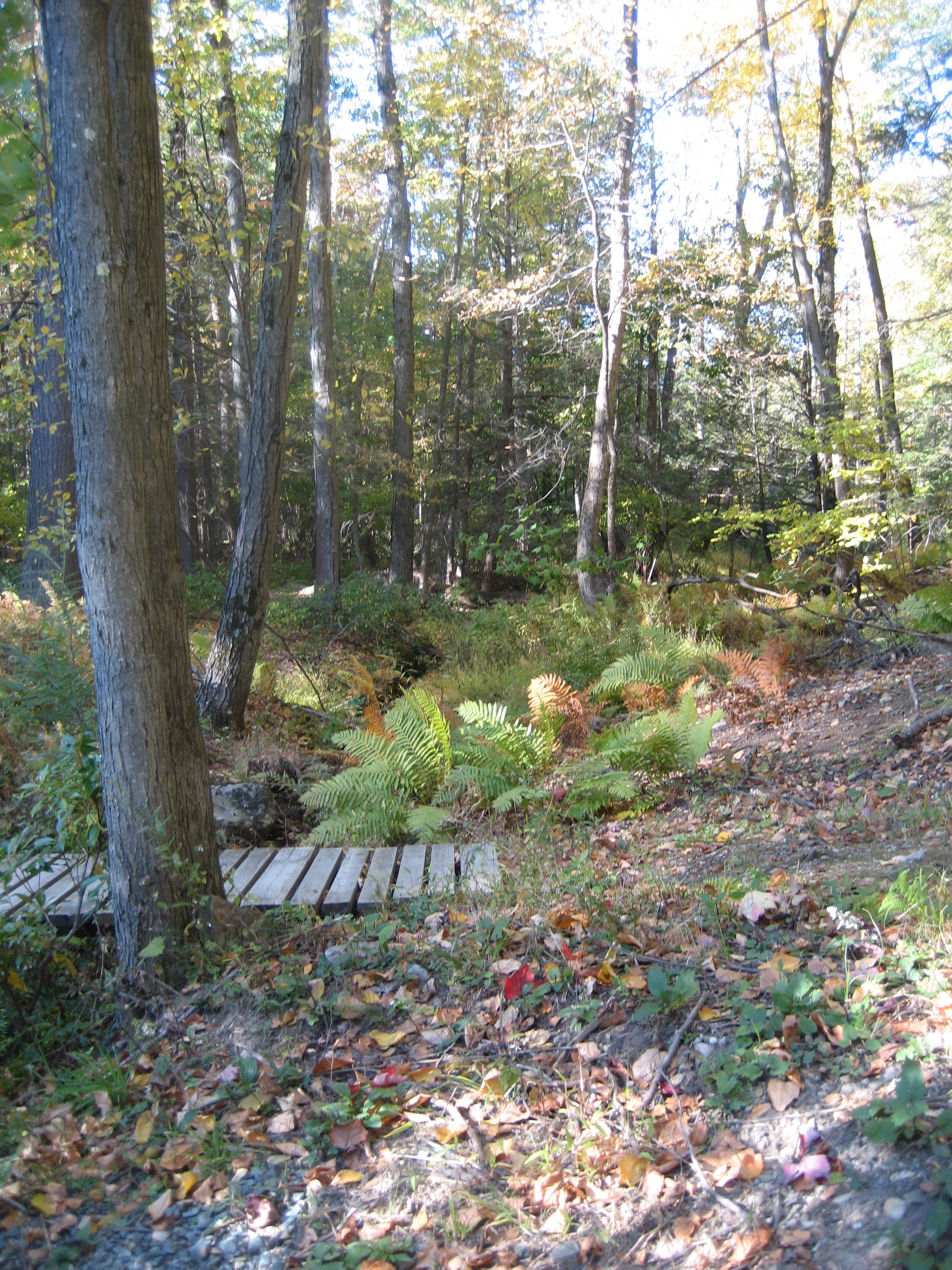

== See also ==
- Buddhism in the United States
- Buddhist monasticism
- List of Buddhist temples
- Timeline of Zen Buddhism in the United States
- Plum Village Monastery
