= Order of Interbeing =

Buddhist community founded by Thích Nhất Hạnh

The Order of Interbeing (Vietnamese: Tiếp Hiện or Tiep Hien; French: Ordre de l'Interêtre) is an international Buddhist community of monks, nuns, and laypeople in the Plum Village Tradition founded between 1964 and 1966 by Vietnamese Buddhist monk Thích Nhất Hạnh.

Initially, Nhất Hạnh established the Order of Interbeing from a selection of six board members of the School for Youth and Social Services—three men and three women. The first members were ordained in February 1966 and vowed to study and practice the Fourteen Precepts of Engaged Buddhism. In 1981, Nguyễn Anh Hùng, a microbiologist and lay meditation teacher, became the seventh member of the Order. As of 2020, the Order of Interbeing had more than one thousand core members.

Tiếp Hiện (接現) is a Sino-Vietnamese term. The term predated the Order of Interbeing's use in other contexts in Vietnamese but was and remains uncommon. Tiếp means "being in touch with" and "continuing." Hiện means "realizing" and "making it here and now." The translation "Interbeing" (French: Interêtre) is a word coined by Nhất Hạnh to represent the Buddhist principles of anatta, pratītyasamutpāda, and the Madhyamaka understanding of śūnyatā. The order contains members of the "Fourfold Sangha" (male and female monastics and male and female laypersons) and is guided by the Fourteen Mindfulness Trainings.

== Timeline ==
1926

- October 11 - Birth of Thich Nhat Hanh (birth name: Nguyễn Xuân Bảo) in Thừa Thiên, Vietnam)

1938

- Birth of Chân Không (born Cao Ngoc Phuong in Bến Tre, Vietnam)

1942

- Thầy Thich Nhat Hanh entered Từ Hiếu Temple as a śrāmaṇera

194_

- Thầy Thich Nhat Hanh graduates from Báo Quốc Pagoda Buddhist Academy

1949

- Thầy Thich Nhat Hanh is ordained a Buddhist monk

1950

- Thầy Thich Nhat Hanh co-founded An Quang Temple in Saigon, Vietnam

195_

- Thầy Thich Nhat Hanh Founded the Phuong Boi (Fragrant Palm Leaves) Meditation Center in the highlands of Vietnam

1956

- Thầy Thich Nhat Hanh named Editor-in-Chief of “Vietnamese Buddhism” the periodical of the Unified Vietnam Buddhist Association

1958

- Chân Không enrolled at the University of Saigon, studying biology

1960

- Thầy Thich Nhat Hanh goes to the United States to study comparative religion at Columbia University and Princeton University

1961

- Thầy Thich Nhat Hanh Teaches at Columbia University and Princeton University

1963

- Thầy Thich Nhat Hanh returns to Vietnam
- Sister Chân Không goes to Paris, France to complete her degree in biology

1964

- Thầy Thich Nhat Hanh establishes Vạn Hạnh Zen Temple, La Boi Book Publisher and the School for Youth and Social Service (SYSS)
- Chân Không returns to Vietnam to work with the SYSS
- The Order of Interbeing is established

1965

- Thầy Thich Nhat Hanh writes “In Search of the Enemy of Man” a letter to Martin Luther King Jr. urging him to publicly oppose the Vietnam War

1966

- February 5 – the first members - the "Six Cedars" - are ordained into the Order of Interbeing. Among the six are Chân Không and Nhat Chi Mai. The latter would immolate herself in protest against the war a year later.
- May 1 - TNH is given the Lamp Transmission at Từ Hiếu Temple from Master Chân Thật, making him a Dharmacharya (Dharma Teacher)
- Thầy Thich Nhat Hanh returns to the US to lead a symposium at Cornell University
- Thầy Thich Nhat Hanh speaks to many groups and leaders, including Robert McNamara and Martin Luther King, Jr. urging peace in Vietnam
- Sister Chân Không is named operations director of the SYSS
- Control of Van Hanh University is taken over by the Vice Chancellor who severs ties with the SYSS, calling Sister Chân Không a communist
- The SYSS continues to work despite the harassment and murder of many of its members

1967

- Thầy Thich Nhat Hanh is nominated for the Nobel Peace Prize by Martin Luther King Jr.
- Thầy Thich Nhat Hanh is exiled from Vietnam by the Vietnamese government
- Thầy Thich Nhat Hanh gains right of asylum in France
- May – Nhat Chi Mai, one of the "Six Cedars", immolates herself for peace

1969

- Thầy Thich Nhat Hanh Leads the Buddhist Peace Delegation
- Sister Chân Không joins TNH in France to assist with the Buddhist Peace Delegation; she is considered an enemy of the Vietnamese government and exiled as well
- Thầy Thich Nhat Hanh Establishes the Unified Buddhist Church in France
- Thầy Thich Nhat Hanh lectures at the Sorbonne in Paris

1973

- Paris Peace Accords are signed. Thầy Thich Nhat Hanh is not allowed re-entry into Vietnam by the newly formed communist government.

1975

- Thầy Thich Nhat Hanh and Chân Không form the Sweet Potatoes Meditation Center in France

1976-77

- Thầy Thich Nhat Hanh and Chân Không lead efforts to rescue Vietnamese boat people

1982

- Plum Village Monastery in Dordogne, France is established by Thầy Thich Nhat Hanh and Chân Không

1987

- Thầy Thich Nhat Hanh ordains the first North American members of the Order of Interbeing at Camp les Sommets Camp (Eastern Townships, Quebec, Canada)

1988

- Chân Không is ordained by Thầy Thich Nhat Hanh as a nun on Vulture’s Peak in India

1990

- Annabel Laity (True Virtue) ordained as a Dharmacharya and serves as Director of Practice at Plum Village

1992

- The first conference of the International Order of Interbeing is held. This conference established the Order of Interbeing Charter, elected an Executive Council, and established that Assembly meetings would be held regularly to revise and amend the Charter. It also established a Council of Elders and a Council of Youth to draw from the experience of its members for leadership and guidance.

1997

- Maple Forest Monastery was formed in Vermont

1998

- Unified Buddhist Church is formed in the United States
- Annabel Laity named to head the UBC, Inc
- Green Mountain Dharma Center formed
- Annabel Laity named Abbess of the Maple Forest Monastery and Green Mountain Dharma Center

2000

- June - Thầy Thich Nhat Hanh assists in writing the Manifesto 2000 which consists of six pledges to promote a culture of peace and non-violence in the world. It has been signed by the Nobel Peace Prize Laureates
- Deer Park Monastery is formed in California near Escondido

2001

- September 21 – Thầy Thich Nhat Hanh begins a fast for peace and to remember those who have died in the September 11 attacks
- September 25 - Thầy Thich Nhat Hanh gives a speech at the Riverside Church in New York City urging the American people and government to think before reacting to the events of September 11 and to look for a peaceful resolution.

2003

- September - Thầy Thich Nhat Hanh gives a talk at the Library of Congress.

2005

- January 12 to April 11 - Thầy Thich Nhat Hanh returns to Vietnam to visit Buddhist temples, teach, and is allowed to publish a limited number of his books in Vietnamese; 100 monastic and 90 lay members of the OI accompany him
- Two temples are re-established in Vietnam with TNH as their spiritual head: the Tu Hieu Temple and the Prajña Temple
- August - Magnolia Grove Monastery is accepted by Thầy Thich Nhat Hanh as an Order of Interbeing center in Mississippi
- October 9, Thầy Thich Nhat Hanh and Order of Interbeing members lead the “Peace is Every Step” walk at MacArthur Park in Los Angeles, California.

2006

- May 22 - Thầy Thich Nhat Hanh's book Old Path White Clouds is optioned for the film Buddha to be produced by MCorpGlobal. TNH makes an appearance at the Canne's film festival to promote the project
- September 11 - Thầy Thich Nhat Hanh makes an appearance in Los Angeles to promote the Buddha film project. The Dalai Lama endorsed the project at the luncheon which was attended by a number of Hollywood actors.
- October 7 - Thầy Thich Nhat Hanh addresses UNESCO, calling for specific steps to reverse the cycle of violence, war, and global warming. He calls for a commitment of observing a weekly No Car Day to be promoted globally.
- October 11 - Thầy Thich Nhat Hanh enjoys his 80th birthday

2007

- February 20 to May 9 - Thầy Thich Nhat Hanh Returns to Vietnam to conduct "Grand Requiem For Praying" ceremonies to help heal the wounds of the Vietnam war.
- May 20 to May 31 - Thầy Thich Nhat Hanh visits Thailand, giving Dharma talks and a 5-day retreat.
- May - Blue Cliff Monastery established; Maple Forest Monastery and Green Mountain Dharma Center close and move to the new location as an extension of Plum Village Monastery

2008

- August - European Institute of Applied Buddhism is established Waldbröl, Germany, by members of the Plum Village Tradition and the Order of Interbeing.

2010

- June - Asian Institute of Applied Buddhism is established in Hong Kong.
- November - Thầy Thich Nhat Hanh gives a 3-day retreat in Hong Kong.

2013

- May - Thầy Thich Nhat Hanh visits Hong Kong and gives a four-day retreat, culminating in a talk at the Hong Kong Colosseum.
- September - Thầy Thich Nhat Hanh gives a talk at Google HQ in California.

2014

- March - The University of Hong Kong awards Thầy Thich Nhat Hanh an Honorary Doctorate in recognition of his contribution to world peace and humanity.

2015

- October - Thầy Thich Nhat Hanh is awarded the Pacem in Terris Peace and Freedom Award, a Catholic peace award.

2022

- January 22 - Repose of Thầy Thich Nhat Hanh at the age of 95 in his residence in Từ Hiếu Temple in Huế, Vietnam.
