= Plum Village Monastery =

Buddhist monastery founded in France 1982

Coordinates: 44°44′37″N 0°20′36″E

Plum Village
- Làng Mai
- Interactive map of Plum Village

Monastery information
- Order: Zen
- Established: 1982

People
- Founders: Thích Nhất Hạnh, Chân Không

Site
- Location: Thénac, Dordogne, France
- Website: plumvillage.org

The Plum Village Monastery (Vietnamese: Làng Mai; French: Village des pruniers) is a Buddhist monastery of the Plum Village Tradition in the Dordogne, southern France near the city of Bordeaux. It was founded by two Vietnamese monastics, Thích Nhất Hạnh (a Zen master and Buddhist monk) and Chân Không (a Buddhist nun), in 1982.

== History ==
After being refused the right to return to Vietnam due to the Vietnam War, Thích Nhất Hạnh formed a small mindfulness community 100 miles southeast of Paris at the village of Fontvannes called "the Sweet Potato" after the food that poor Vietnamese people eat. Following Thích Nhất Hạnh's expulsion from Singapore following illegal attempts to rescue Vietnamese boat people, he settled in France and began to lead mindfulness retreats.

In 1981, the Sweet Potato community held its first summer retreat, which attracted more people than it could accommodate. Thích Nhất Hạnh then traveled south with Chân Không to find a larger site. They found a piece of land in Thénac, Dordogne, which seemed ideal. The landowner, Mr. Dézon, didn't want to sell, so they continued looking. A few days later, on September 28, 1982, Thích Nhất Hạnh purchased a tract of land about 6 kilometres (3.7 mi) away, which is now known as the Lower Hamlet (Vietnamese: Xóm Hạ). Later that year, a hailstorm destroyed the vineyards on Mr. Dézon's property and he was forced to put his land on the market. Nhất Hạnh bought the land and called it Upper Hamlet (Vietnamese: Xóm Thượng). Initially, these two hamlets were named Persimmon Village (Vietnamese: Làng Hồng), but it soon became clear that plums fared much better on the rocky soil, so it became Plum Village (Vietnamese: Làng Mai).

Each year the community hosts a four-week Summer Opening retreat, which has grown increasingly popular in recent years. Attendance has grown from 232 people in total in 1983 to over 800 guests at a time in 2015. In addition, the community hosts a variety of retreats year round, such as the Wake Up Retreat for young adults, the 21-Day Retreat for more experienced laypeople, and the 90-day Winter (Rains) Retreat.

== Practice ==
Aside from practicing Zen Buddhism, The Plum Village practices Engaged Buddhism, an application of buddhist teaching to the current world to help solve social problems.

The following is the schedule for an average day at Plum Village (Làng Mai):

- 5:00 am: Rise
- 6:00 am: Sitting and walking meditation
- 7:00 am: Breakfast
- 9:00 am: Dharma Talk / Class / Presentation / Mindful work period
- 11:30 am: Walking meditation
- 12:30 pm: Lunch
- 1:30 pm: Rest
- 3:00 pm: Service (working) meditation
- 6:00 pm: Optional dinner
- 8:00 pm: Personal study, Happiness Meeting, Beginning Anew
- 9:30 pm: Noble silence begins
- 10:00 pm: Lights out

Throughout the day, visitors and members of the Plum Village hear the sound of a gong ring through the Upper Hamlet. When this happens all members are expected to cease what they are doing and pause for a moment of mindful silence

== Hamlets ==
Today, Plum Village is made up of four major residential hamlets. Upper Hamlet houses approximately 65 monks and laymen. Lower Hamlet houses over 40 nuns and laywomen. Son Ha Temple houses approximately 20 monks and the New Hamlet, 20 minutes away by bus, houses approximately 40 nuns and laywomen.

There are two additional hamlets that open up during the Summer Opening retreat, which are open for all guests.

Plum Village has one sister monastery in Europe, the European Institute of Applied Buddhism (EIAB) in Waldbröl, Germany, and three in the United States: Blue Cliff Monastery in Pine Bush, New York, Deer Park Monastery (Tu Viện Lộc Uyển) in Escondido, California, and Magnolia Grove Monastery in Batesville, Mississippi.

There are also branches in Thailand and Hong Kong.

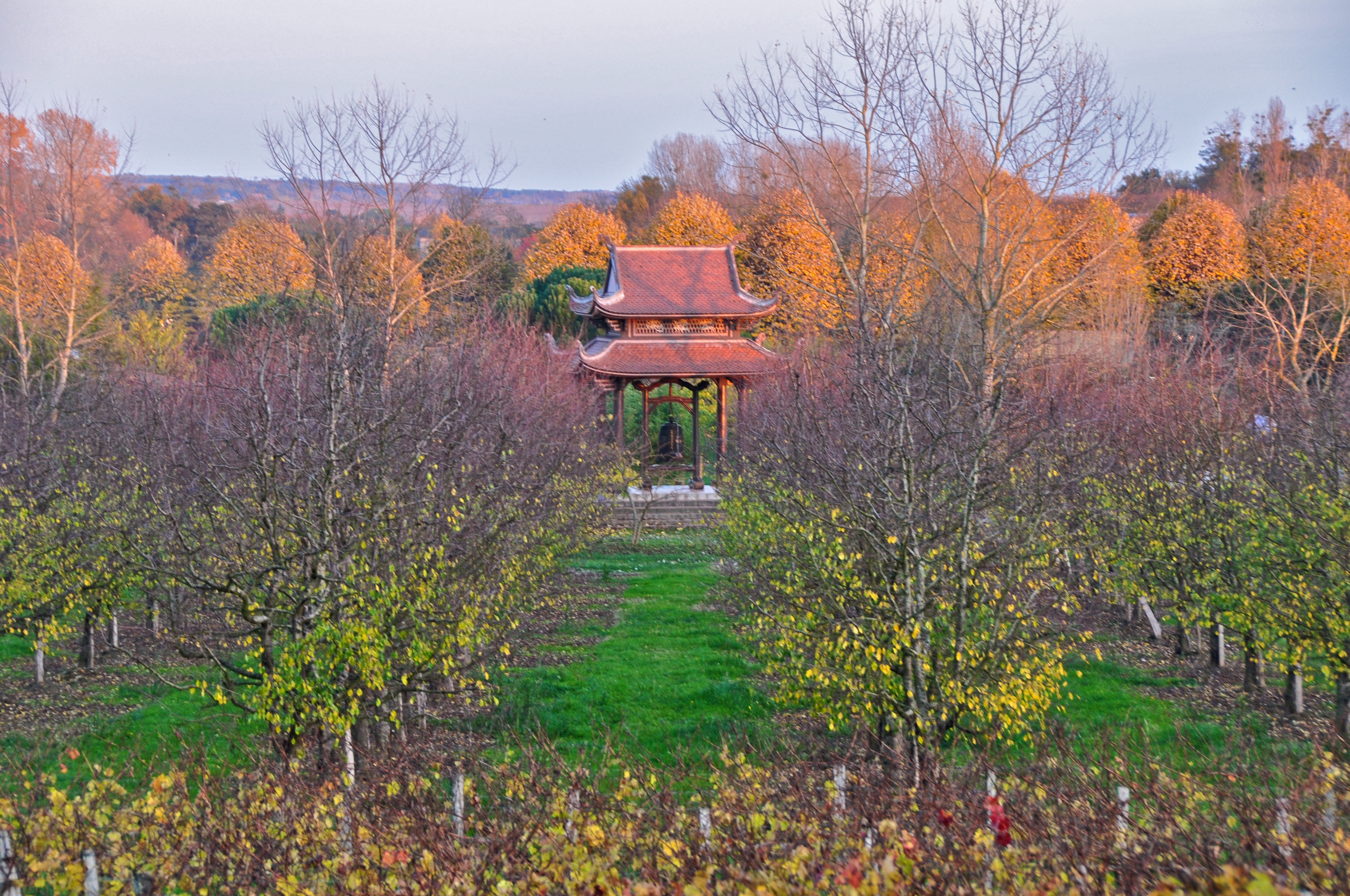
New Hamlet - one of the four settlements of Plum Village

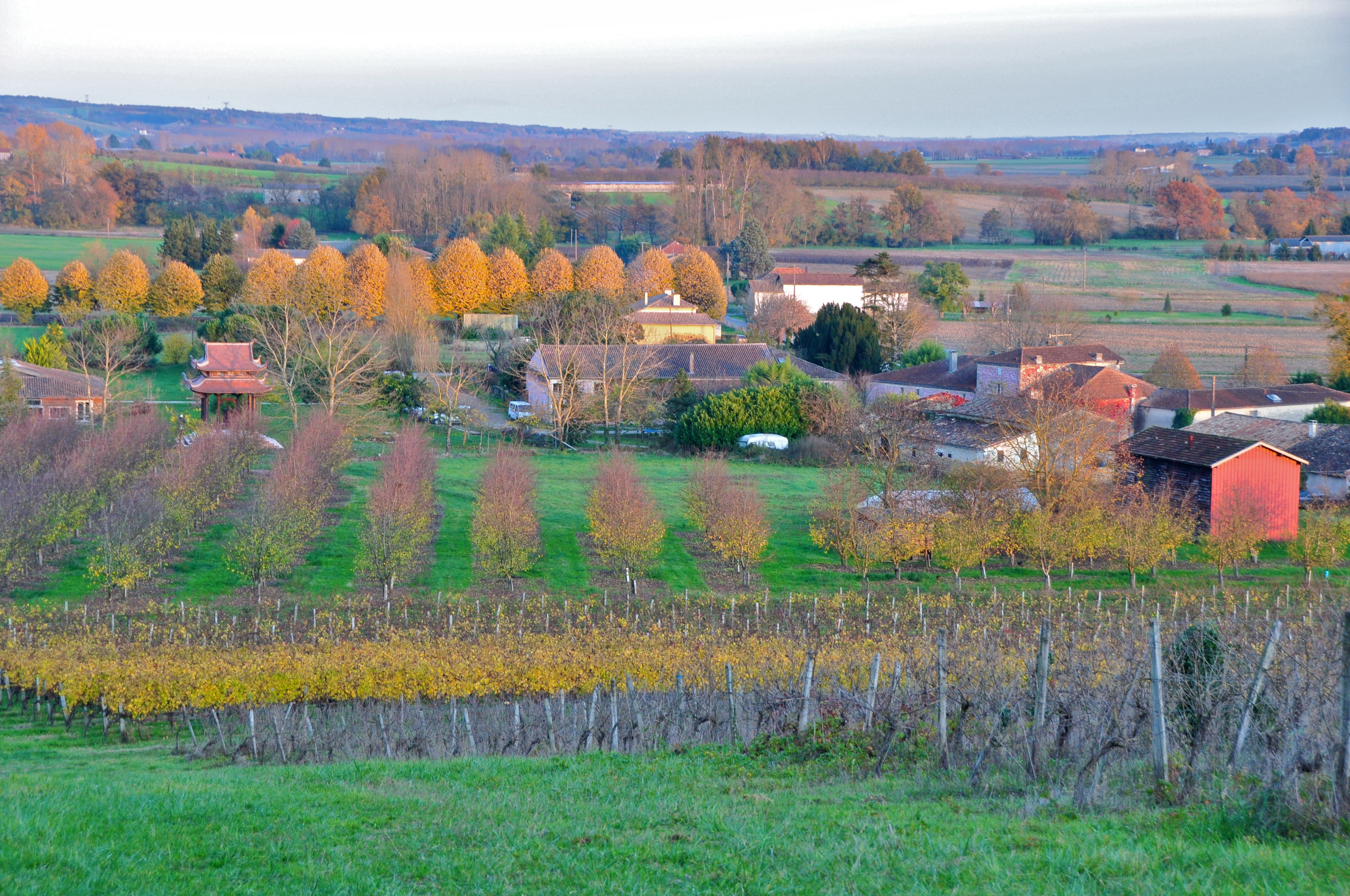
New Hamlet - one of the four settlements of Plum Village

== MIVILUDES Report ==
Between 2018 and 2020, the MIVILUDES, the Interministerial Mission for Vigilance and Action Against Sectarian Aberrations, recorded 12 reports relating to Plum Village concerning sectarian aberrations. According to online magazine Bitter Winter these include claims that after a week in Plum Village "my sister makes astonishing remarks and she is no longer the same person" and that Plum Village “causes enormous damages to the persons by indoctrinating them.”

== See also ==
- Plum Village Tradition
- Plum Village Community of Engaged Buddhism
- Order of Interbeing
- Blue Cliff Monastery
- Deer Park Monastery
- Magnolia Grove Monastery
- Engaged Buddhism
- Mindfulness
