= Deer Park Monastery =

Buddhist monastery in Escondido, California

Coordinates: 33°11′17″N 117°4′25″W

Deer Park Monastery Tu Viện Lộc Uyển 大隱山鹿苑寺
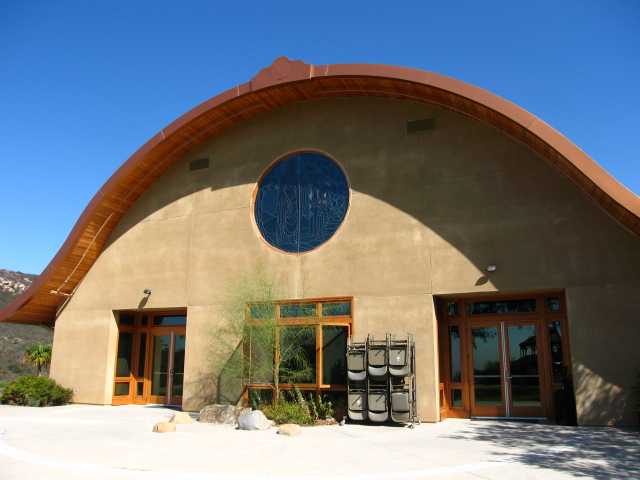
- Meditation Hall

Religion
- Affiliation: Order of Interbeing

Location
- Location: 2499 Melru Lane Escondido, CA 92026
- Country: United States
- Interactive map of Deer Park Monastery; Tu Viện Lộc Uyển 大隱山鹿苑寺

Architecture
- Founder: Thích Nhất Hạnh
- Completed: 2000

Website
- http://www.deerparkmonastery.org/

Deer Park Monastery (Vietnamese: Tu Viện Lộc Uyển) is a 400-acre (1.6 km^{2}) Buddhist monastery in Escondido, California. It was founded in July 2000 by Thích Nhất Hạnh along with monastic and lay practitioners from the Plum Village Tradition. The monastery was under the direct guidance of Thích Nhất Hạnh and his Order of Interbeing in the Vietnamese Thiền tradition.

== Details ==
Deer Park follows the same practices and schedule as Plum Village Monastery and its sister monastery Blue Cliff Monastery in New York state and Magnolia Grove Monastery in Mississippi.

Since its founding in July 2000 the monastery has grown to be very active. In addition to its regular monastic schedule, Deer Park hosts weekly days of mindfulness which are open to the public as well as a variety of themed and general retreats. Over the years the ordained Sangha has been growing and currently consists of 27 monks and 35 nuns. Lay practitioners also live at the monastery.

The monastery is now composed of two hamlets; Solidity Hamlet for monks, laymen and couples. Clarity Hamlet is for nuns and laywomen.

All retreats at Deer Park Monastery include the basic practices of sitting meditation and chanting, walking meditation, mindful eating, group discussions, touching the Earth, total relaxation, and working meditation. Depending on the retreat, extra activities may include private consultations, mountain hiking, bonfires, and song & skit performances. Retreats are for beginners and experienced practitioners of meditation and mindfulness.

== Gallery ==
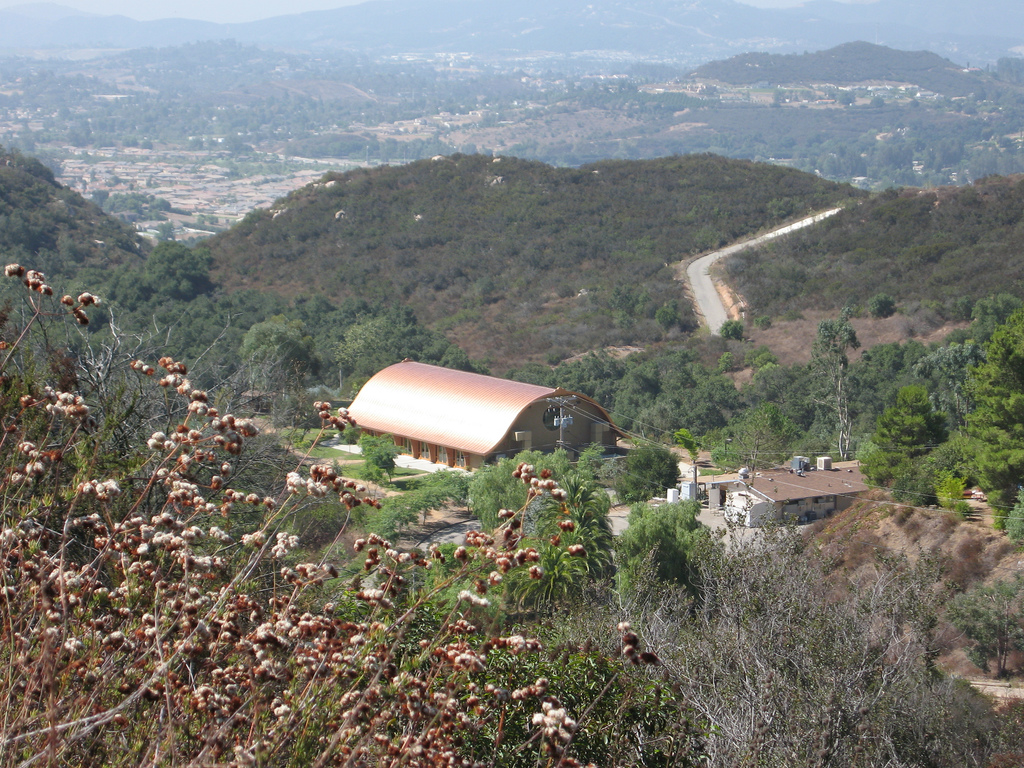

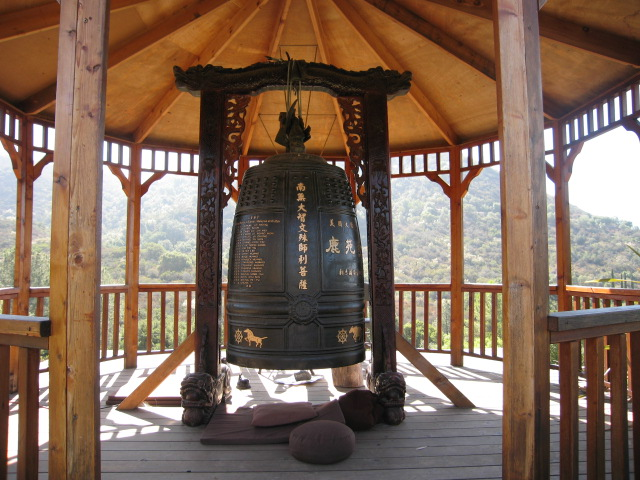

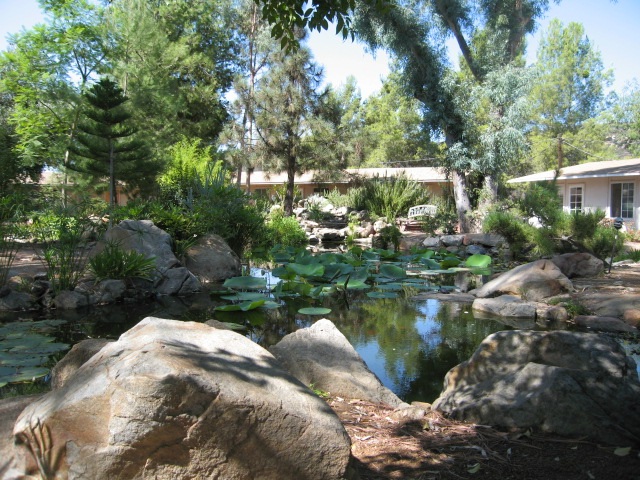

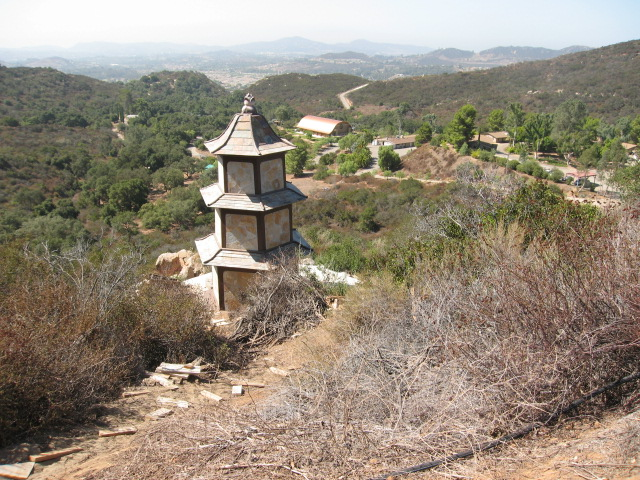

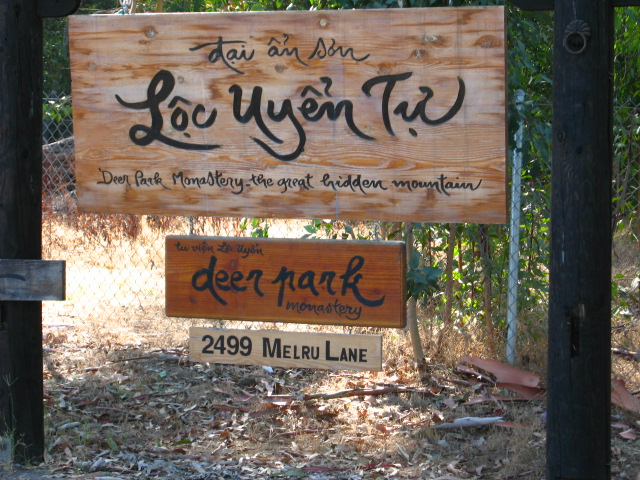

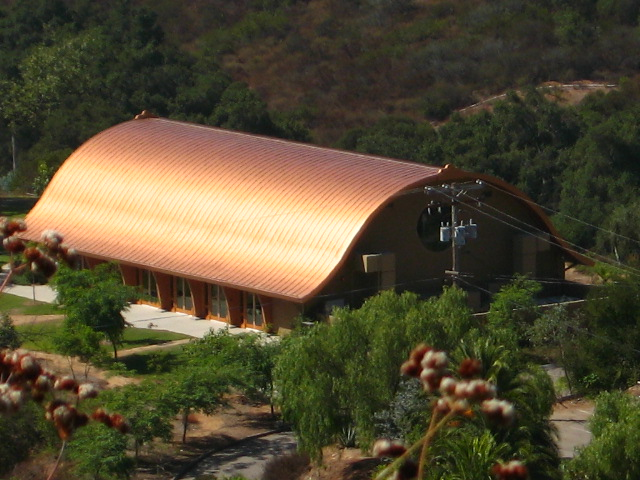

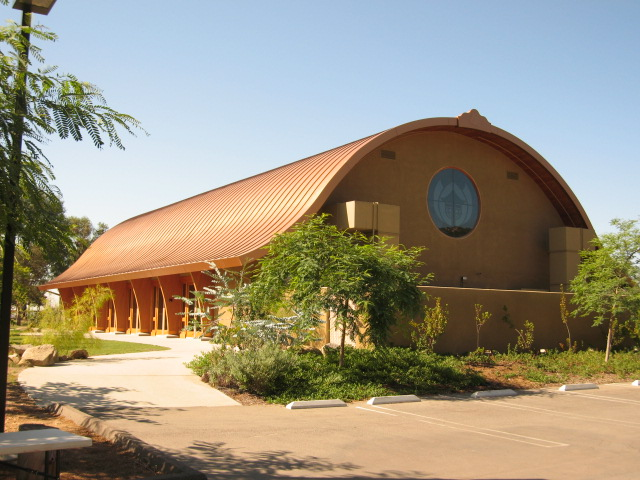

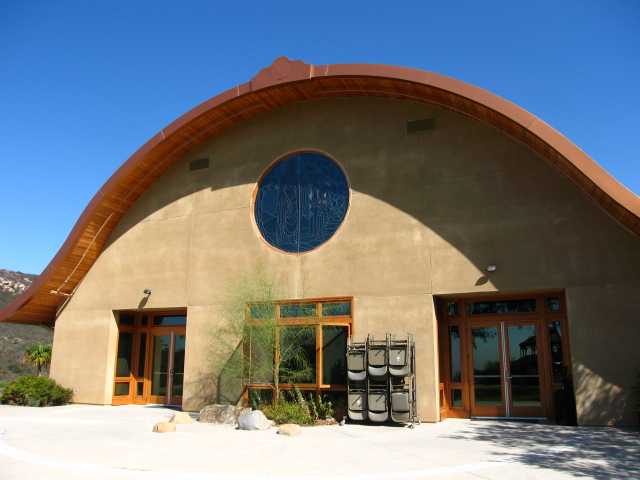

== See also ==
- Buddhism in the United States
- Buddhist Monasticism
- Timeline of Zen Buddhism in the United States
