= Magnolia Grove Monastery =

Buddhist Monastery in Batesville, Mississippi

Coordinates: 34.35940°N 89.99459°W

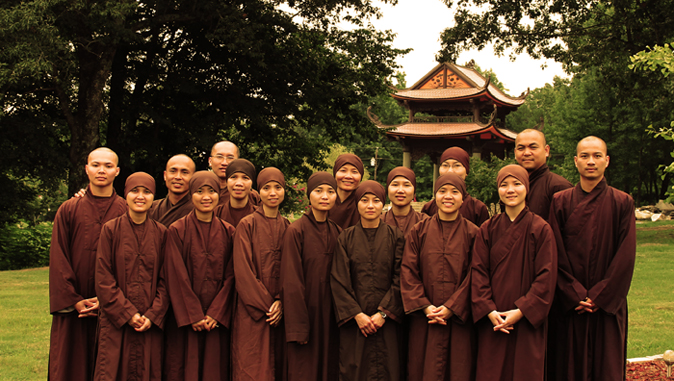
Monks and nuns of the Magnolia Grove Meditation Practice Center.

Magnolia Grove Monastery is a Buddhist monastery in the Plum Village Tradition in Batesville, Mississippi. The 120-acre (0.49 km^{2}) grounds are located near Memphis, Tennessee. In October 2005 Thích Nhất Hạnh officially accepted the monastery. They are closely in touch with the Plum Village Monastery for resources and support. Magnolia Grove Monastery is one of the three monasteries in the United States which are under the spiritual guidance of Thích Nhất Hạnh. The other two are Blue Cliff Monastery in New York and Deer Park Monastery in California.

Twice weekly, on Thursdays and Sundays, public Days of Mindfulness are held, as well as regular retreats and special events.

== See also ==
- Order of Interbeing
- Buddhism in the United States
- Buddhist Monasticism
