= Vạn Hạnh Monastery =

Vạn Hạnh Monastery is a Thiền Buddhist temple in Ho Chi Minh City, the largest city in Vietnam. The temple is located at 716 Nguyễn Kiệm Street on the road between Go Vap and Phu Nhuan districts. It is the location of the main Buddhist training centre for sangha in Vietnam, and is also the office of the Vietnamese Buddhist Research Institute.

Before the fall of Saigon in 1975, the site of the temple was the campus of the school of applied science of Vạn Hạnh Buddhist University, under the leadership of Thích Minh Châu. In 1976, with the reunification of Vietnam. It was converted into a Thiền meditation temple and Buddhist research centre.

The temple is located on a block of land of one hectare in size. It comprises a main ceremonial hall, a patriarch hall, living and dining quarters for the sangha and separate facilities for various educational institutions. These include the office of the Vietnamese Buddhist Research Institute, the office of the Society for the Translation of the Mahayana sutras and the main Buddhist training centre in Vietnam, which trains Buddhist sangha.

The temple fate was built in 1990 along the architectural model of the Buddhist temples in the central city of Huế, under the administration of Thích Tâm Đoan and Thích Tịnh Quang. The main hall is two-storied. The ground storey is the main ceremonial hall, with a white statue of Gautama Buddha seated on a lotus in the centre of the hall. One either side of the main hall are reading rooms of the temple's library, which stocks a large range of religious documents. The upper storey contains the guest room and the office of the abbot.

The patriarch hall of the temple is also two-storied. The upper storey is for paying homage to the Buddha and to the patriarchs. On the altar of the patriarch altar is Thích Tịnh Khiết, the first head of the United Buddhist Congregation of Vietnam. The ground floor serves as the dharma hall, where dharma talks are held.

Vạn Hạnh Thiền Temple is the working office of the Buddhist Research Institute of Vietnam, where a team of Buddhist scholars works under Thích Minh Châu, who holds a doctorate in Buddhism and psychology. The institute is divided into departments, one for Vietnamese Buddhism, world Buddhism and one for printing and distribution. Another team is devoted towards translating Mahayana scriptures from Chinese into Vietnamese, in addition to the translation of the Pali Canon.

The temple is also a major contributor in the training of Vietnamese Buddhist monks in the south of the country. It is the host of an institute of higher education in Buddhism, at an equivalent level to a university degree. Monks and nuns are accepted through an examination process to start a four-year course. Since 1984, the school has run three courses, training more than 400 members of the sangha.
