= Engaged Buddhism =

Practical application of Buddhist teachings

Engaged Buddhism, also known as socially engaged Buddhism, refers to a Buddhist social movement that emerged in Asia in the 20th century. It is composed of Buddhists who seek to apply Buddhist ethics, insights acquired from meditation practice, and the teachings of the Buddhist dharma to contemporary situations of social, political, environmental, and economic suffering, and injustice.

Modern engaged Buddhism emerged in Vietnam in the 1950s, from the teachings of Thiền Buddhist teacher Thích Nhất Hạnh. It was popularized by the Indian jurist, politician, and social reformer B. R. Ambedkar, who inspired the Dalit Buddhist movement in the 1950s. It has since spread to the Indian subcontinent and the West.

During the 1960s, the terms "engaged Buddhism" and "socially engaged Buddhism" were taken up by loosely-connected networks of Buddhists in Asia and the West to describe their adaptation of Buddhist values and ethical conduct to social and political activism. This included a range of non-violent social and political activities such as peacemaking, promotion of human rights, environmental protection, rural development, combatting ethnic violence, opposition to warfare, and support of women's rights. With globalisation and technological advancement, engaged Buddhist organizations and efforts have spread across the globe; an example is the Buddhist Peace Fellowship.

== Origins ==
Vietnamese Thiền Buddhist teacher Thích Nhất Hạnh coined the term "Engaged Buddhism" in his collection of articles, "A Fresh Look at Buddhism". Engaged Buddhism emerged from a need to respond to world crises, particularly the Vietnam War. The term was new, but Buddhism that engages with social and political issues had already occurred throughout the world.

Nhất Hạnh was inspired by the humanistic Buddhism reform movement in China led by Taixu and Yinshun and later propagated in Taiwan by Cheng Yen and Hsing Yun. At first, Nhất Hạnh described the concept by using Literary Chinese, the liturgical language of Vietnamese Buddhism, calling it 'Worldly Buddhism' (入世佛教). During the Vietnam War, he and his sangha (spiritual community) responded to the suffering around them, in part by adopting the nonviolence activism techniques of Mahatma Gandhi in India and of Reverend Martin Luther King Jr. in the United States. This work was seen as part of their meditation and mindfulness practice, not as something apart from it.

As early as 1946, Walpola Rahula identified an explicit social ethos present in the earliest recorded Buddhist teachings. He noted that the Buddha encouraged early monks to travel in order to benefit the largest number of people, and that his discourses to lay people often included practical instructions on social and economic matters, rather than being purely concerned with philosophical or soteriological concerns.

== Teachings ==
Engaged Buddhism applies the teachings of the Buddha to social life in order to bring about social change. Engaged Buddhists hope to connect traditional Buddhist beliefs to protest and social action. One way to view Engaged Buddhism is through Thích Nhất Hạnh's "The Fourteen Precepts of Engaged Buddhism", which serve as guidelines for living with a stronger social awareness:

1. Do not be idolatrous about or bound to any doctrine, theory, or ideology, even Buddhist ones. Buddhist systems of thought are guiding means; they are not absolute truth.
2. Do not think the knowledge you presently possess is changeless, absolute truth. Avoid being narrow minded and bound to present views. Learn and practice nonattachment from views in order to be open to receive others' viewpoints. Truth is found in life and not merely in conceptual knowledge. Be ready to learn throughout your entire life and to observe reality in yourself and in the world at all times.
3. Do not force others, including children, by any means whatsoever, to adopt your views, whether by authority, threat, money, propaganda, or even education. However, through compassionate dialogue, help others renounce fanaticism and narrow-mindedness.
4. Do not avoid suffering or close your eyes before suffering. Do not lose awareness of the existence of suffering in the life of the world. Find ways to be with those who are suffering, including personal contact, visits, images and sounds. By such means, awaken yourself and others to the reality of suffering in the world.
5. Do not accumulate wealth while millions are hungry. Do not take as the aim of your life fame, profit, wealth, or sensual pleasure. Live simply and share time, energy, and material resources with those who are in need.
6. Do not maintain anger or hatred. Learn to penetrate and transform them when they are still seeds in your consciousness. As soon as they arise, turn your attention to your breath in order to see and understand the nature of your hatred.
7. Do not lose yourself in dispersion and in your surroundings. Practice mindful breathing to come back to what is happening in the present moment. Be in touch with what is wondrous, refreshing, and healing both inside and around you. Plant seeds of joy, peace, and understanding in yourself in order to facilitate the work of transformation in the depths of your consciousness.
8. Do not utter words that can create discord and cause the community to break. Make every effort to reconcile and resolve all conflicts, however small.
9. Do not say untruthful things for the sake of personal interest or to impress people. Do not utter words that cause division and hatred. Do not spread news that you do not know to be certain. Do not criticise or condemn things of which you are not sure. Always speak truthfully and constructively. Have the courage to speak out about situations of injustice, even when doing so may threaten your own safety.
10. Do not use the Buddhist community for personal gain or profit, or transform your community into a political party. A religious community, however, should take a clear stand against oppression and injustice and should strive to change the situation without engaging in partisan conflicts.
11. Do not live with a vocation that is harmful to humans and nature. Do not invest in companies that deprive others of their chance to live. Select a vocation that helps realise your ideal of compassion.
12. Do not kill. Do not let others kill. Find whatever means possible to protect life and prevent war.
13. Possess nothing that should belong to others. Respect the property of others, but prevent others from profiting from human suffering or the suffering of other species on Earth.
14. Do not mistreat your body. Learn to handle it with respect. Do not look on your body as only an instrument. Preserve vital energies (sexual, breath, spirit) for the realisation of the Way. (For brothers and sisters who are not monks and nuns:) Sexual expression should not take place without love and commitment. In sexual relations, be aware of future suffering that may be caused. To preserve the happiness of others, respect the rights and commitments of others. Be fully aware of the responsibility of bringing new lives into the world. Meditate on the world into which you are bringing new beings.

— Thích Nhất Hạnh,

B. R. Ambedkar, a civil rights activist and politician, also advocated for a type of Engaged Buddhism; known as Navayana Buddhism. This branch of Buddhism aims to inspire social change, providing dignity and humanity to Ambedkar and the Dalit community. Ambedkar's principles stemmed from reinterpretations of Buddhist beliefs such as varna, and the commitment to Liberty, Equality, and Fraternity.

B. R Ambedkar beliefs strayed from typical Buddhist understandings:

Varna and Jati were seen as a system woven together to form the Hindu Caste System. Ambedkar argues that Varna gave Hindus the religious justification for a structured caste system, while Jati was the everyday people experienced. This narrative pushed against claims of the caste system deriving from a primitive system of labor division.

== In India ==
In India, a form of engaged Buddhism founded by B.R. Ambedkar started as a Buddhist revival movement called the Dalit Buddhist movement. Ambedkar's socially engaged Buddhism focuses on economic justice, political freedom, and moral striving. Ambedkar converted to Buddhism in 1956 and initiated what is called Ambedkar Buddhism, when in October 1956 in Nagpur, nearly 400,000 Dalits converted from Hinduism. His book The Buddha and His Dhamma was published in 1957, after his death.

Buddhist teachings invite followers to take responsibility for themselves, which in engaged Buddhist interpretation, is taking responsibility for the entire sangha; the larger community, and our ecosystem. Ambedkar warns that if followers spend too long in personal meditation practice, secluded from social relationships, it could result in an irresponsible community. This is a collectivist notion of sangha as people working together for a society of justice, wherein Buddhist practice becomes the engaged activity of social change.

== Socially engaged Buddhism in the West ==
In the West, like the East, engaged Buddhism attempts to link authentic Buddhist practice—particularly mindfulness—with social action. It has two main centers: the Plum Village monastic community in Loubes-Bernac, France and the Community of Mindful Living in Berkeley, California. Both centers are tied to Nhất Hạnh's Unified Buddhist Church.

The current Dalai Lama also encouraged Buddhists to be more involved in the socio-political realm:

In 1998, while on retreat in Bodh Gaya, India... the Dalai Lama told those of us who were participating in a Buddhist-Christian dialogue that sometimes, Buddhists have not acted vigorously to address social and political problems. He told our group, "In this, we have much to learn from the Christians."

=== Organizations ===
Many organizations were established to help build the movement of engaged Buddhists. These include the Soka Gakkai International, Buddhist Peace Fellowship, Buddhist Global Relief, the International Network of Engaged Buddhists, the Zen Peacemakers, and the Order of Interbeing. Other engaged Buddhist groups include the Benevolent Organisation for Development, Health and Insight, Gaden Relief Projects, Earthworks Centre foundation, Peace is an action movement, the UK's Network of Buddhist Organisations, Fo Guang Shan, and Tzu Chi.

The School of Youth for Social Service was established by Nhất Hạnh in 1964. It trained social workers through the teachings of Engaged Buddhism. Members of the school helped relieve suffering and rebuild villages for those affected by the Vietnam War.

=== Notable figures ===
Prominent figures in the movement include Robert Aitken Roshi, Joanna Macy, Gary Snyder, Alan Senauke, Sulak Sivaraksa, Daisaku Ikeda, Maha Ghosananda, Sylvia Wetzel, Joan Halifax, Tara Brach, Taigen Dan Leighton, Ken Jones, Jan Willis, Bhante Sujato, Bhikkhu Bodhi, B. R. Ambedkar, and Ajahn Buddhadasa.

== See also ==
- Buddhist ethics
- Buddhist Peace Fellowship
- Buddhist socialism
- Dalit Buddhist movement
- Dhammayietra
- Engaged spirituality
- Humanistic Buddhism
- Navayana
- Religion and environmentalism in Buddhism
- Religion and peacebuilding
