= Thénac, Dordogne =

Thénac
- Commune
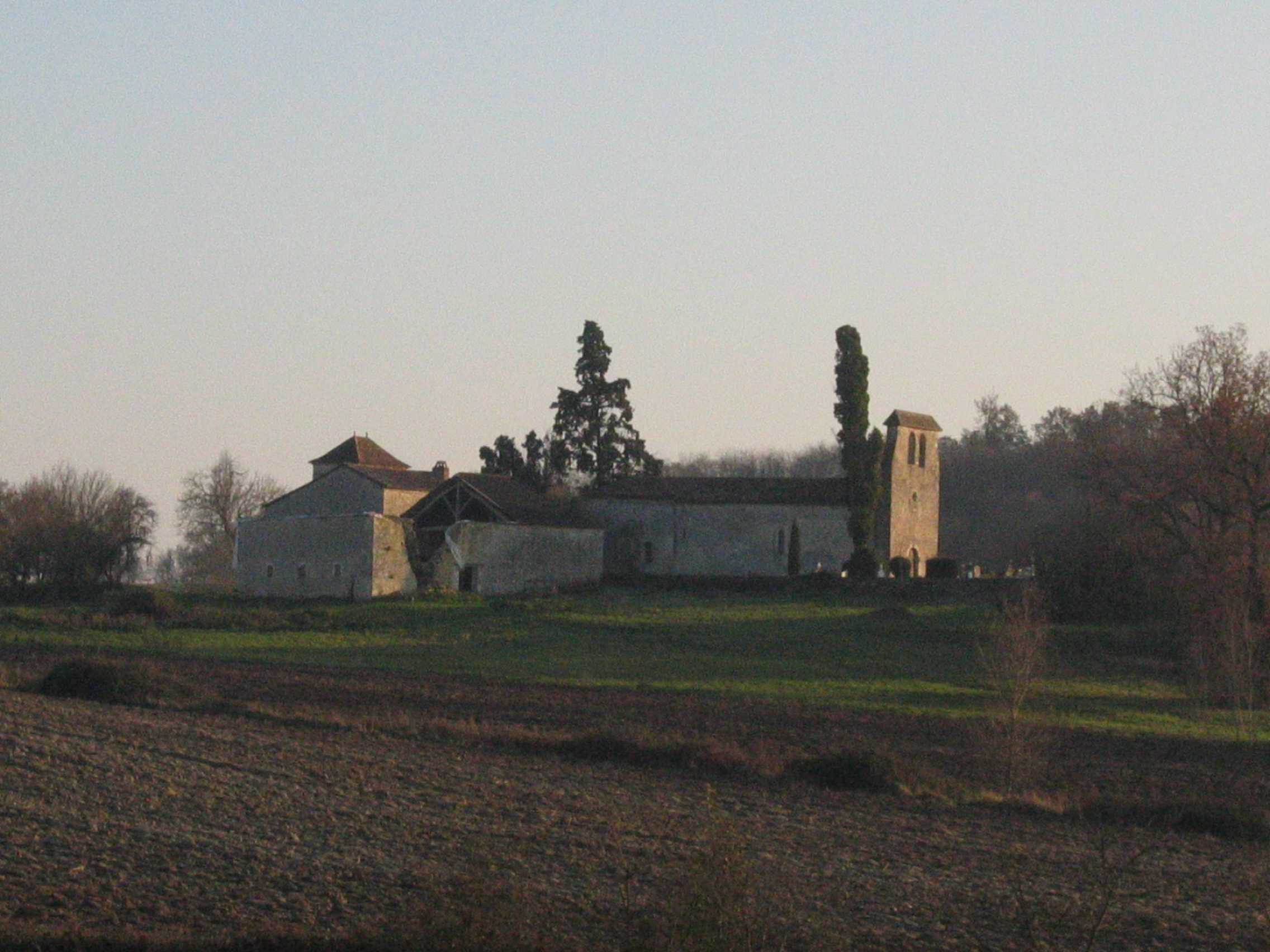
- Priory of Monbos

- Coat of arms
- Location of Thénac
- Location within France Location within Nouvelle-Aquitaine
- Coordinates: 44°45′04″N 0°20′31″E
- Country: France
- Region: Nouvelle-Aquitaine
- Department: Dordogne
- Arrondissement: Bergerac
- Canton: Sud-Bergeracois
- Intercommunality: CA Bergeracoise

Government
  - Mayor (2020–2026): Jean-Jacques Chapellet
- Area^{1}: 20.34 km^{2} (7.85 sq mi)
- Elevation: 170 m (560 ft)
- Highest elevation: 191 m (627 ft)
- Lowest elevation: 75 m (246 ft)
- Population (2023): 443
  - Density: 21.8/km^{2} (56.4/sq mi)
- Time zone: UTC+01:00 (CET)
  - Summer (DST): UTC+02:00 (CEST)
- INSEE/Postal code: 24549 /24240
- ^{1} French Land Register data, which excludes lakes, ponds, glaciers > 1 km^{2} (0.386 sq mi or 247 acres) and river estuaries.

Thénac (French pronunciation: [tenak]; Occitan: Tenac) is a commune in the Dordogne department in Nouvelle-Aquitaine in southwestern France. In 1973 it absorbed two former communes: Monbos and Puyguilhem.

== Population ==
Historical population
Year	Pop.	±% p.a.
1968	436	—
1975	379	−1.98%
1982	314	−2.65%
1990	300	−0.57%
1999	341	+1.43%
2007	369	+0.99%
2012	366	−0.16%
2017	488	+5.92%
2023	443	−1.60%
Source: INSEE

== See also ==
- Communes of the Dordogne department
