= Plum Village Community of Engaged Buddhism =

Buddhism organization in the United States

The Plum Village Community of Engaged Buddhism, Inc. (formerly the Unified Buddhist Church, Inc.) and its sister organization, the French Congregation Bouddhique Zen Village des Pruniers are the governance bodies of the monasteries, press and fundraising organizations established by the Zen Buddhist monk Thich Nhat Hanh. The name Unified Buddhist Church, which originated in Vietnam, was intended to signify that this tradition practices to embrace all the teachings of the Buddha, whether they belong to the Mahāyāna or Theravāda stream.

The organization represents Thich Nhat Hanh and his sangha in the United States. The Plum Village Community of Engaged Buddhism Inc. is the governing body for Parallax Press (Berkeley, California), Deer Park Monastery (Escondido, California), Blue Cliff Monastery (Pine Bush, New York), Magnolia Grove Monastery (Batesville, Mississippi), Thich Nhat Hanh Foundation (Escondido, California), and the Community of Mindful Living. Other initiatives of the PVCEB include Wake Up and Wake Up Schools.

== History ==
On December 31, 1963, the General Assembly of Vietnamese Unified Buddhism came to a resolution to unify all Buddhist congregations as a single congregation called the Unified Buddhist Church of Vietnam (“UBCVN”) thus realizing a desire embraced by Buddhist believers for nearly fifty years. In 1969, the Vietnamese Buddhist monk Thich Nhat Hanh was nominated by the UBCVN to be the chair of the Vietnamese Buddhist Peace Delegation to the Paris Peace Accords. Nhat Hanh registered Eglise Bouddhique Unifiée du Vietnam (Unified Buddhist Church of Vietnam) as the organization to represent the Buddhist voice in the peace process in France. The Eglise Bouddhique Unifiée du Vietnam continued to serve as the legal entity for Nhat Hanh's work after the end of the war. As Nhat Hanh's teachings became more internationally known, especially in the United States, a separate but related organization was established in Vermont as the Unified Buddhist Church, Inc., in 1998.

Through the Unified Buddhist Church, Nhat Hanh established the Sweet Potato community in 1975, which later became the Plum Village Monastery in 1982; the Dharma Cloud Temple and the Dharma Nectar Temple in 1988; and the Adornment of Loving Kindness Temple in 1995. Thich Nhat Hanh’s sangha (or Buddhist community) in France is usually referred to as the “Plum Village Sangha.” A nonsectarian community of about 200 monks, nuns, and resident lay-practitioners live permanently at Plum Village, whilst its annual visitors total some 8,000.

In 2017, the Unified Buddhist Church Board of Directors decided to update the name to better reflect and represent the Plum Village community. Since the founding of Plum Village in France, the Plum Village name has been widely associated with Nhat Hanh and his Sangha, and Engaged Buddhism has been referred to as the type of Buddhism that is practiced by the Plum Village community. Hence the new name, Plum Village Community of Engaged Buddhism, Inc. (“PVCEB”), for the US organization. It is a non-profit 501(c)3 organization.

== See also ==
- Thich Nhat Hanh
- Thích Quảng Độ
- Buddhism in the United States
- Buddhist Monasticism
- Unified Buddhist Sangha of Vietnam
