= Prison contemplative programs =

Practices like meditation and yoga offered at correctional institutions

Prison contemplative programs are classes or practices (which include meditation, yoga, contemplative prayer or similar) that are offered at correctional institutions for inmates and prison staff. There are measured or anecdotally reported benefits from studies of these programs such as stress relief for inmates and staff. These programs are gaining in acceptance in North America and Europe but are not mainstream.

These rehabilitation programs may be part of prison religious offerings and ministry or may be wholly secular. Of those sponsored by religious organizations some are presented in non-sectarian or non-religious formats. They have had increasing interest in North American and European prisons since the early 1970s. Contemplative practices in prison however date back at least to Pennsylvania prison reforms in the late 18th century and may have analogs in older correctional history.

In North America, they have been sponsored by Eastern religious traditions, Christian groups, new spiritual movements such as the Scientology-related Criminon prison program, as well as interfaith groups.

== History ==
Early Pennsylvania prisons, based on Quaker ideas, used meditation upon one's crimes as a core component of rehabilitation. When combined with isolation this became known as the Pennsylvania System. James Mease in the early 19th century described this approach involving isolation and meditation and the logic behind it:

[Repentance of crime is produced by:] (1) a tiresome state of mind from idle seclusion; (2) self-condemnation arising from deep, long-continued and poignant reflections upon a guilty life. All our endeavors, therefore, ought to be directed to the production of that state of mind, which will cause a convict to concentrate his thoughts upon his forlorn condition, to abstract himself from the world, and to think of nothing except that suffering and the privations he endures, the result of his crimes. Such a state of mind is totally incompatible with the least mechanical operation, but is only to be brought about, if ever, by complete mental and bodily insulation.

This approach was critiqued between the late 19th and early 20th centuries, specifically with research showing the isolation it incorporated was causing more harm than benefit. Modern contemplative programs are voluntary and generally in groups instead of in isolation.

=== Modern programs ===
In the 1970s organizations such as the Prison-Ashram Project and SYDA Foundation began programs to offer meditation or yoga instruction to inmates. In subsequent years more religious groups began meditation programs, such as the Prison Dharma Network in 1989.

In India these programs became better known after a highly publicized set of prison reforms in 1993. Kiran Bedi assumed the role of Inspector General of Prisons which included overseeing Tihar Prisons. She introduced yoga and large-scale meditation programs at that prison and these programs were filmed and released as the documentary Doing Time, Doing Vipassana. Because of her reforms there she received the Ramon Magsaysay Award in 1994. Four more religious groups have established meditation programs at the prison, and intensive retreats inside the prison are offered each year. In North America, vipassana meditation courses are regularly held at the Donaldson Correctional Facility in Alabama through the Vipassana Prison Trust.

One issue with these programs is finding suitable places for meditation, since prisons might not have appropriate places that are quiet or away from activity. Despite these challenges, in 2004 the Ratna Peace Initiative was founded by Margot and Cliff Neuman in Boulder, Colorado, to support their meditation work in state and federal prisons in Colorado and 47 other states. Ratna (pronounced "RAHT-na") Peace Initiative is a 501(c)(3) non-profit organization offering peace of mind to prison inmates and veterans with PTSD through training and social education in meditation and other mindfulness practices. In New York City, Anneke Lucas, who has alleged that she was the victim of child sex abuse, has used her story of trauma, recovery, and skills as a yoga and meditation teacher to build a non-profit organization that brings volunteer yoga and meditation instructors into prisons and jails citywide.

In Arizona State Prison in 1989 a Prison Inner Peace Program was started in the Echo Unit by Michael Todd and Richard Wirta, overseen by Thomas L. Magnuson, Psych Associate II, of the Echo Behavioral Health Unit. There was reportedly profoundly lowered recidivism amongst those who completed the program.

Programs have extended outside prisons to include prisoner reintegration into society and efforts to teach at-risk youth. Sri Sri Ravi Shankar's Prison Smart Los Angeles Youth Project teaches meditation to gangs.

==== Prison Animal Programs ====
As of 2014, prison animal programs are present in all 50 states in the United States. Other countries known to have utilized them are Canada, Scotland, England, South Africa and Australia. A wide variety of animals have been used in these programs - domesticated animals like dogs and cats, livestock like cows, and even wildlife like raccoons and rabbits. One program in Ohio even had a domesticated deer and llama.

== Benefits ==
Generally, modern meditation programs are described as helping inmates deal with the stress of confinement. Studies of Transcendental Meditation programs specifically found reduced aggression, reduced rule infractions, and reduced recidivism up to six years after release. Anecdotally, in a 1984 Guatemalan prison program that was studied, guards reported less violence and drug use when inmates and guards both took meditation programs.

In a study published in 2004 authors Komanduri Srinivasa Murty, Angela M. Owens, and Ashwin Vyas conclude the benefits of meditation programs in prisons include:

- reduced drug use, recidivism, violence, anger, and self-destructive and risk-taking behavior
- enhanced employability and balanced lifestyle
- increased self-awareness, self-confidence, and hopefulness.

They further contend that those programs reduced alcohol and substance abuse.

== Controversies ==
Prison contemplative programs attract controversy when they are seen as religious missionary work. Prisons have sometimes asked religious groups to explicitly offer non-religious programs.

Not all prisons allow contemplative programs. Some inmates or organizations have used religious freedom provisions as a way to secure programs in prisons. In the United States prisoners are allowed to hold any religious beliefs, but the courts have decided that prisons have some latitude in deciding which religious practices occur. Prisons are allowed to consider inmate safety, security, and operations of the prison when considering a religious program. But court actions recognizing Zen Buddhism as an "acceptable religion" secured meditation programs in New York prisons. Author Christopher Queen feels that funding in the United States for prison contemplative programs was hampered in 1997 by the repeal of the Religious Freedom Restoration Act of 1993.

== Documentaries ==
Two documentaries depicting prison meditation programs have received significant review. Doing Time, Doing Vipassana released in 1997 documented a large scale meditation program at Tihar Prisons in India with over a thousand inmates. The results of the program, organized by the Burmese Buddhist group led by S. N. Goenka, were considered very positive. That program and film brought greater attention to prison contemplative programs.

The Dhamma Brothers released in 2007 documented a smaller-scale, optional meditation program implemented at Donaldson Correctional Facility in Bessemer, Alabama. That film depicts controversy as the meditation program is perceived by residents as missionary and anti-Christian.

== See also ==
- Prison reform
- Prison religion
- Remission for Reading
