= Prison religion =

Religious beliefs and practices of prisoners

Prison religion includes the religious beliefs and practices of prison inmates, usually stemming from or including concepts surrounding their imprisonment and accompanying lifestyle. "Prison Ministry" is a larger concept, including the support of the spiritual and religious needs of prison guards and staff, whose work in an often demanding and brutal environment often creates a special need for pastoral care, similar to the care that is extended to the military, police officers, and fire fighters.

== History ==
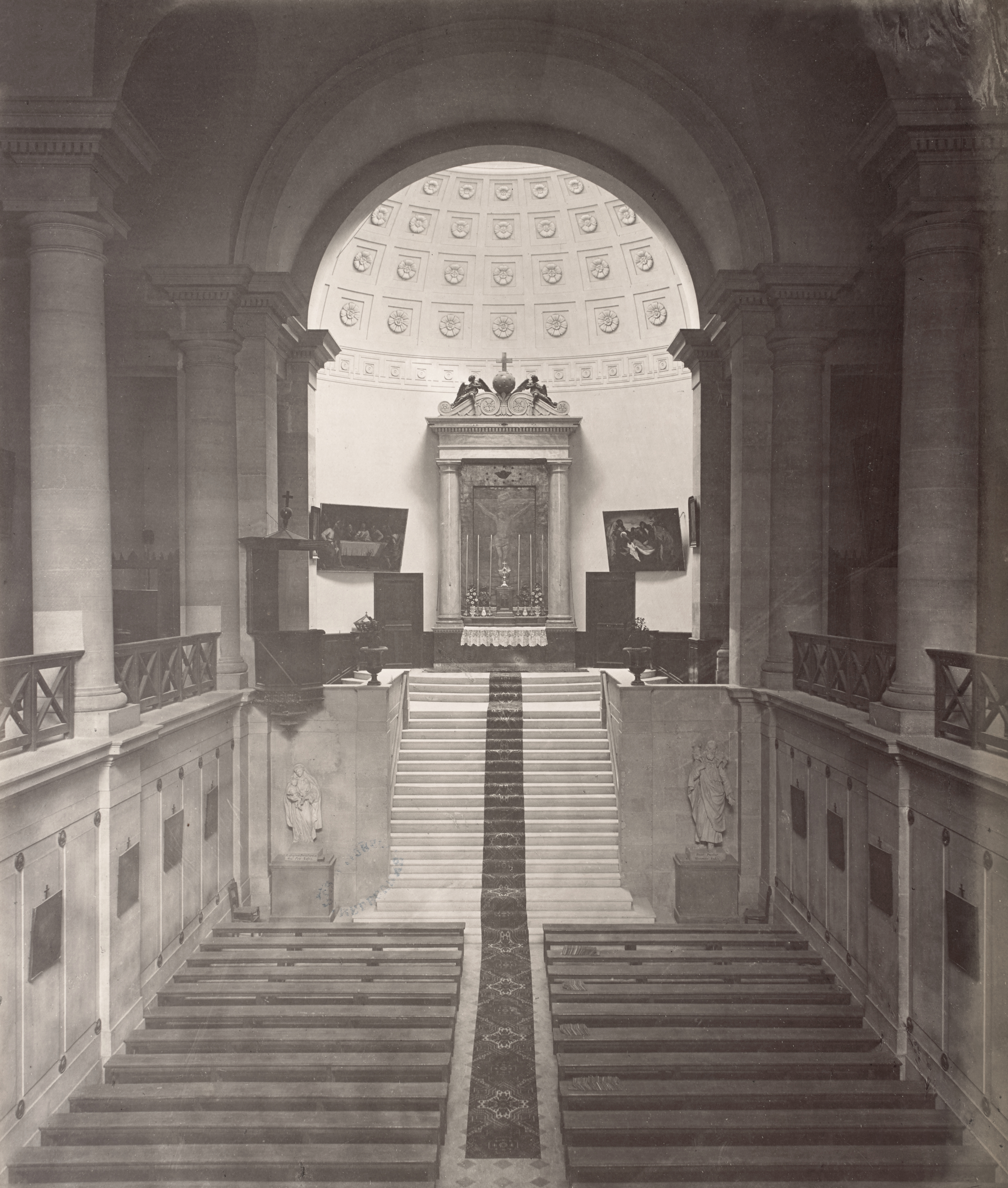
The chapel of the Saint-Pélagie Prison, Paris

Many religious groups often supply scripture and reading material, organize programs and worship, and train chaplains for work in prisons. Members of religious groups also engage in missionary activity, as there have been many instances of conversion throughout history. For instance, one of the earliest introductions of Islam into Eastern Europe was through the work of an early 11th-century Muslim prisoner who was captured by the Byzantines during their war against Muslims. The Muslim prisoner was brought into the territory of the Pechenegs, where he taught and converted individuals to Islam.

In the United States, early colonists originated the concept of the penitentiary as a place where inmates would demonstrate their penance and remorse for their crimes through prayer and reflection.

English prison chaplains also heard confessions from condemned prisoners, some of which were published – for example, the 18th century Ordinary of Newgate's Account. Such accounts presented the prisoners as coming to terms with their guilt and preparing for salvation.

Chaplains have worked with prisoners and prison staff for many years, even before formal legislation addressed the constitutional rights of inmates.

A 2005 Journal for the Scientific Study of Religion study suggests that the practice of religion significantly reduces the chance of prisoners to engage in verbal or physical altercations, and increases the likelihood of reform after completing prison sentence time.

== Reasons for religious involvement ==
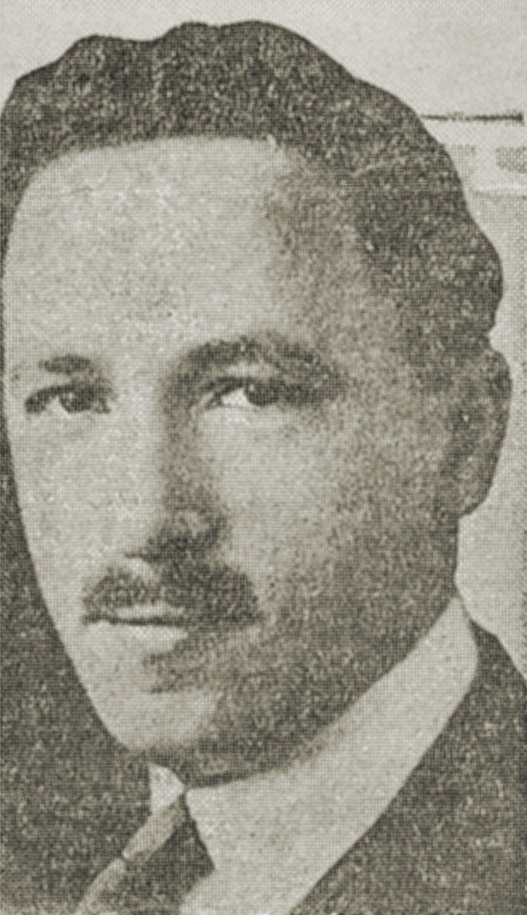
Rabbi Philip R. Alstat, c. 1920

Prisoners may become involved with religion while incarcerated for a variety of reasons ranging from the materially pragmatic to the personal and spiritual. According to research conducted by sociologist Harry R. Dammer, some of the more prominent reasons include:

1. Gaining direction and meaning in one's life.
2. Improving one's concept of self.
3. Promoting personal behavioral change.
4. Gaining protection.
5. Meeting other inmates.
6. Meeting volunteers.
7. Obtaining prison resources
8. Simply wanting to get out of their cells.

In 1970, Rabbi Philip R. Alstat, who served as Jewish chaplain for The Tombs, the Manhattan Detention Facility, for thirty years, and also served as the Secretary of the National Jewish Council of Prison Chaplains, shared his vision of prison ministry by saying, "My goals are the same as those of the prison authorities – to make better human beings. The only difference is that their means are discipline, security, and iron bars. Mine are the spiritual ministrations that operate with the mind and the heart."

== See also ==
- Prison contemplative programs
- Prison reform
- Religion in United States prisons
- Conversion to Islam in prisons

=== Organizations ===
- Aleph Institute
- International Network of Prison Ministries
- Crossroad Bible Institute
- Buddhist Peace Fellowship
- Exodus Ministries
- Prison Fellowship
- Prison Mindfulness Institute
- International Prison Chaplains' Association
