= Religion in United States prisons =

Inmates incarcerated in the United States penal system practice a variety of religions. Their basic constitutional right to worship has been reinforced by decades of court decisions and more recently by the Religious Land Use and Institutionalized Persons Act. However, several of these court rulings have also set limitations on these rights when prisoner demands are seen to impede prison safety and function.

== Organizations and programs ==
While inmates often worship as individuals they also frequently do so within the structure provided by the programs of religious groups and denominations tending to the incarcerated. Nearly all correctional facilities provide support for at least the Abrahamic religions: Christianity, Islam and Judaism. Chaplains, volunteers and other representatives of these groups may organize religious services as often as daily in large prisons, while also providing pastoral care to inmates and staff.

=== Contemplative programs ===
Some U.S. prisons offer contemplative programs for inmates and staff, which may include meditation, yoga or contemplative prayer. While these programs are sometimes secular they are also frequently sponsored by religious organizations and interfaith groups. Such programs have an established history. In the 19th century, Quaker ideas were co-opted by Pennsylvania prisons which had inmates meditate upon their crimes as a key component of rehabilitation. In the 1970s organizations such as the Prison-Ashram Project and SYDA Foundation began programs to offer meditation or yoga instruction to inmates. In subsequent years more religious groups have begun meditation programs, such as the Prison Dharma Network in 1989. Modern meditation programs are thought to help inmates deal with the stress of confinement. One recent study has suggested that such programs help to reduce a host of undesirable and unhealthy behaviors, like drug use, violence and risk taking. Not all prisons allow contemplative programs, leading some to use religious freedom provisions as a way to gain access to the programs. For instance, court actions recognizing Zen Buddhism as an "acceptable religion" have secured meditation programs in New York prisons.

== Traditions ==
=== Protestantism ===
A Pew study found that the 51% of US inmates are Protestant Christians.

=== Catholicism ===
Saint Dismas Prison Ministry
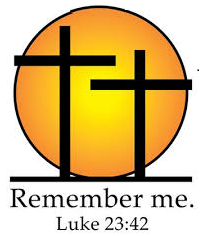
- Established: 2000; 26 years ago
- President: George Williams
- Director: Ron Zeilinger
- Affiliations: Catholic
- Website: dismasministry.org

Saint Dismas Prison Ministry was founded in Milwaukee, Wisconsin, in 2000 to offer spiritual services for Catholic prisoners in the United States. The president is George Williams, a priest.

It was named after Dismas, the repentant thief. The ministry was founded in 2000 by Ron Zeilinger who found no "Catholic organization of a national scope providing Catholic materials”. The ministry distributes bibles to prisoners.

In 2006, Scott Jensen chose to remain on the ministry board after he was forced to leave the Wisconsin State Assembly following a felony conviction that was later overturned.

=== Islam ===
In addition to immigration, the state, federal and local prisons of the United States contribute to the growth of Islam in the country. According to the then Director of the Federal Bureau of Prisons, Harley G. Lappin, not counting members of the Nation of Islam, there were 9,600 Muslim inmates in federal prisons in 2003. However, J. Michael Waller claims that roughly 80% of the prisoners who find faith while in prison convert to Islam and that these converts made up 17–20% (around 350,000) of the total (state and federal) prison population, in 2003.

=== Neopaganism ===
There are a variety of Neopagan practitioners in the prison population many of whom are served by a variety of prison outreach programs. Mattias Gardell indicates that "a pagan revival among the white prison population, including the conversion of whole prison gangs to the ancestral religion." In 2001 there were prison groups associated with Wotansvolk in all states of the nation supporting more than 5000 prisoners. The women's group Sigrdrifa, which has chapters in the United States and Canada, also runs an "Odinism in Prison" project, while the Odinic Rite and the Ásatrú Alliance have prisoner outreach programs as well.

The ability of Neopagans to practice their religion in U.S. prisons has been shaped by the outcome of two significant court cases. In 1985, Virginia prisoner Herbert Daniel Dettmer sued Robert Landon, the Director of the Virginia Department of Corrections, in federal court to get access to objects he claimed were necessary for his Wiccan religious practice. The district court for the Eastern District of Virginia decided in Dettmer's favor, although on appeal, in Dettmer v. Landon the United States Court of Appeals for the Fourth Circuit ruled that while Wicca was a religion, it was not a violation of the First Amendment to keep a religious practitioner from accessing ritual objects. In 2005 Cutter v. Wilkinson came down on the side of at least three Neopagan prison inmates protesting the denial of access to ceremonial items and opportunities for group worship. Yet in their decision the court reinforced the notion that "should inmate requests for religious accommodations become excessive, impose unjustified burdens on other institutionalized persons, or jeopardize an institution's effective functioning, the facility would be free to resist the imposition."

== Relevant court cases ==
- 1964 – Cooper v. Pate
- 1972 – Cruz v. Beto
- 1986 – Dettmer v. Landon
- 1987 – Turner v. Safley
- 1987 – O'Lone v. Estate of Shabazz
- 1997 – City of Boerne v. Flores
- 2005 – Cutter v. Wilkinson
- 2014 – Holt v. Hobbs

== See also ==
- International Network of Prison Ministries
- Religious Freedom Restoration Act
- Religion in the United States
- Prisons in the United States
- Prison Fellowship International
- Prison religion
