= Stephen Donaldson (activist) =

LGBT political activist

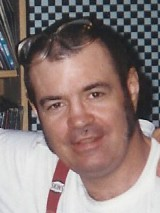
- Stephen Donaldson in July 1995
- Born: Robert Anthony Martin Jr. July 27, 1946; Norfolk, Virginia, United States
- Died: July 18, 1996 (aged 49); New York, New York, United States
- Other names: Donny the Punk, Bob Martin
- Education: Columbia University (BA- Political Science, PhD- Religion)
- Occupation: Political activist

Stephen Donaldson (July 27, 1946 – July 18, 1996), born Robert Anthony Martin Jr. and also known by the pseudonym Donny the Punk, was an American bisexual rights activist, and political activist. He is best known for his pioneering activism in LGBT rights and prison reform, and for his writing about punk rock and subculture.

At Columbia University, he founded the first LGBT college group in the United States, called the Student Homophile League (SHL) (now the Columbia Queer Alliance).

He coined the term "protective pairing".

== Childhood and adolescence (1946–1965) ==
The son of a career naval officer, Donaldson spent his early childhood in different seaport cities in the eastern United States and in Germany. Donaldson later described his father Robert, the son of Italian and German immigrants, as a man who "frowned on display of emotion" and his mother Lois as "an English, Scottish Texan, artistic, free-spirited, emotional, impulsive." After his parents' divorce in 1953, when he was seven years old, Donaldson's mother suffered from acute porphyria (a rare genetic disease), and his father gained custody of Robert and his two brothers. His father remarried several years later.

At age 12, Donaldson was expelled from Boy Scouts for engaging in sexual behavior with other boys (who, as recipients, were not punished). "The disgrace triggered a family crisis, resolved by sending the boy to live in Germany, where he could be watched over by his stepmother's relatives." He attended a boys' boarding school and continued homosexual activity, hiding it from adults.

In April 1962, at age 15, Donaldson returned to the United States to live with his grandparents in West Long Branch, New Jersey. In high school he was the news editor of the school paper, an actor, and a student government officer. He achieved a perfect score on the SAT and graduated as valedictorian. He also became active in politics as a libertarian conservative, supporting Barry Goldwater for president. He "considered joining the Young Americans for Freedom but was so uptight that he first checked with [FBI director] J. Edgar Hoover by letter to inquire whether the YAF was 'a communist organization, communist subverted, or in danger of becoming either' ". Hoover sent back a reply "praising his concern about communism and then opened an FBI file on the boy". Years later, Donaldson received a copy of his FBI file through the Freedom of Information Act.

Donaldson later wrote about his developing sexual identity:

At 18, however, I fell in love with a baseball teammate, and my casual sexual play with boys was transformed into a very serious matter which could dominate my whole life. I talked with a few trusted adults about it, and learned that if I loved another boy I had to be a "homosexual".... I could only find two books on the subject, which confirmed this label, and mentioned the Mattachine Society in New York as an organization of "homosexuals." So on a school expedition to the "wicked city," I slipped away, visited their office, and became a member (swearing I was 21, since Mattachine was deathly afraid of dealing with minors), thus giving my new identity official status.

In 1965, Donaldson went to Florida to spend the summer with his mother. "When Lois discovered young Robert was having an affair with a Cuban man, she decided to punish her son by outing him in letters to her ex-husband and to Columbia University, which Donaldson had planned to attend in the fall." Donaldson moved to New York, where, he later wrote, "The gays of New York welcomed me enthusiastically, offered hospitality, and 'brought me out' as a 'butch' homosexual (in contrast to the "queens"). Among the Mattachine Society members he met were Frank Kameny and Dick Leitsch.

== College years (1965–1970) ==
=== Founding of Student Homophile League ===
==== Motivation ====
In August 1965, Donaldson "had a social worker call the dean's office to ask whether Columbia would register a known homosexual." After a delay of two weeks, the administration responded that he "would be allowed to register, on condition that he undergo psychotherapy and not attempt to seduce other students."

He entered Columbia University that fall and began using the pseudonym Stephen Donaldson so he could be open about his sexuality without embarrassing his father. They both were named Robert Martin, and his father taught mathematics at Rider College in New Jersey. The surname was based on the first name, "Donald", of the baseball teammate who was his first love. His first year of college was difficult: he met no other bisexual students or faculty and had to move from a shared suite to a single room when his suitemates "told the college dean David Truman that they felt uncomfortable living with a homosexual." Apparently ambivalent, they offered Donaldson "great apologies and said they realized they shouldn't feel" unwilling to live with him.

In the summer of 1966, Donaldson began a relationship with gay activist Frank Kameny, who had a great influence on him. Donaldson later wrote:

Frank gave me a complete education both in homosexuality and in the homophile movement, instructing me also in how to respond to attacks from psychiatry, religion, the law, etc., etc. He largely shaped my gay ideology and continued to influence me even after I split with him ideologically in '68–'69.

In August, Kameny took Donaldson to Cherry Grove on Fire Island, where he "was thrilled to meet another gay Columbia student [James Millham] and to learn that Millham lived with his lover, a New York University student, in one of Columbia's dormitories."

==== Struggle with Columbia for charter ====
That fall, Donaldson suggested to Millham "that they form a Mattachine-like organization on campus, what he envisioned as 'the first chapter of a spreading confederation of student homophile groups.' " At first, Donaldson was unable to gain official recognition for the Student Homophile League (SHL; now called the Columbia Queer Alliance), as Columbia required a membership list. Donaldson and Millham were the only homosexual students willing to provide their names. This prevented the group from receiving university funding or holding public events on campus until Donaldson realized that by "recruiting the most prominent student leaders to become pro forma members, he could satisfy the administration without compromising the anonymity of gay students, and Columbia officially chartered the country's first student gay rights group on April 19, 1967," and subsequently the first known LGBT student movement.

==== Publicity and controversy ====
On April 27, 1967, an article about the organization appeared in the student paper, the Columbia Spectator, which students "seemed to think ... was some sort of April Fool hoax." It soon became clear that it was not. The Spectator ran an editorial praising the chartering of the group, and printed letters from students attacking and defending the decision. At this point, there was no apparent opposition from Columbia faculty or staff. The fledgling group was advised by the university chaplain, John D. Cannon, who gave permission for them to hold meetings in his office and later let Donaldson hold office hours there.

Despite having "assured the administration that publicity would be kept to a minimum," Donaldson "launched an aggressive public information campaign about SHL and homosexuality", making sure it was covered on Columbia radio station WKCR, where he was a staff member. He also sent out "at least three press releases to several large newspapers, wire services, and magazines with national and international distribution." The group received little coverage until gay rights supporter Murray Schumach saw the Spectator piece and wrote an article, headlined "Columbia Charters Homosexual Group", which appeared on the front page of The New York Times on May 3, 1967:

The chairman, who used the pseudonym Stephen Donaldson, said in a telephone interview last night that the organization had been formed because "we wanted to get the academic community to support equal rights for homosexuals".... In its declaration of principles, the leagues list 13 points, including ... that "the homosexual is being unjustly, inhumanely and savagely discriminated against by large segments of American society".

The article also quoted Harold E. Love, the chairman of Columbia's Committee on Student Organizations, who said there was no reason to deny the request once they had determined it was a "bona fide student organization." The article noted that "funds were said to have been supplied for the organization by some Columbia alumni who were reported to have learned about it from advertisements in magazines for homosexuals" and that Donaldson said that the group "maintains liaison" with, but is not controlled by, outside homosexual groups. The alumnus supporter was Foster Gunnison Jr., a founding member of the North American Conference of Homophile Organizations, with whom Donaldson had strategized about getting the organization approved. Gunnison "sent the administration a letter of support and made a cash contribution".

Historian David Eisenbach argued in Gay Power: An American Revolution that "much of the SHL's influence grew out of the media attention it attracted.... Within a week [of the New York Times story], media outlets across the country had homed in, with coverage ranging from favorable to neutral to The Gainesville Sun's 'Student Group Seeks Rights for Deviants.' ".

As a result of the publicity, there were "[s]harp [verbal] clashes" between Columbia officials and the SHL. Brett Beemyn wrote about the backlash:

The university was inundated with outraged letters, and the pages of the student newspaper, the Columbia Daily Spectator, were filled with criticism of the decision. The dean of the college called the SHL "quite unnecessary," and the director of the counseling service expressed a concern that the group would promote "deviant behavior" among students. The strong support of the league's advisor, the university chaplain, apparently prevented Columbia officials from revoking the group's charter, but "it was forbidden to serve a social function for fear that this would lead to violations of New York State's sodomy laws."

A surprising source of opposition to Donaldson and the SHL was the Mattachine Society of New York (MSNY), whose president Dick Leitsch "resented the media attention that SHL had generated". With the unanimous support of the board, Leitsch contacted "Frank Hogan, the Manhattan District Attorney and a Member of the Columbia Board of Trustees to advise him on how to undermine SHL." In a letter to Hogan, Leitsch wrote:

The man using the pseudonym Stephen Donaldson is known to me and to the Mattachine Society as an irresponsible, publicity-seeking member of an extremist political group. We have grave doubts as to his sincerity in his stated aim as helping homosexuals, and feel that he may be, instead, a bigoted extremist, interested upon wrecking the homophile movement.

Donaldson was defended by homophile leaders Barbara Gittings, Frank Kameny, and Forest Gunnison.

==== Subsequent chapters and organizations ====
The publicity also led students at other universities to contact Donaldson about starting chapters. In 1968, Donaldson certified SHL chapters at Cornell University, led by Jearld Moldenhauer and advised by radical priest Daniel Berrigan; New York University, headed by Rita Mae Brown; and Stanford University. In 1969, chapters were started at the Massachusetts Institute of Technology by Stan Tillotson, San Francisco State University, and Rutgers University by African American Lionel Cuffie. The University of Massachusetts Amherst gained a chapter in 1970. Other early campus gay groups outside the SHL network included the Boston University Homophile Committee, Fight Repression of Erotic Expression (FREE) at the University of Minnesota, and Homosexuals Intransigent at the City College of New York.

Donaldson was "heavily involved throughout the rest of the 1960s not only as national leader of the Student Homophile League but also as an elected officer of the North American Conference of Homophile Organizations (NACHO) and of its Eastern Regional subsidiary". By 1971, there were an estimated 150 gay student groups at colleges and universities "often with official sanction and with remarkable acceptance from fellow students".

=== Writing career ===
Donaldson began his writing career in college by working summers as a reporter for the Associated Press and The Virginian-Pilot and writing a regular column for the New York newsmagazine Gay Power and occasional reports for The Advocate.

He also worked summers as a legislative intern in the offices of U.S. Representatives Howard H. Callaway (Republican, Georgia) and Donald E. Lukens (Republican, Ohio). Frank Kameny arranged his first internship, which was in the summer of 1966.

In New York, Donaldson funded "his education by working as a hustler, first at the infamous intersection of Fifty-third Street and Third Avenue, then as a call boy through a house. He claimed to have serviced several famous clients, including Rock Hudson and Roy Cohn."

=== Other countercultural activity ===
While at Columbia, Donaldson "experimented with cannabis and LSD" and described himself as "ordained in the psychedelic church," going on to guide first-time LSD users. He wrote that he became a liberal in 1967 in response to the Kerner Report on racism towards blacks in the United States and went on to become a "full-fledged hippy-valued radical." He was arrested twice for participating in anti-war protests at Columbia, including a "liberation" of Columbia president Grayson Kirk's office, spending an uneventful night in jail in 1968.

=== Discomfort with gay liberation movement ===
In 1966, Donaldson fell in love with a woman he met through MENSA, Judith "JD Rabbit" Jones (whom he later considered his "lifetime companion") and began to identify as bisexual. His "growing feeling of discomfort with biphobia in the homophile/gay liberation movement was a major factor" in his deciding to quit the movement and enlist in the Navy after graduating with highest honours from Columbia in 1970.

== Military experience (1970–1972) ==
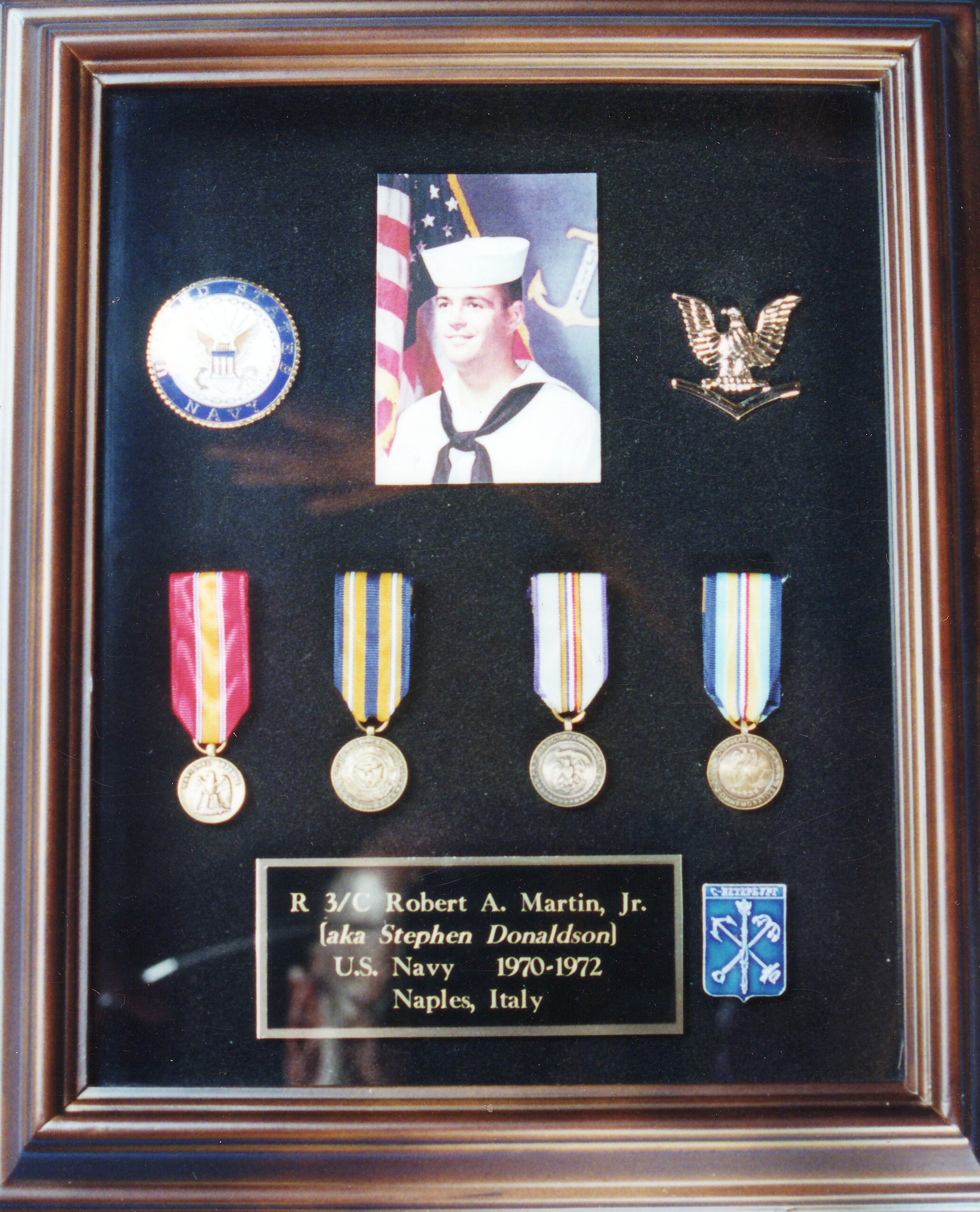
Robert Martin's (Stephen Donaldson's) military portrait, medals, and insignia

Donaldson had a longstanding desire to join the Navy, even buying a sailor's uniform during college, in which he cruised the city and pretended to be a serviceman on a visit to a naval base in Pensacola, Florida, and maintained a "lifelong identification with sailors and seafaring." After graduating from Columbia in 1970, he enlisted and served as a radioman at a NATO base in Italy with an unblemished record until "he wrote to a former shipmate, Terry Fountain, about his latest sexual adventures [with both women and men] at his current home port of Naples, Italy". After Fountain left the letter unattended on his desk, someone turned it over to the Naval Investigative Service, which allegedly coerced Fountain into signing a statement that he had sex with Donaldson, which Fountain later recanted. In 1971, "the Navy announced its intention to release [Donaldson] by General Discharge on grounds of suspected homosexual involvement." As Randy Shilts wrote in Conduct Unbecoming: Gays and Lesbians in the US Military:

In the tens of thousands of hearings since World War II where comparable actions had been taken on the basis of comparable evidence, the matter ended there, with the sailor skulking away in disgrace. Petty Officer Martin, however, went public with what had happened to him and swore to fight for an honorable discharge. What was more, he enlisted some powerful support.

These supporters included six congressional representatives, including New York's Bella Abzug (who called his case a "witch-hunt") and Edward Koch; senators Richard Schweiker of Pennsylvania and Sam Ervin of North Carolina; the president of the American Psychiatric Association (APA), Judd Marmor (who had been "influential in having homosexuality removed from the APA's official list of clinical disorders"); Chief of Naval Operations Admiral Elmo R. Zumwalt Jr.; and the American Civil Liberties Union, which provided a staff attorney to represent him.

Even the dean of Columbia College, Carl Hovde, sent the Navy a letter praising Martin as "a man for whom I have great respect" and making the questionable claim that the young man "never sought controversy."

Despite the support, he received a general discharge in 1972. Donaldson continued to fight, and, in 1977, his discharge was upgraded to "honorable" as part of "President Carter's sweeping amnesty program for Vietnam-era draft evaders, deserters, and service members", at which time:

Martin told Gay Week "what an honorable discharge means to me is that it is the nation's way of saying that it is proud of gay veterans and by extension that it is proud of millions of gay veterans and current service people. We've come a long way."

According to Eisenbach:

Martin's groundbreaking public battle against the Navy kicked off a series of well-publicized challenges to military discharges that harnessed and directed the energy of the gay rights movement in the 1970s.

== Bisexual activism (1972–1977) ==
Donaldson later summarized his military experience and the subsequent transition in his life:

After nearly two years as a sailor, I got kicked out for "homosexual involvement," a charge I received shortly after becoming a Buddhist Quaker and thus a pacifist. Bitter at this second homophobic expulsion, which deprived me of the identity I loved more than any other—that of a sailor—and as a bisexual no longer feeling comfortable with the gay liberation movement, I found myself in June, 1972, attending the annual Friends (Quaker) General Conference (FGC) in Ithaca, New York; its theme for the year was "Where Should Friends Be Pioneering Now?" Contemplating that question, I organized an impromptu workshop on bisexuality and was astonished to find 130 Quakers, one of every ten General Conference attendees, overflowing into five meeting rooms and an auditorium for two days of lively discussion based more on experience than on abstract theories. Finally I was surrounded by bisexually-identified F/friends, formally considering the topic of bisexuality. Thus identity led me to activism.

Donaldson wrote about his experience at the conference later that summer:

The lack of reliable information about bisexuality, homosexuality and sexuality in general was a concern of many of these Friends. Bisexual Friends spoke freely about their conditions and answered many questions. There was agreement that many Friends needed to become much more informed on these subjects and that this could best be accomplished through Monthly and Yearly meetings and at future general conferences.

This group adopted by consensus the "Ithaca Statement on Bisexuality".

The Statement, which may have been "the first public declaration of the bisexual movement" and "was certainly the first statement on bisexuality issued by an American religious assembly," appeared in the Quaker Friends Journal and The Advocate in 1972.

After a series of meetings, the Committee of Friends on Bisexuality was formed, with Donaldson (using the name Bob Martin) as its chair until he left the Quakers in 1977.

Donaldson was involved in the New York bisexual movement in the mid-1970s, for example appearing in 1974 on a New York Gay Activists Alliance panel with Kate Millett. Donaldson propounded the belief that ultimately bisexuality would be perceived as much more threatening to the prevailing sexual order than homosexuality, because it potentially subverted everyone's identity (the idea that everyone is potentially bisexual was widespread) and could not, unlike exclusive homosexuality, be confined to a segregated, stigmatized and therefore manageable ghetto.

He and bisexual activist Brenda Howard and gay activist L. Craig Schoonmaker are credited with popularizing the word "Pride" to describe LGBT Pride celebrations that are now held around the world every June.

== Washington jail experiences and aftermath (1973) ==
=== Demonstrations and incarcerations ===
After being discharged from the Navy in 1972, Donaldson moved to Washington, D.C., where he "worked as Pentagon correspondent for the Overseas Weekly, a privately owned newspaper distributed to American servicemen stationed in Europe". Donaldson considered himself a Quaker and took part in the Langley Hill Monthly Meeting, where he was part of a group influenced by "a series of pray-ins at the White House sponsored by the Community for Creative Non-Violence (CCNV)" who felt a call to "hold a memorial meeting for worship at the White House to commemorate the nuclear bombing of Nagasaki [on its 28th anniversary] and for the victims of all wars and violence" on August 9, 1973. The protesters (referred to as the "White House Seven") were arrested for unlawful entry and released on bail except for Donaldson, who refused and spent the night in the D.C. jail before being released by a judge the next morning. On August 14 Donaldson was one of 66 demonstrators (including Daniel Berrigan) who took part in a CCNV-sponsored pray-in at the White House protesting the bombing of Cambodia, where he was again arrested. Donaldson again refused to post bail. In a 1974 account under the pseudonym Donald Tucker, he explained:

I also was protesting against the bail system, under which the privileged, the white, the middle class escape the pre-trial confinements which go automatically to the poor and black. In good conscience I could not take advantage of the privileges available to me. Even in jail, however, I could not escape those privileges. I was sent directly to cell block four, third floor — the privileged area where I could and did play chess with Gordon Liddy, where one-man rooms for 45 respectable prisoners were never locked.

Liddy wrote in his autobiography that he heard that Donaldson worked for The Washington Post, suspected him of being in prison "to try to steal a march[(?)]" on Woodward and Bernstein by getting a first hand story", and expressed the wish that he be transferred elsewhere.

However, Donaldson himself in "The Punk Who Wouldn't Shut Up", states that guard captain Clinton Cobb had him moved to the most dangerous cell-block in the prison and his subsequent rapes arranged as he believed him to be writing a piece on prison corruption for The Washington Post. On signing in, he had naively and honestly listed his profession as 'Journalist'.

That night, Donaldson was lured into a cell by a prisoner who claimed that he and his friends wanted to 'discuss pacifism' with him in their cells. He was then anally and orally raped dozens of times by an estimated 45 male inmates. He suffered additional abuse a second night before he escaped from his tormentors (two of whom were pimping him to the others for cigarettes) and collapsed at the cell block gate where guards retrieved him. After a midnight examination at D.C. General Hospital (during which he remained handcuffed) he was returned to the jail hospital, untreated either for physical injury or emotional trauma.

Donaldson later claimed that the guards told him he'd been deliberately set up by Captain Cobb. The following morning, Lucy Witt posted his bond and took him to a doctor.

=== Publicity and hearings ===
On August 24 the next day, Donaldson held a press conference, becoming the first male prison-rape victim to publicly recount his experiences; this resulted in "massive and prolonged" publicity (under his legal name, Robert Martin). All three Washington newspapers carried lengthy stories; newspapers from Hartford to Miami picked it up from wire services, and all three network-affiliated TV stations carried filmed interviews.

One television station and one newspaper carried editorials. Under the headline "Nightmares at D.C. Jail," the Star-News wrote: "....It is particularly ironic that the victim of this latest nightmare chose to go to the jail rather than post collateral because he 'wanted to understand at an experience level what the prison system is all about.' He survived the lesson but only just. And being a man of uncommon understanding, he may also survive its after-effects."

On August 28 Donaldson met with attorney William Schaffer, who agreed to represent him in a possible civil suit against the D.C. Department of Corrections with the goal of pressuring officials to make major improvements to the jail system. Donaldson wrote the following year about this "time of agony":

I was faced with an awful decision: to cooperate in the prosecution of the two young inmates who had led the rapes, to bring suit against the Corrections Department, or to drop out of the legal process.

The prospect of giving my assailants a still longer prison term went contrary to [my deep convictions]. Yet many who were working to change the penal system felt that the first prosecution of a prison rape case would set a significant precedent and have a real deterrent effect on such situations in the future.

Bill Schaffer was advising me that the civil suit would be considerably handicapped if I did not go through with prosecution of the inmates. He was confident of winning such a suit, but warned me that the government would probably defend itself outside the court by launching a smear campaign in the press against me and those close to me....

Torn between my rigid principles and my private pain, I spent weeks in hell trying to come to a decision.

After deliberations with the Langley Hill Meeting, Donaldson decided on October 20 not to file a civil suit and not to cooperate with the grand jury inquiry into a criminal suit against his attackers.

=== Trial outcomes ===
Donaldson and the rest of the White House Seven defended themselves against the August 9 charge of illegal entry; they were found guilty and sentenced on September 26 to "the choice of $25 or five days in jail or a one-year unsupervised probation conditional on a promise not to violate any local, state or federal law during that period". Donaldson rejected the probation outright. "I cannot promise to abide by all the laws of the United States", he said, "because if there is an unjust law that has to be broken to further divine purposes, I will break it".

At first Donaldson chose to go to jail rather than pay the fine, which he viewed as cooperating with the government. He changed his mind after finding out he would be returned to the same jail in Washington, D.C. He regretfully said: "My conscience tells me I should have gone (to jail), but I was shaking all over. It was obvious I just couldn't go through it again. I couldn't go back."

As for the August 14 charge which led to his traumatic imprisonment, Donaldson refused to plead (unlike most of those arrested, who pleaded no contest) and went to trial alone on September 28. Representing himself, Donaldson testified on legal, moral and religious issues (including an explanation of karma and of silent meditation). When the jury returned a not guilty verdict on October 1, there was much rejoicing in the small courtroom.

=== Effect on Donaldson ===
The injuries to Donaldson's rectum were so severe that they required surgery, and he had to spend a week in the Washington D.C. Veterans' Hospital. He later said: "The government sewed up the tears in my rectum which the government occasioned."

In a 1974 account in the Friends Journal, Donaldson asked:

Why was I called to such suffering? What did it accomplish? How can God lead me into such evil?....The damage for which I call the Lord most to account is that which has undermined my capacity for trust in human beings, for tenderness, for love; that which has ruptured my integrity and my hopes for more open, honest relationships with my fellow human beings. These are losses which, a part of me wants to say, no God has a right to demand.

In 1982, Donaldson wrote about his lack of success in getting needed psychological counseling after the rapes:

When I requested psychological counseling of some type at a meeting of a Quaker committee, I was referred to a lay counseling program that was no help at all; what I really needed was heavy-duty psychotherapy. After enrolling in a local college, I met with their counseling service, but they also failed to recommend a program of treatment. It seems astonishing today, but nobody ever raised the question of whether the trauma of gang-rape was being adequately treated. The result was no treatment at all. A great deal of my emotional reaction was immediately suppressed.

Donaldson wrote that he was aided in his sexual recovery by an understanding woman who helped him regain his confidence. After a year and a half, he returned to his prior level of sexual activity. In 1975, "the suppressed emotions began to rise to the level of consciousness, primarily in the form of anger, aggression, and a vigorous reassertion of [his] own masculinity," leading him to join a male consciousness raising group and then, in 1976, to pursue "individual Gestalt therapy (not being able to afford anything else) with a lay therapist."

From 1974 to 1977 Donaldson did graduate work in religion at Columbia University, and served as Chairman of the Student Governing Board of the Earl Hall Center for Religion and Life. In May 1976 he was ordained as a novice monk in the orthodox (Theravada) Buddhist Order. During the late-1970s Donaldson worked intermittently as a developer of war simulation games for SPI in New York and immersed himself in New York's punk rock subculture, centered on the CBGB nightclub in downtown Manhattan. Several personal tragedies, including the 1976 suicide of his mother, contributed to bouts of psychological depression.

== Subsequent arrests and incarcerations (1976–1990) ==
=== Acceptance of "punk" role (1976) ===
While traveling to Florida for his mother's funeral in late 1976, Donaldson was arrested after urinating in a motel parking lot, then was charged with possession after the police searched his hotel room and found cannabis. He was placed in a small cell block with four white and eight black prisoners, most of them Marines from a nearby base, who demanded sexual services. Donaldson later wrote:

Not wishing to repeat the battering I got in the D.C. Jail, I capitulated....I considered myself lucky that the blocks were so small....The next day the four white marines came up to me and said, "You're moving in with us!" and so I became the fifth occupant of the four-bunk cell.... I had become the Punk of these four lads, who in jail lingo became my Men....They provided me with protection and such things as stamps and snacks, in return wanting blowjobs (from three) and ass (in jail called "pussy") from one.

Donaldson was pleasantly surprised that they treated him not with the contempt he expected but with genuine warmth and affection. Grateful for their kindness and protection, Donaldson decided to embrace his role as "punk" and do his best to keep his men happy.

After the black prisoners fought the white Marines over him, Donaldson was placed in solitary confinement, where he remained until his bail was posted. Donaldson was defended against the possession charge by the chief counsel of the state chapter of the American Civil Liberties Union. The case was thrown out due to unconstitutional police behavior.

=== Adoption of jailhouse attitudes (1977) ===
In the spring of 1977, Donaldson became depressed enough to cut his wrist and arranged to get himself arrested for sale of LSD in Norfolk, Virginia, with the hope, he later wrote, "to find myself being wanted and needed, to find the warm security I had experienced with the marines in the county jail." Donaldson was placed in the city jail, where he was gang-raped nightly until the guards were alerted and he was put in solitary confinement for his protection (to which Donaldson vigorously objected, believing the loss of rights and privileges unfair). After being released into a cell with blacks (who had allegedly paid $5 to receive him), Donaldson was again raped and "paralyzed with terror, the emotions of D.C. Jail overwhelming [him]", he fought his assailant, for which he was returned to solitary. After being released into a white cell, he was greeted: "Why, it's Donny the Punk!", giving him his nickname.

Donaldson experienced another mental shift:

Under the impact of rape, battery and robbery in this jail I came to abandon my Quaker belief in pacifism; my depression gradually changed to anger at the jail and the government in general. This was a turning point in my consciousness; I came to think of myself as an outlaw and began to adopt jailhouse attitudes. Eventually I accepted my identity as a punk and decided to make the best of it.

Donaldson was eventually claimed by a cellmate, Terry, who treated him with kindness. The two had a cell to themselves when a frightened newcomer was moved in and, with Terry's consent, Donaldson decided to emotionally manipulate the newcomer into becoming his own punk. Donaldson wrote:

I had some misgivings about all this, but I told myself that I was really being good to him and meeting his emotional needs, had not used real violence or threatened him, etc. For the most part, the exhilaration of demonstrating my masculinity, of conquest, of sexual release swept those reservations aside. Somewhere deep in my soul, I suppose, there lurks a jailhouse rapist.

After several months, Donaldson's case was dropped by the prosecution after the arresting officer's suicide. Donaldson wrote:

Unemployed, I used my time to explore the meanings of my new identity as a punk. I became heavily involved in the punk rock subculture, discovering in the aggressive defiance of the punk rockers an outlet for my own anger, and in their vulnerability, only partially obscured by their "tough boy" image, a reflection of my own feelings. Trying to look and act strong, I first took to wearing a marine combat knife, then acquired a gun.

=== The darkness on the edge of society (1980–1984) ===
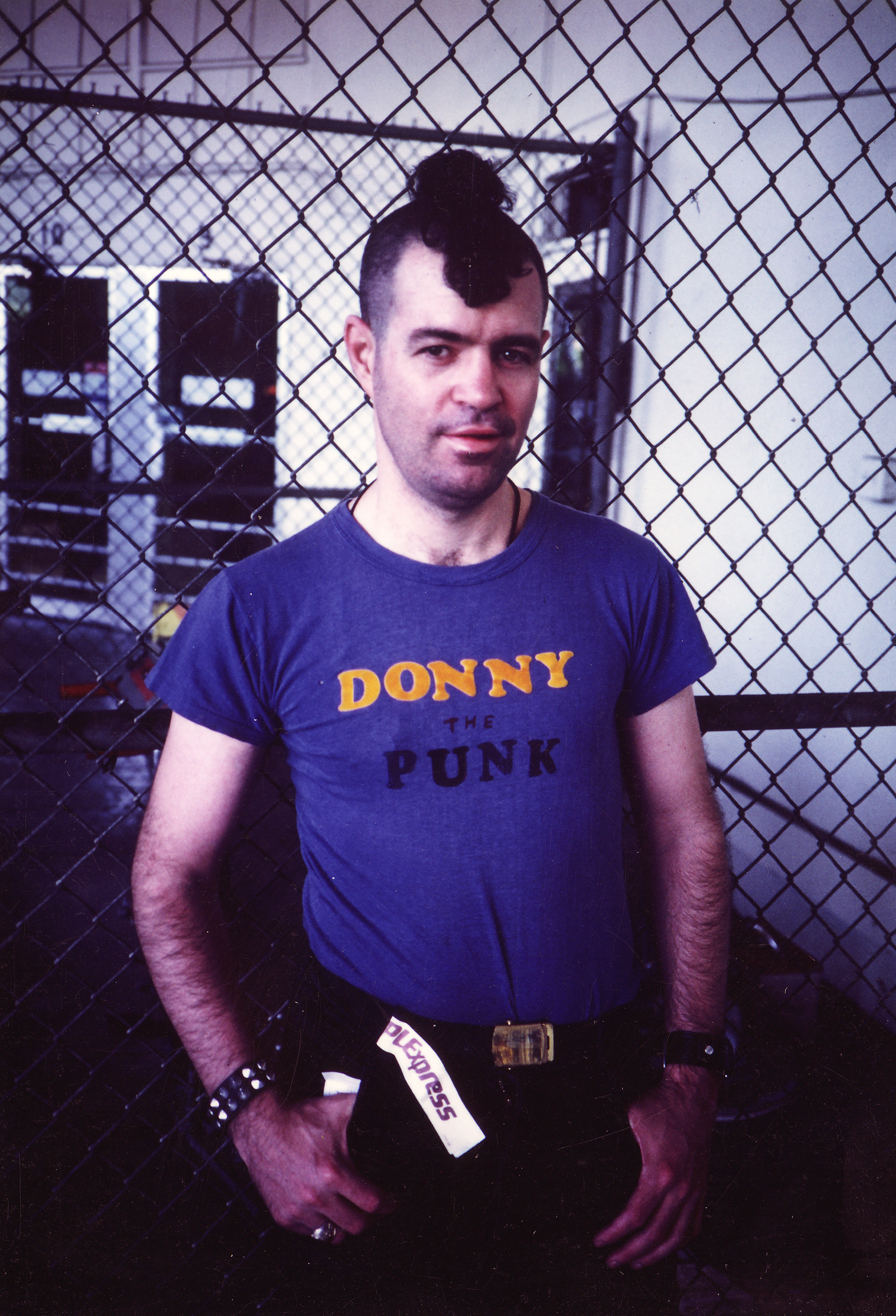
Stephen Donaldson, July 1984

Donaldson continued to suffer from depression, insomnia, and panic attacks in the late 1970s, and attempted suicide in 1977, the year after the suicide of his mother Lois Vaugahn. In 1980, Donaldson "hit rock bottom" and committed a semi-deranged incident at a Veterans' Hospital in the Bronx. Having been denied treatment after a half-day wait and asked to come back the following day, Donaldson returned with a gun and fired it through a window. During the subsequent trial, Donaldson heavily criticized the United States Government's policies. The judge ultimately found him guilty.

Although nobody was hurt, Donaldson was convicted of assault with intent to commit murder and sentenced to ten years in federal prison. He was guilty of counts 1–6, "Unlawfully, willfully and knowingly within the special maritime and territorial jurisdiction of the United States did seize, confine, inveigle, decoy, kidnap and abduct and hold for ransom and reward and otherwise a person and did commit assault with intent to commit murder, in that while at a Hospital".

In a 1982 essay written from jail, Donaldson described the event:

At the beginning of 1980, circumstances arose which produced in me an overwhelming feeling of powerlessness, helplessness, of not being recognized as a human being but rather being treated in purely bureaucratic terms by a government agency to which I had turned in vain with an urgent need for help.

I felt that my masculinity was at stake, that I had to regain control of the situation or go under trying. As the Bruce Springsteen song goes, "Sometimes I feel so weak I just want to explode...." These feelings are directly related to my D.C. experience, the subconscious emotions that are dredged up when I feel completely vulnerable. In this state I went out with a gun and violently confronted the government, though without injuring anyone. I knew I would be going back to jail for it, and this was probably a major factor as well in determining my action. It was in jail that I felt I knew the rules and could find security, a means of coping with my helplessness. The jail Punk in me was looking for a way home, even as the man in me was striking back, by force of arms assuming control of the situation, returning the government some of the rape it had given me.

Having accomplished my objective, I surrendered to the police and was led away once more to the darkness on the edge of society, to the "darkness on the edge of town" that Springsteen sings about.

Less than a year into his term, Donaldson had been "raped once, assaulted once, and claimed by five different men" in jail and was fearing his upcoming transfer to his first maximum security prison, where he went on to spend over a year in protective custody, which he described as "a solitary retreat" in a letter to Bo Lozoff. Lozoff was leader of the Prison-Ashram Project, which encourages convicts to use their prisons as ashrams (religious retreats) for spiritual growth. In their correspondence, Donaldson expressed his desire to help other victims but lamented that:

Writing and working on the rape question and the enslavement of punks (and gays) poses a major dilemma for my own spiritual work...[because] everything I do in it reinforces my own identity as a punk, since I am speaking out of experience.... Perhaps one reason why I work to help other punks in transcending their punk identity, is that the destructive results of assuming that identity are all too manifest in my own life—where the identity has become so firmly attached as to be part of my own name, "Donny the Punk". Oh physician, how to heal thyself?

Donaldson was released on parole in April 1984 and returned to New York City. During the 1980s-90s, Donaldson volunteered as a counselor to male victims of sexual assault, and spoke out publicly in a wide variety of forums on the issue of prisoner rape. In 1987-88 he visited India for religious study and was there initiated in the Veerashaiva tradition of Shaivite Hinduism. This trip constituted a parole violation, and resulted in another term in federal prison during 1990. In 1992 Donaldson visited Europe to meet punk rock musicians and fans and to lecture on the American punk scene. Throughout this period he advanced his career as an editor and writer. His short essays on such topics as punk rock, prison conditions, Buddhism and sexuality appeared in numerous magazines and underground publications.

== Stop Prisoner Rape ==
Through Bo Lozoff, Donaldson met Tom Cahill, whose correspondence with Lozoff also appeared in We're All Doing Time. Cahill was "an Air Force veteran turned peace activist when [he] was jailed for civil disobedience in San Antonio, Texas in 1968. For the first twenty-four hours, [he] was beaten, gang-raped and otherwise tortured", allegedly as part of the Federal Bureau of Investigation's Counter Intelligence Program (COINTELPRO) due to Cahill's anti-Vietnam War activity.

Around 1983, Cahill resurrected the defunct organization "People Organized to Stop Rape of Imprisoned Persons" (POSRIP), which had been founded in 1980 by Russell Smith. In 2004, Cahill recollected:

When Donny and I connected in 1985, he agreed to be president and I became director. Even though at the time I lived under a leaky camper shell on the back of an old, beat-up pick-up truck on the streets of San Francisco, I was a little more stable than he was. So we used my post office box and telephone message service. With Donny in New York and me on the "Left" Coast, we were voices in the wilderness trying to spotlight a serious, massive crime in progress.

Donaldson became president of Stop Prisoner Rape, Inc. (SPR), which he and Cahill incorporated in the mid-1990s from POSRIP. The organization (since 2008 known as Just Detention International) helps prisoners deal with the psychological and physical trauma of rape, and works to prevent rape from happening. Donaldson was perhaps the first activist against male rape in the United States to gain significant media attention. Writing on behalf of SPR, he appeared on the Op-Ed page of The New York Times, as well as in other major media. He testified on behalf of the American Civil Liberties Union in its case Reno v. American Civil Liberties Union, which went to the U.S. Supreme Court.

== Activism and writing ==
As "Donny the Punk", Donaldson was already a respected writer and personality in the punk and anti-racist skinhead subcultures. He had published in punk zines such as Maximumrocknroll, Flipside and J.D.s. In the mid-1980s, Donny was the chief organizer of The Alternative Press & Radio Council (APRC), which brought together members of the punk community (such as fanzine editors and college radio DJs) from New York City, New Jersey, and Connecticut.

This co-operative group met on Sundays before the weekly CBGB Sunday hardcore matinees and organized several benefit concerts. The group published a newsletter, and released a compilation LP on Mystic Records in 1986, which was entitled Mutiny On The Bowery. The compilation featured live recordings from the group's benefit concerts. Among other active members of the APRC were WFMU-FM DJ Pat Duncan, Maximumrocknroll columnist Mykel Board and Jersey Beat editor Jim Testa.

Donaldson was associate editor of the Encyclopedia of Homosexuality (Garland Publishing, 1990). He was editor-in-chief of a concise edition of the encyclopedia, which remains unpublished.

== Legacy and honors ==
Donaldson died of a bronchial infection in 1996 at the age of 49. He was HIV-positive at the time.

After Donaldson's death, the Columbia Queer Alliance renamed its student lounge in his honor. SPR continued to work for prisoners' rights. It contributed to gaining the passage of the first US law against rape in prison Prison Rape Elimination Act of 2003. The issue of rape and prisoners' rights continues to receive national and state attention.

== See also ==
- Sexual orientation and the United States military
- T. J. Parsell
