= Celtic religion =

Celtic religion may refer to:

- Ancient Celtic religion
  - Druidry
- Celtic Christianity
  - Celtic Orthodox Church
  - Celtic Rite
- Celtic neopaganism
  - Celtic Wicca
  - Druidry (modern)
