= Jenny Phillips =

American documentary filmmaker (1942-2018)

Jenny King Phillips
- Born: Jane Morton King; May 29, 1942; New York City, US
- Died: July 9, 2018 (age 76); Wauwinet, Massachusetts, US
- Occupation: Documentary filmmaker
- Known for: directing The Dhamma Brothers and Beyond the Wall
- Spouse: Frank Phillps
- Children: Mary “Polly” Phillips Gilbert, Maxwell Perkins Phillips
- Relatives: Maxwell Perkins Perry King

Jenny Phillips (May 29, 1942 – July 9, 2018) was an American documentary filmmaker. She produced many films, including The Dhamma Brothers and Beyond the Wall. She was a psychotherapist and had family therapy practice in Concord, MA. She drowned in Wauwinet, Massachusetts on July 9, 2018, age 76.

== Career ==
Phillips had a doctorate in anthropology and two master's degrees from Boston University. She had been a family therapist for over 25 years. She also worked with male prisoners. Phillips taught inmates Vipassanā Meditation and emotional literacy.

== Hemingway letters ==
During a 2001 trip to Cuba, Phillips asked to see letters between Ernest Hemingway and her grandfather, Maxwell Perkins, Hemingway's editor and friend. Both Phillips and her husband worked to make the Hemingway documents available to the public. A digital collection of Hemingway's documents were eventually brought to the JFK Library in Dorchester, Massachusetts. Due to her efforts to make the letters public, she eventually met Fidel Castro.

== Personal life ==
Phillips married her husband, Frank, on December 18, 1966. They had met each other during an orientation for a college overseas program in 1964. They had lost touch with each other until they reconnected during Dr. Martin Luther King Jr.'s march from Selma to Montgomery, Alabama. They had two children, Polly Phillips Gilbert and Maxwell Perkins Phillips, and two grandchildren. The Phillips' were residents of Concord, Massachusetts for almost 50 years.

== Death ==
Phillips, her husband, and a friend were sailing in Nantucket on July 9, 2018, when she decided to swim the quarter-mile or so back to shore. As she was a strong swimmer, Jenny often leaped into the waves on the way home, but this time she apparently drowned and was found later along the shore of the island's Wauwinet area.
