= Maurice King =

Maurice King may refer to:

- Maurice King (basketball) (1935–2007), American basketball player
- Maurice King (lawyer) (1936–2021), Barbadian lawyer
- Maurice King (producer) (1914–1977), co-founder of King Brothers Productions
- Maurice King (doctor), board member of the Benevolent Organisation for Development, Health and Insight
- Maurice King (chemist), founder of King Research and inventor of Barbicide
- Maurice King (musician) (né Clarence Maurice King, Sr.; 1911–1992), mid-20th-century American jazz musician, member of the International Sweethearts of Rhythm and later Maurice King's Wolverines
- Maurice King (weightlifter), mid-20th century Saint Vincentian weightlifter
