= Stephen Donaldson =

Stephen Donaldson may refer to:

- Stephen R. Donaldson (born 1947), author
- Stephen Donaldson (activist) (1946–1996), LGBT activist
- James Stephen Donaldson or MrBeast (born 1998), American YouTuber
