= Buddhist Peace Fellowship =

International Buddhist network

The Buddhist Peace Fellowship (BPF) is a nonsectarian international network of engaged Buddhists participating in various forms of non-violent social activism and environmentalism. The non-profit BPF is an affiliate of the international Fellowship of Reconciliation working toward global disarmament and peace, helping individuals suffering under governmental tyranny in places such as Burma, Bangladesh, Tibet and Vietnam. Headquartered in Oakland, California, BPF was incorporated in 1978 in Hawaii by Robert Baker Aitken, his wife Anne Hopkins Aitken, Nelson Foster, Ryo Imamura and others. Shortly after other notable individuals joined, including Gary Snyder, Alfred Bloom, Joanna Macy, and Jack Kornfield. Generally speaking, the BPF has a tendency to approach social issues from a left-wing perspective and, while the fellowship is nonsectarian, the majority of its members are practitioners of Zen Buddhism.

BPF's work includes:

1. Sparking conversation at the intersection of Buddhism and social justice;
2. Training Buddhist political activists;
3. Mobilizing people to action from a Buddhist perspective;
4. Building a network of radical Buddhist activists.

BPF is led by Interim Director Sarwang Parikh and a national board of five individuals.

== About ==
The Buddhist Peace Fellowship is a grassroots movement established in 1978 by Robert Baker Aitken and Anne Hopkins Aitken, along with Nelson Foster and others, on the front porch of their Maui Zendo in Hawaii. Sitting around a table, the assembled group discussed nuclear weapons and militarism within the United States in the years following the Vietnam War, finding that these issues must be addressed with compassion from a Buddhist perspective in order to bring about peace. Original members were centered primarily in Hawaii or the San Francisco Bay Area, and by 1979 the group had roughly fifty members. To stay connected, the group formulated a newsletter spearheaded by Nelson Foster which evolved into Turning Wheel—the quarterly magazine published by the BPF. Today, Turning Wheel Media is an online home for activists and thinkers, writers and readers, a place to bring Buddhist teachings into conversation with the world. By the late 1980s the association had hundreds of members, and the headquarters had moved to office space in Berkeley, California. During this time much of their work was geared toward human rights efforts in areas of the world such as Cambodia, Vietnam and Bangladesh, working particularly hard at freeing Buddhist prisoners of the Unified Buddhist Church of Vietnam. This period in BPF history also was marked by the hiring of a coordinator and the development of national chapters.

BPF went through a turbulent period after longtime executive director Alan Senauke left at the end of 2001. After two executive directors who served less than a year and a period of no clear leadership, board member Maia Duerr was asked to lead the organisation in 2004. During her three-year tenure, the BPF stabilised its finances, and considerable effort were made to bolster its nationwide outreach and include chapters in decision-making processes. Also during this period, Duerr led two "Buddhist Peace Delegations" to Washington, D.C., to call for an end to war in Iraq. Since 2012, Co-Directors Katie Loncke and Dawn Haney have supported the organisation's "Radical Rebirth" as one focused on present-day issues of racial justice, climate change, and militarisation. Haney left the organization in 2019 and Loncke left in 2021; it is now stewarded by Interim Director Sarwang Parikh.

The Buddhist Peace Fellowship appeals to Westerners who have embraced Buddhism and who also believe that their chosen path must address the pressing issues of the day. More a religious movement than a political one, the BPF is fuelled by an expressed need to modify or extend traditional spiritual practice.

—Kraft, Kenneth (1992). Inner Peace, World Peace: Essays on Buddhism and Nonviolence. pp. 23–24. OCLC 23462459.

Many individual activists from different traditions network through the Buddhist Peace Fellowship (BPF), an organisation that facilitates individual and group social engagement in the United States and Asia and often works together with the International Network of Engaged Buddhists (INEB). The BPF is the largest and most effective of the engaged Buddhist networks.

—Jones, Ken (2003). The New Social Face of Buddhism: A Call to Action. pp. 201–202.

== Current projects ==
=== Turning Wheel Media ===
Turning Wheel Media is the online version of BPF's award-winning magazine, Turning Wheel. It provides a platform for lively debate, lifts up Buddhist perspectives on current events, guides inspired readers to groups already taking action, and brings Buddhist teachings into conversation with the world.

=== The System Stinks: Curriculum for Buddhist Activists ===
Designed to help promote collective liberation and subvert the highly individualistic bent of much mainstream dharma these days, in 2013 Buddhist Peace Fellowship began offering The System Stinks — a collection of Buddhist social justice media named for the favourite protest sign of one of BPF's founders, Robert Aitken, Roshi. In 2013, the curriculum covered a systemic take on The Five Precepts - violence, theft, sexual misconduct, lying, and intoxication. In 2014, The System Stinks reviewed the Buddha's core teachings on The Four Noble Truths, from seasoned practitioners like Mushim Ikeda, Maia Duerr, Zenju Earthlyn Manuel, and Alan Senauke, as well as newcomers like Funie Hsu and Faith Adiele. Starting in 2015, The System Stinks will cover teachings on The Three Dharma Seals - impermanence, non-self, and liberation.

== Former projects ==
=== Buddhist Alliance for Social Engagement ===
The Buddhist Alliance for Social Engagement (BASE) is an extension of the Buddhist Peace Fellowship established in 1995, offering training and internship programs based on the model set forward by the Jesuit Volunteer Corps for social workers, activists and human service workers. It has chapters in various cities in the United States, including Berkeley, California, and Boston, Massachusetts, aiming to help professionals integrate their work with Buddhist practice. The idea behind BASE was originally conceived of by Robert Baker Aitken during discussions at a BPF meeting held in Oakland, California, in 1992, although it was Diana Winston who ultimately saw this vision through. She was somewhat disheartened to find that many of the BPF members were not actively engaged in meditation, so she set out to develop a "training program that would integrate Buddhist practice, social engagement, and community life into one organic whole."

BASE is meant to provide for lay American Buddhists the kind of institutional support for the cultivation of socially engaged Buddhism available to Asian monks and nuns who are part of a monastic sangha. But it is also inspired by the BASE community of Latin America, which was founded in the 1970s as a vehicle for Catholic liberation theology...BASE emphasised social engagement as a path of Buddhist practice, not simply as a mode of Buddhist social service.

—Seager, Richard Hughes (1999). Buddhism in America. pp. 207–208. OCLC 40481142.

BASE participants combine weekly meetings for meditation and study with fifteen to thirty hours a week working in hospices, homeless shelters, prisons, medical clinics, and activist organizations.

—Coleman, James William (2002). The New Buddhism: The Western Transformation of an Ancient Tradition. p. 18.

=== Buddhist Peace Fellowship Prison Project ===
Another outgrowth of the BPF is the Buddhist Peace Fellowship Prison Project, a committee within BPF which works with prisoners and their families and other religious groups in an effort to address violence within the criminal justice system. They oppose the implementation of capital punishment and also offer prisons information on chaplaincy opportunities. The committee's founding director was Diana Lion, who also has served as associate director of the Buddhist Peace Fellowship.

...the BPF Prison project...is attempting to transform the prison system through reforming the prison-industrial complex, abolishing the death penalty, and bringing the teachings of "dharma" to those persons confined in prisons and jails...

—Barak, Gregg (2003). Violence and Nonviolence: Pathways to Understanding. p. 287. OCLC 51242196.

=== Buddhist AIDS Project ===
In 1993 the Buddhist AIDS Project (BAP), based in San Francisco, California, was founded, a non-profit affiliate of the BPF run entirely by volunteers, serving individuals with HIV/AIDS, those who are HIV positive, their families, and their caregivers.

== Activist activities ==
On Hiroshima Day of August 6, 2005, the Tampa, Florida chapter of BPF organised The Hiroshima Memorial in conjunction with Pax Christi, designed to raise consciousness about the issue of nuclear war. The two groups released "peace lanterns" into the air and participants held vigils and various talks. On Hiroshima Day of August 6, 2006, the Buddhist Peace Fellowship of Santa Cruz, California, used the occasion to protest the Iraq War. Participants of the group "displayed a three foot tall, hundred foot long, scroll listing 40,000 names of Iraqi civilians killed in the war. There was also a pair of booths created which listed the names, photos, and brief stories, of over 2,000 US and coalition soldiers who also died in the war."

In October 2007 the Milwaukee chapter of BPF organised a silent "lakefront demonstration" to lend their support to the Buddhists of Myanmar protesting the oppression of the military junta there. Plans were made to sneak photographs and information on the Milwaukee event into Myanmar, to let protesters know that there are outsiders standing with them in solidarity. Some members reported being told that their phones were likely bugged in the United States.

== See also ==
- Benevolent Organisation for Development, Health and Insight
- Buddhist Global Relief
- Dalit Buddhist movement
- Doing Time, Doing Vipassana
- Engaged Buddhism
- Fellowship of Reconciliation
- International Network of Engaged Buddhists
- List of anti-war organizations
- List of peace activists
- Order of Interbeing
- The Dhamma Brothers
- Tzu Chi
- Zen Peacemakers
