= Exodus Ministries =

Exodus Ministries is a Dallas, Texas-based non-denominational Christian former prisoner rehabilitation organization, which attempts to help those who are released from prison back into society at large. The organization is not affiliated with Exodus International, a now defunct ex-gay organization.

== Focus of the organization ==
Their primary focus, as described on the group's website, is "to assist ex-offenders and their families become productive members of society by meeting both their spiritual and physical needs." Exodus Ministries claims three primary objectives: reducing the number of ex-offenders who become homeless and unemployed, as well as the number of those who return to a life of crime and eventually end up back in prison; helping ex-offenders obtain employment and managing their finances so they can re-establish a positive, self-sufficient lifestyle; and reuniting ex-offenders with their families and teaching them the life skills necessary for daily living through counseling and training services. In at least one notable case in 1996, Exodus Ministries rendered assistance to a non-ex-offender in need.

== Funding and support ==
Exodus Ministries is supported by local churches and non-profit foundations.

Exodus garnered some national attention in October 2005 when it was announced that United States Supreme Court nominee Harriet Miers once served on the board of the organization.

== See also ==
- Prison religion
