= International Network of Engaged Buddhists =

World-wide Buddhist humanitarian network

- Established: 1989
- Founders: Sulak Sivaraksa and other Buddhists
- Website: inebnetwork.org

The International Network of Engaged Buddhists (INEB) is an organization that connects engaged Buddhists from around the world with the aim of addressing with environmental concerns, human rights, and conflict resolution. It was established in February 1989 by Sulak Sivaraksa and has members in about 20 countries around the world, mostly in Asia, but also in the US, Australia and Europe. Its members include monks, nuns, activists, academics and social workers. While it is a Buddhist organization some of its members come from other spiritual traditions and interfaith activities are part of its program. INEB holds an international conference of its members once every two years.

== Partners ==
=== East Asia ===
==== Japan ====
- Japanese Network of Engaged Buddhists (JNEB)
- JIPPO
- International Buddhist Exchange Center

==== South Korea ====
- Jungto Society
- Buddhist Solidarity for Reform (BSR)

==== Taiwan ====
- Fo Guang University working group
- Buddhist Hong-Shi College working group

=== Southeast Asia ===
==== Cambodia ====
- Buddhists and Khmer Society Network
- Khmer Youth Association
- Dhammayetra

==== Indonesia ====
- Hikmahbudhi
- Dhammajala

==== Laos ====
- Lao Buddhism for Development
- Participatory Development Training Center

==== Malaysia ====
- Buddhist Missionary Society

==== Myanmar ====
- Buddhist Youth Empowerment Program
- Alternative Education for Social Engagement
- Phaung Daw Oo Monastic School
- Mon Women Organization
- Sasana Moli

==== Singapore ====
- (Individual activists)

==== Thailand ====
- Sathirakoses-Nagapradipa Foundation
- Spirit in Education Movement
- Buddhika
- Bhukkuni Thai Institute
- International Women's Partnership for Peace and Justice
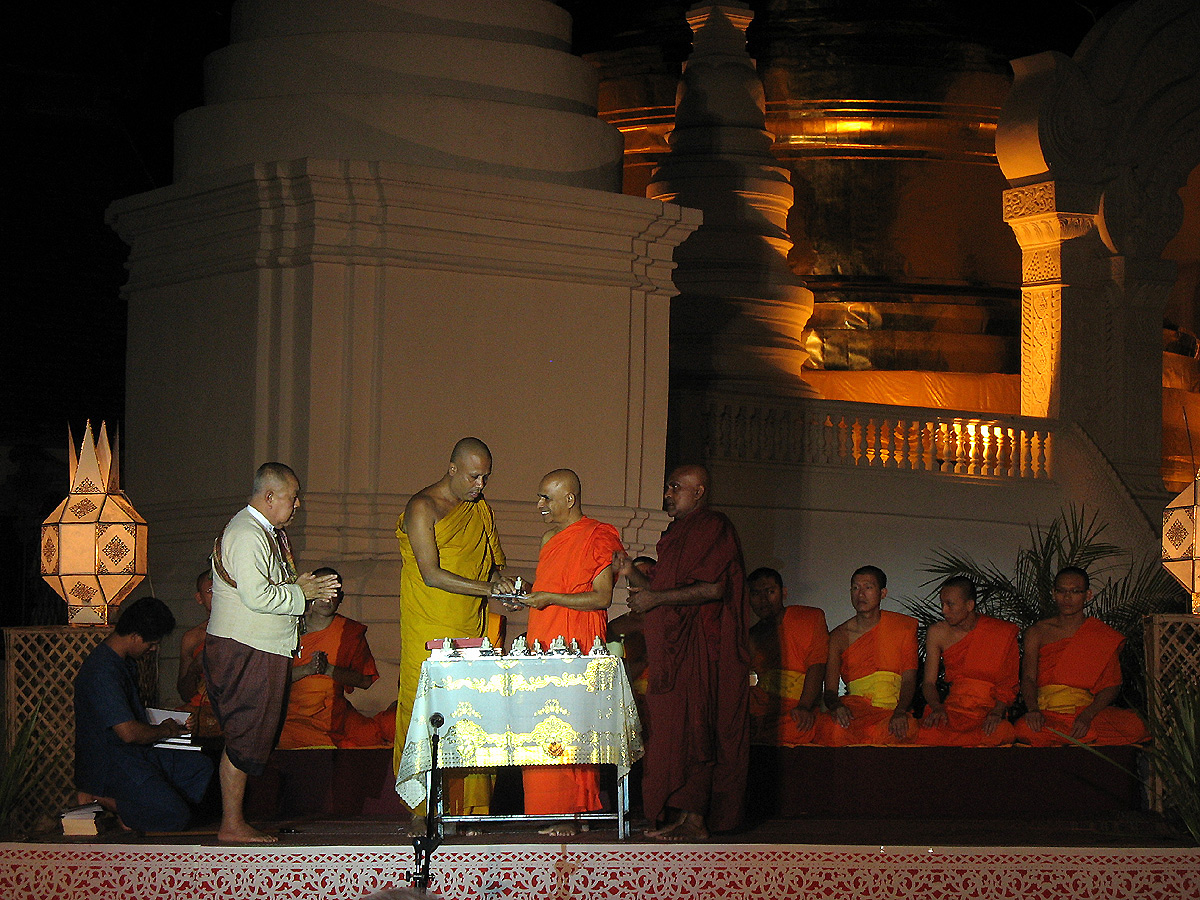
  INEB Conference 2009 in Chiang Mai, Thailand.
- Wongsanit Ashram
- Sekhiya Dhamma Group
- Dhamma Park Foundation
- Santi Pracha Dhamma Institute
- Dhamma Drops Foundation
- Mahachulalongkorn University working group
- Garden of Fruition
- School for Well-being

==== Vietnam ====
Vcil Community

=== South Asia ===
==== Bangladesh ====
- Parbatya Bouddha Mission
- Atish Dipankar Society
- Buddhist Glimpse for Research Centre, Chottagram, Bangladesh.
- Professor Dr. Kanak Baran Barua, D. Litt. (Honorary), USA

==== Bhutan ====
- Bhutan Nuns Association
- Samdrup Jongkhar Initiative

==== India ====
- Jambudvipa Trust
- Deer Park Institute
- Young Buddhist Society of India (YBS)
- Ladakh Nuns Association
- Adecom Network

==== Nepal ====
- Bikalpa Gyan Kendra
- (Individual activists)

==== Sri Lanka ====
- INEB Sri Lanka
- Sewalanka Foundation
- Dharmavedi Institute

=== Oceania ===
==== Australia ====
- Buddhist Peace Fellowship Australia

=== Europe ===
==== Belgium ====
- European Buddhist Union

==== Netherlands ====
- European Buddhist Union

=== North America ===
==== United States ====
- Buddhist Peace Fellowship
- Clear View Project
- Nekorpa and RIGPA Fellowship

=== South America ===
==== Brazil ====
- Instituto Visao Futuro
- Organização Religiosa Tendai Hokke Ichijo Ryu do Brasil

==== Costa Rica ====
- University for Peace

=== Africa ===
==== South Africa ====
- Hout Bay Theravada Sangha
