= Earl Hall =

Academic building in New York City

- U.S. National Register of Historic Places
- New York State Register of Historic Places
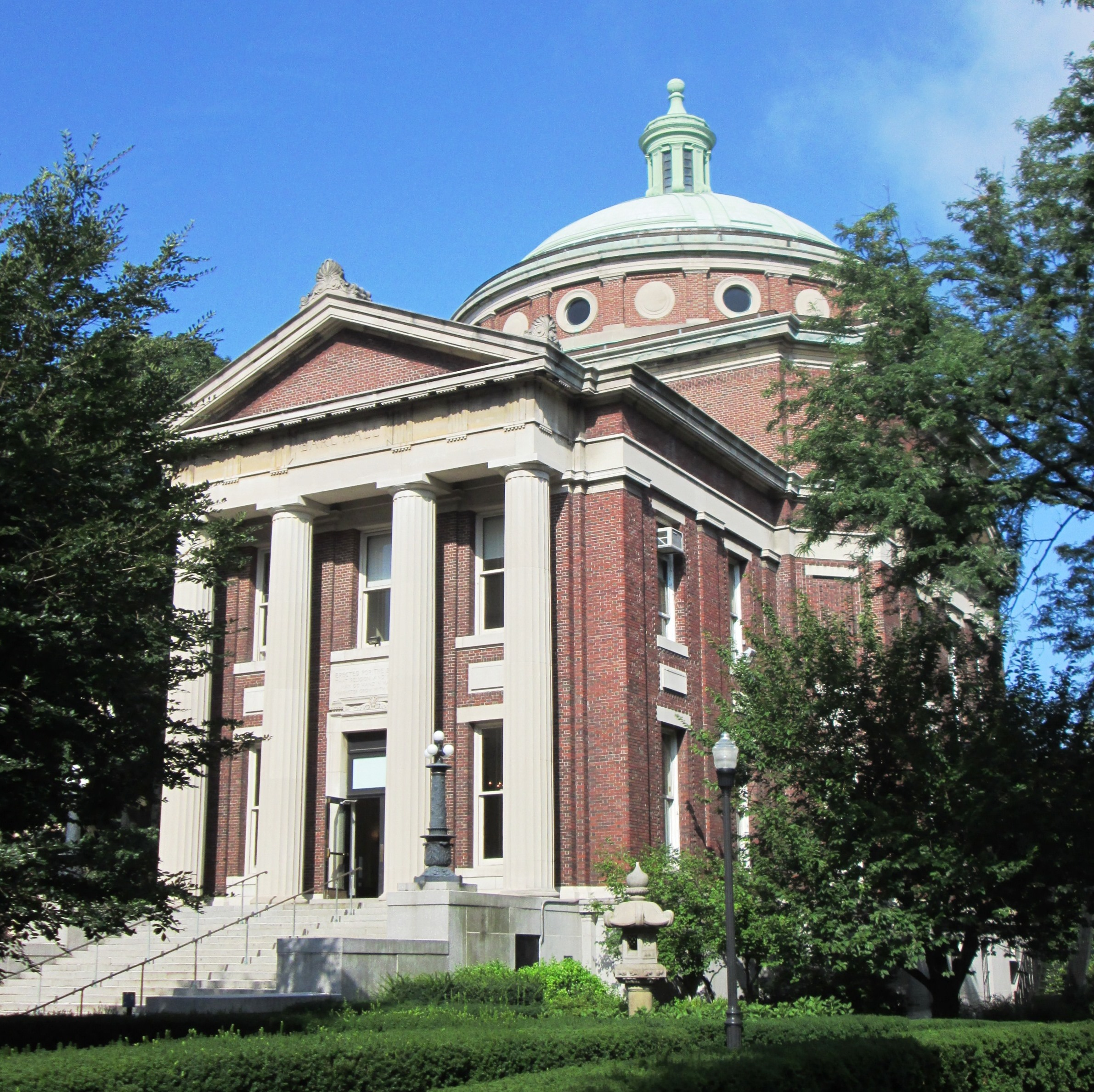
- Earl Hall, 2014

- Location within New York City Location within New York Location within the United States
- Location: 2980 Broadway, New York, New York
- Coordinates: 40°48′30.96″N 73°57′43.62″W
- Area: less than one acre
- Built: 1900
- Architects: McKim, Mead & White
- NRHP reference No.: 100002189
- NYSRHP No.: 06101.019973

Significant dates
- Added to NRHP: March 12, 2018
- Designated NYSRHP: January 17, 2018

Earl Hall is a building on the campus of Columbia University. Built in 1900–1902 and designed by McKim, Mead & White, the building serves as a center for student religious life. It was listed on the National Register of Historic Places in 2018 for its historic role in serving as a venue for meetings and dances of the Columbia Student Homophile League, the oldest LGBTQ student organization in the United States.

On April 2, 2025, in a continuation of protests at Columbia during the Gaza War, students chained themselves to the gates outside of Earl Hall to demand accountability from the university in the detention of Mahmoud Khalil.
