= Church and School of Wicca =

American witchcraft organization

The Church and School of Wicca
- Logo of the Church and School of Wicca
- Formation: 1968
- Type: New Religious Movement; Celtic Wicca
- Headquarters: Hinton, West Virginia, US
- Founders: Gavin and Yvonne Frost

The Church and School of Wicca was founded by Gavin Frost and Yvonne Frost in 1968. It was the first federally recognized Church of the religion known as Wicca in the United States. It is known for its correspondence courses on the Frosts' unique interpretation of Wicca. The Church and School are located in Beckley, West Virginia.

== History ==
The Church of Wicca was founded in 1968. Gavin Frost was a British-born aerospace engineer. While working for an aerospace company in southern England's Salisbury Plain – an area replete with prehistoric monuments, he became interested in the druids. His wife Yvonne was an American with a background in Spiritualism. He then claimed to have been initiated into a Wiccan group in St. Louis, Missouri. When living in St. Louis, they developed a correspondence course through which to teach people about Wicca, advertising these courses as the "School of Wicca". They argued that by spreading their religious teaching in the form of a correspondence course, they were reaching a wider range of people than initiatory-based forms of Wicca, and that this would be necessary in order for the religion to become a "strong religious force". They believed strongly that Wicca should be presented publicly, believing that the secrecy that is observed by some Wiccan groups brought mistrust and persecution from wider society.

"The people who really get in trouble are the people who are semisecret; that's how rumors start. Be public. The government will defend your right to the bitter end, because that's the way we're set up in the U.S. But if you're private and secret then people will come around and burn down your barn in the middle of the night. And then who will defend you."

— Gavin and Yvonne Frost

The Frosts had adopted the term "Wicca" in the late 1960s, when it was gaining increasing usage within the pagan witchcraft community, as a name for their religion. The pair resisted using the term "pagan" until the late 1970s. In 1975, Yvonne stated that "I do not consider myself a pagan. I do not worship any nature deity. I reach upward to the unnameable which has no gender".

In conjunction with his lawyers, Gavin secured religious recognition for his church from the Internal Revenue Service in 1972; this resulted in his church becoming the first recognized church of Wicca in the United States. Later that year, they began working on their Church and School full time. Gavin appointed himself as its archbishop, and Yvonne as a bishop, and they awarded themselves doctorates of divinity through their church. The couple moved first to Salem, Missouri, where they ran a pig farm, and then to New Bern, North Carolina, in 1974. There they tried to establish a survival community, but it failed to materialize. In the late 1970s, they began holding an annual "Samhain Seminar", in which workshops, rituals, and lectures took place, primarily for students of their correspondence course. In 1996, they relocated to Hinton, West Virginia. They subsequently moved to West Virginia in 1993, where Gavin died on 11 September 2016 at the age of 86.

In 1985, the Church of Wicca was involved in the Dettmer v. Landon case, during which the District Court of Virginia ruled that Wicca constitutes a legitimate religion under U.S. law. The Virginia prison authorities appealed the case, and in 1986, Judge J. Butzner of the Federal Appeals Court upheld the original decision. This made the Church of Wicca the only federally recognized Wiccan church to have its status as a religion upheld in a federal appeals court.

Within the American Wiccan and wider modern pagan community, the Frosts have been at the center of various disputes, particularly surrounding issues such as homosexuality and theology. The Wiccan Margot Adler suggested that much of this controversy stemmed from Gavin's "wry and rather bizarre sense of humor, and his tendency to say anything to get a rise out of someone", something which she thought had resulted in the Frosts often being "misunderstood". In person, she thought, the Frosts "have always been delightful", with Gavin being "kind and humorous" and Yvonne being "forthright and even a bit prim".

They published a book titled The Witch's Bible, which generated outrage within the Wiccan community. Many critics referred to it as a "witchcrap book". Many of the central teachings featured in the book, such as its emphasis upon the existence of an asexual monotheistic deity, were completely contradictory to mainstream Wiccan belief. Many Wiccans were angered at the word The as it appeared in the title, presupposing that it carried some form of authority within the Wiccan community. Its comments on race and sex also caused controversy.

== Belief and teaching ==
The Church of Wicca defines Wicca as a monotheistic religion. Gavin asserted that there is one god, which is abstract, unknowable, and beyond the need for any worship. This is one of the teachings which distinguishes it from other Wiccan groups. Unlike many other Wiccan groups, there was no particular emphasis upon female divinity or the feminine, with Gavin calling beliefs about ancient matriarchies "a Marxist heresy".

He also expressed belief in "stone gods" – idols which are created by humans as a storage for energy, which can then be utilized for magical purposes.

The Church taught that the astral realm, which they called the "Sidhe", is structured into ten levels. They taught that each human has a soul which undergoes a progressive system of reincarnation, through which it can learn. The Frosts believed that overpopulation had resulted in "inferior souls" incarnating upon the earth.

The Church taught kundalini sex practices. These included "introitus", in which sex without orgasm was held as a form of surrender to the monotheistic god.

== Impact and legacy ==
Tens of thousands of students have begun the School's twelve-lesson course in Wicca, although only a few thousand have finished it due to the rigor of the course. In 2006, the Wiccan journalist Margot Adler suggested that the School of Wicca may have been responsible for the formation of as many as one hundred covens.

== Curriculum ==
The School's curriculum includes classes on a variety of subjects associated both with Wicca as a religion and with occult and metaphysical studies and practices in general. These classes begin with an "Essential Witchcraft" course, which lasts "a year and a day". Other topics include: Advanced Celtic Witchcraft and Shamanism, Astral Travel, Astrology, Graphology, Mystical Awareness, a Natural Wicca Survey Course, Practical Sorcery, Prediction, Psychic and Herbal Healing, and Tantric Yoga. Much of the course of study is available to the student on video.

== Charters ==
The Church and School chartered several other churches and groups. In the early years of the Church, ordination to individuals and sometimes even charters to churches had at times been offered solely on the basis of the Church's correspondence courses. However, due to a few incidents of fraudulent use of Church credentials, misconduct by these individuals, and/or the use of course material to defame the Church and the religion of Wicca, along with public controversy about these instances, this practice was abandoned as of 1976. In some cases, charters have been revoked.

== See also ==
- Neopagan witchcraft
- Wiccan organisation
