= Prison-Ashram Project =

Prison program encouraging spiritual practices

The Prison-Ashram Project, now administered by Human Kindness Foundation, was started in 1973 by Bo and Sita Lozoff, in cooperation with Ram Dass, to encourage convicts to use meditation and other spiritual teachings, turning their prison time into an ashram-like experience. "Ashram" is a Sanskrit word meaning "House of God".

Bo and Sita Lozoff were the directors of Prison-Ashram Project for decades, giving workshops in prisons throughout the world and answering up to 100 letters per day.

The Prison-Ashram Project has a sister project in England, The Prison Phoenix Trust, which offers yoga and meditation to prisoners in the UK and Ireland.

== See also ==
- Prison contemplative programs
- Prison reform
- Prison religion
- Religion in United States prisons
