= International Prison Chaplains' Association =

The International Prison Chaplains' Association (IPCA) is an association of prison chaplains. It is divided into several sections like IPCA-Europe, IPCA Oceania etc. It is a non-governmental organization and has held Special Consultative Status to the United Nations Economic and Social Council since 2014.

== IPCA Europe ==
IPCA-Europe, the European section of the global IPCA organization (founded 1985 in Bossey, Switzerland), commenced its work with the Ecumenical Conference for Pastoral Counselling in European Prisons, held in Strasbourg in May 1992. The conference was conducted in collaboration with the Council of Europe.

The working goal (now partially achieved) is to create a network between prison chaplains of all Christian churches in Europe. The network is intended to facilitate ecumenical cooperation and mutual support. The chief aims are: maintenance of human rights and freedom of religious practice and pastoral counseling in prisons, protection of minorities and improvement of the situation of crime victims.

At regular intervals, currently every four years, IPCA-Europe organizes a pan-European conference chiefly aimed at active prison chaplains. Following the 1992 event, further conferences took place in Rugby, England in 1994, in Ystad, Sweden in 1997 and in Driebergen, the Netherlands in 2001. Each conference was attended by more than 100 participants from some 30 European countries. Between the pan-European conferences IPCA-Europe also initiates working groups and regional conferences in collaboration with regional and national associations of prison chaplains.

IPCA-Europe is an associate organization of the CEC (Conference of European Churches) and is in contact with the Committee for the Prevention of Torture of the Council of Europe.

During the pan-European conferences a steering committee is elected to prepare the next conference and to conduct business. The steering committee is itself responsible for funding its work. It elects a chairman and, generally speaking, meets twice a year. The steering committee currently comprises eight elected members and one co-opted member from various European regions and churches.

IPCA-Europe does not have a secure budget at its disposal. The work is funded through project-based ecclesiastical and state grants. This funding is particularly crucial for ensuring the collaboration and participation of prison chaplains from Eastern and Southern Europe.

The Ten Points of IPCA-EUROPE

1. "IPCA Europe works on an ecumenical basis, founded on the IPCA Worldwide Charter".
2. "We are keen to engage in activities which are firmly based on the good news of Jesus Christ"
3. "We are seeking to develop exchanges in Europe between our various chaplaincies with a view to providing mutual support".
4. "We hope to establish European networks to encourage twinning and ecumenical working groups".
5. "We hope that these exchanges could be extended to other countries, particularly the Third World, in conjunction with IPCA Worldwide".
6. "We also hope to develop our watchfulness concerning the problems of justice and human rights, and with this in mind to work alongside the European Ecumenical Commission for Church and Society (Brussels and Strasbourg). (EECCS has developed to: KEK-Commission for Church and Society)
7. "We hope to be able to share more in the problems faced by church chaplains in Eastern Europe and Southern Europe".
8. "We are working to help our churches to adopt the most appropriate position vis-à-vis justice and its social consequences in each of our countries"
9. "In the name of the different churches, united in the same desire to serve, we are called, as chaplains, to become communities of action and prayer in Jesus Christ".
10. "God willing, we will meet for a new Conference, organised by the Committee of IPCA-Europe, which will be held on the date and at the place to be decided on, if we so wish.
