= Remission for Reading =

Program for prisoners in Brazil

Remission for Reading (Portuguese: Remição pela Leitura) is a set of programs and judicially-recognised procedures in Brazil that allow people deprived of liberty to reduce their prison sentences by participating in approved reading and study activities and submitting summaries or reviews of the books they read.

The practice began as local initiatives in the 2000s and was later incorporated into national guidance and state laws; it has since spread to many Brazilian states and received international attention as a prison-education and rehabilitation measure.

== Origin ==
Reading-based sentence remission in Brazil grew from pilot projects in the late 2000s and early 2010s, notably programs run in federal and state prisons that sought to encourage literacy, education and social reintegration.

In 2012, law No. 17.329 (2012) institutionalised in the State of Paraná the programme of remission by reading, which helped to catalyse similar projects elsewhere in the country. Other countries such as Kazakhstan and Uzbekistan have adopted similar programs.

== Program ==
Implementations share common features, though details differ between jurisdictions:

1. A catalogue or library of approved books is made available to participants, and accessibility options (audio, Braille) are sometimes provided.

2. A prisoner reads a book within a specified period and writes a summary, review or other evaluative piece. The work is submitted to a validation committee or directly to the execution judge.

3. When the submission is accepted, the prisoner receives a fixed remission of time from their sentence (commonly reported as four days’ remission per validated work) up to a statutory or regulatory annual cap (commonly reported as 12 books per year — i.e., up to 48 days per year under the frequently used four-days-per-book rule).
