= Columbia Queer Alliance =

Columbia University student organization

Logo of the Columbia Queer Alliance

Columbia Queer Alliance (CQA) is the central Columbia University student organization that represents lesbian, gay, bisexual, transgender, and questioning LGBTQ students. It is the oldest such student organization in the world, originally called the Student Homophile League, established in 1966 and recognized by the university on April 19, 1967.

== History ==
During its first year, the Student Homophile League had about ten members who fought with university administrators until the group was officially recognized. Stephen Donaldson, a bisexual-identified LGBT rights activist, is commemorated by a plaque and a portrait in the queer student lounge that bears his name, in one of Columbia's residence halls, for spearheading the creation of the group. One of the key issues over which Donaldson clashed with the administration was the right to keep members' names confidential.

When the group's charter was finally granted in April 1967, Donaldson sent an announcement to every media outlet he knew, but the only response was a radio interview on WNEW, a New York station, and an article in the Columbia Daily Spectator, which reported that some students believed the new group was an April Fools' Day joke. Two weeks later, on May 3, The New York Times reported the story on its front page. Donaldson later wrote: "The next couple days were frantic as media—which had ignored the press release—suddenly wanted the information I had already given them."

Student activists at Cornell University, Massachusetts Institute of Technology, New York University, Rutgers University, and Stanford University formed similar groups of their own within two years. More than 150 such student groups had been established by the end of four years.

== Activities ==
Among other activities, the Columbia Queer Alliance has hosted "First Friday Dances" for decades, which at their inception were one of the few places where college-age LGBT people could socialize with one another.

Many of the Columbia Queer Alliance's activities have been historically held in Earl Hall, which was listed on the National Register of Historic Places in 2018 in recognition of its role in queer history.
