= Ayelet Menahemi =

Israeli filmmaker

- איילת מנחמי
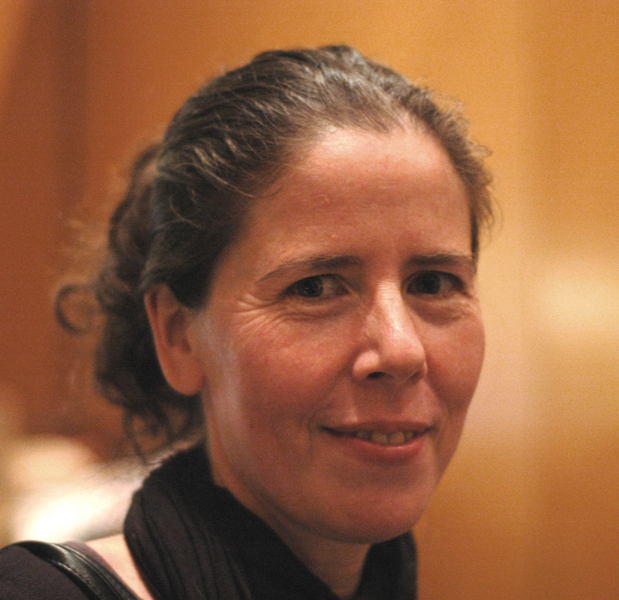
- Born: 1963 (age 62–63)
- Occupations: Film director, producer, writer, editor, actress

Ayelet Menahemi (Hebrew: איילת מנחמי; born 1963) is an Israeli film director, producer, writer, editor, and actress.

== Life and Works ==
Menahemi was born in Tel Aviv in 1963. She attended Beit Zvi School of Stage and Cinematic Arts, graduating with honors in 1985.

In 1986, she directed the award-winning 45-minute film, "Crows," followed by her first two feature films, "The Skippers 3" (1991) and "Tel Aviv Stories" (1992).

Other films directed by Menahemi include It's About Time (2001), Noodle (2007) and Seven Blessings (2023) which she also produced, and she acted in Ben Gurion Airport (1997). She wrote the screenplays for Noodle and Tel Aviv Stories. Menahemi's work also includes numerous television commercials, short fiction films, documentaries and music videos.

In 1995, along with Eilona Ariel, she created the production company, Karuna Films. Among the films that Menahemi and Ariel have produced together is "Doing Time, Doing Vipassana" (1997), a documentary that "traces the effects of an ancient form of Buddhist meditation on a community of men inside an Indian prison."

== Awards ==
Menahemi's first short film, "Crows," won prizes in film festivals around the world. Her film "Noodle" garnered nominations for the 2007 Israel Film Academy Awards in the categories of Best Director and Best Screenplay. Additionally, she won the 2000 Gold Illumination Award and Silver Award for "Doing Time, Doing Vipassana" from the Crested Butte Reel Fest; the 2007 Special Grand Prize of the Jury for "Noodle" at the Montreal World Film Festival; and the 1998 Golden Spire Award for "Doing Time, Doing Vipassana" at the San Francisco International Film Festival. "It’s About Time" (2001) won the Jerusalem Festival Wolgin award and the Japan Prize.
