= Eilona Ariel =

Israeli filmmaker

- אילונה אריאל
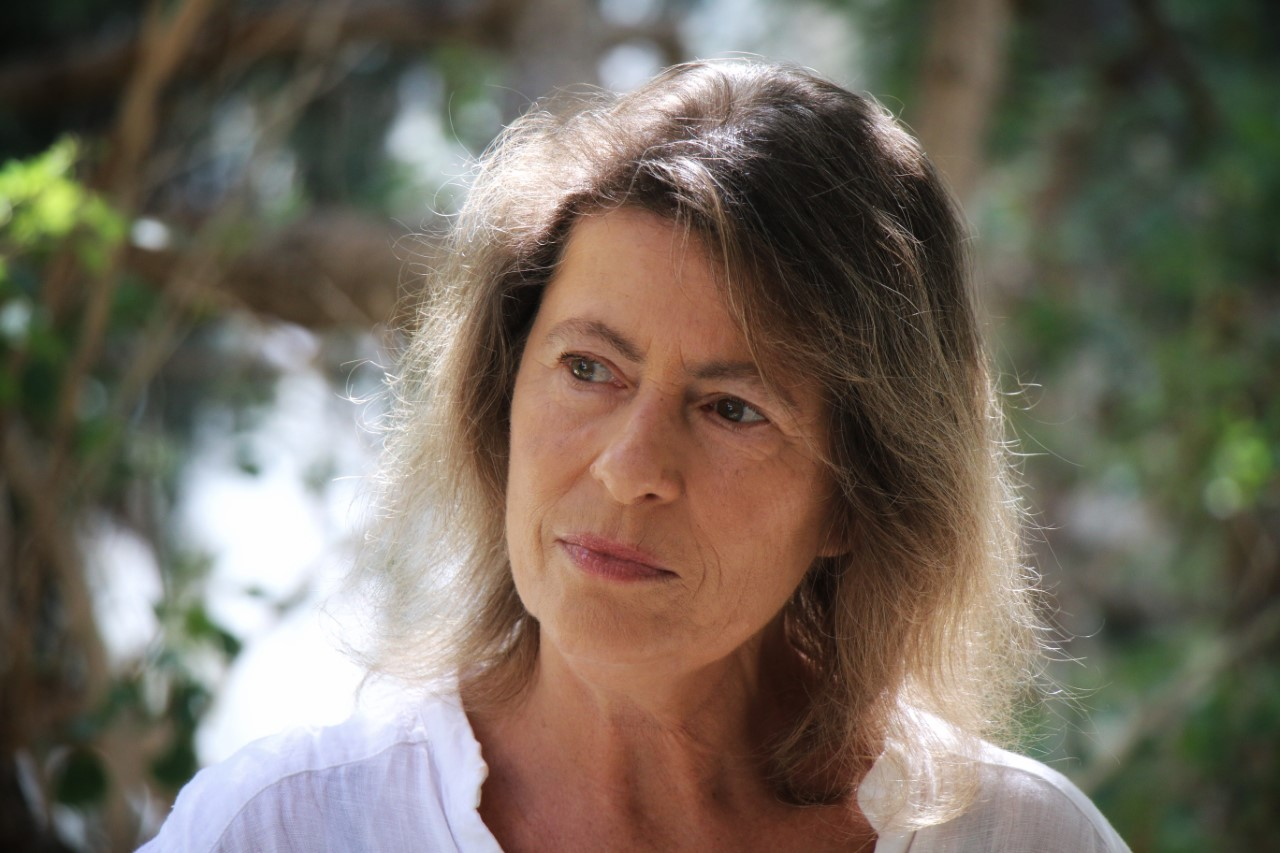
- Born: 1958 (age 67–68); Israel
- Education: Germain School of Photography
- Occupation: Documentary filmmaker

Eilona (Elona) Ariel (Hebrew: אילונה אריאל; born 1958) is a documentary filmmaker.

== Early life ==
Ariel was born in 1958 in Israel as Eilona Frenkel.

== Career ==
In 1978 she moved to New York City and spent nine years studying and working as a musician and a photographer.

In 1980 she received a diploma from the Germain School of Photography in New York City. From 1983 to 1984 she was the managing director of the International Production Manual - The Producer's Masterguide.

Between the years of 1987 and 1995 she lived and worked in Asia.

In 1995, Ms. Ariel returned to Israel where she established the production company Karuna Films Ltd., together with Ayelet Menahemi. Since then she has produced and co-directed several documentaries, among them the award-winning Doing Time, Doing Vipassana (1997), which made a great impact on prison systems all over the world, and won the Pass Award of The National Council on Crime and Delinquency (USA). In 2005, Doing Time, Doing Vipassana was re-released for screenings all over the USA. Ms. Ariel's film, It’s About Time won the Best Documentary and Best Script prizes at the Jerusalem International Film Festival, the 2002 Japan Prize for Best Documentary, and participated in INPUT 2002, IDFA, and the Toronto International Film Festival.

Her films have been broadcast on PBS, NBC, ABC, MSNBC, the National Geographic Channel, and the Discovery Channel.

Between 2012 -2013 she worked as the COO of Hostr, a web platform that curated talent for live performances in home venues. From 2014 until 2019 Eilona Ariel was working at The Yuval Noah Harari International Office, managing his Film/TV dept. Eilona is executive producing the adaptation of Prof. Harari's best seller book SAPiENS, to be produced by Ridley Scott and directed by Oscar Winner, Asif Kapadia.

Since 2019 she is working on various projects with multidisciplinary artists.

== Filmography ==
- Doing Time, Doing Vipassana; written and directed by Eilona Ariel and Ayelet Menahemi

Israel, 1997, 70 Minutes, Color, Hebrew, English Subtitles

- It's About Time; by Ayelet Menahemi and Eilona Ariel

Israel, 2001, 54 Minutes, Color, Hebrew, English Subtitles

- The Compass
- Pilgrimage to the Sacred Land
- Global Pagoda
- Beyond the Gardens (a film about Baron de Rothschild)

It's About Time

Awards

- NHK JAPAN PRIZE

INTERNATIONAL EDUCATIONAL PROGRAM CONTEST - 2002
Grand Prix and the Governor of Tokyo Prize for Best Documentary

- JERUSALEM INTERNATIONAL FILM FESTIVAL - July 2001

Wonlgin Prize for Best Documentary Lipper Prize for Best Script

Festivals

- Jerusalem Intl. Film Festival - July 2001
- Toronto International Film Festival (TIFF) - September 2001
- Amsterdam International Documentary Film Festival (IDFA) - November 2001
- Goteborg Film Festival (Sweden) - January 2002
- Venice International Television Festival - March 2002
- Philadelphia Jewish Film Festival - March 2002
- Wisconsin Film Festival - April 2002
- Mediawave Film Festival, Hungary - April 2002
- Israel Film Festival, U.S.A - April–June 2002
- Stockholm Jewish Film Festival - May 2002
- INPUT 2002, Rotterdam - May 2002
- Kalamata International Documentary Film Festival - Greece - October 2002
- Docupolis, Barcelona - October 2002
- JAPAN PRIZE contest, Tokyo - November 2002
- Boston Jewish Film Festival - November 2002
- Washington Jewish Film Festival - December 2002
- Palm Beach Jewish Film Festival - December 2002
- Tucson Jewish Film Festival - January 2003
- ISRATIM - Paris Israeli Film Festival - January 2003
- Allentown Jewish Film Festival - March 2003
- Minneapolis Festival of Jewish Film - March 2003
- THE PROMISE - THE LAND festival, Linz, Austria - April 2003
- New Jersey Jewish Film Festival - April 2003
- Vancouver Jewish Film Festival - May 2003

TV/Cable

- Channel 8 - Israel, September 2001
- YLE TV - Finland, October 2002
- NHK-Japan, November 2002
- SIC - Portugal, October 2002
- CUNY-TV - New York, USA, Fall 2003
- Continental Airlines - October 2002

Doing Time, Doing Vipassana

Awards

- Golden Spire - San Francisco International Film Festival, 1998
- Silver Plaque - INTERCOM, Chicago 1998
- NCCD Pass Award - The National Council On Crime And Delinquency, USA 1998
- Finalist Award - New York Film Festivals, 1998
- Silver Winner Award - Crested Butte Reel Festival, Colorado, USA 2000
- Gold Illumination Award - Crested Butte Reel Festival, Colorado, USA 2000

Television Screenings

- PBS - USA 1998
- NHK - Japan
- INFINITY - Mexico, Argentina, Peru, Brazil, Venezuela, Panama
- YLE - Finland
- Channel 8 - Israel
- TV Poland
- TSI - Switzerland
- DR TV - Denmark
- RTÉ - Ireland
- ITN - Sri Lanka
- Seattle Public TV - U.S.A.2000
- World Link TV - U.S.A.
- The Dish Network - U.S.A.
- Channel 11 - Thailand
- SHAW TV CALGARY - U.S.A. 2002
- Multicultural Channel 78 - U.S.A. 2002
- Shaw TV Edmonton - U.S.A. 2002

Festivals

- DocuNoga Film Festival - Israel 1997
- San Francisco International Film Festival - USA, 1998
- New York International Film Festival - USA, 1998
- Santa Barbara International Film Festival - USA, 1998
- Intercom - Chicago, Illinois 1998
- Taiwan International Documentary Film Festival - Taiwan, 1998
- Media Wave - Hungary, 1999
- Ethno Film Festival - Berlin, Germany 1999
- Bombay International Film Festival - Bombay, India, 1999
- Portland Women Directors Film Festival - Oregon, U.S.A.1999
- Crested Butte Reel Festival - Colorado, U.S.A 2000
- Unesco 2nd Festival of Women Creators Of the Two Seas - Greece, 2000
- Buddhism in Film (Caligari FilmBuhne) - Wiesbaden, Germany 1999
- Women in Buddhism - Cologne, Germany 2000
- Buddhist Film Festival - Wien, Austria, 2000
- Parabola Film & Video Festival - New York, U.S.A., 2000
- Human Rights Nights Film Festivals - Bologna, Italy, 27–30 March 2003
- Buddhist Film Festival - Ulan Batar, Mongolia, 2004

Theatrical Screenings

- Cinema Village - New York City
- The Loft Cinema - Tucson, Arizona
- AZ Reel Art Ways Cinema - Hartford, Connecticut
- Roxie Cinema - San Francisco, California
- The MAC - Dallas, Texas
- Cinematheque - Tel-Aviv, Israel
- Bijou Theatre - Eugene, Oregon
- Lumiere cinema - Göttingen, Germany
