= Susanna Meredith =

Irish activist, editor

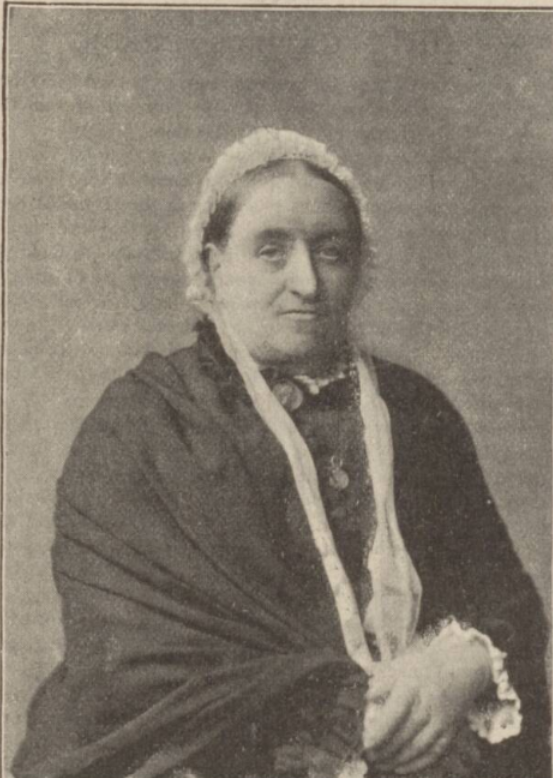
Susanna Meredith

Susanna Meredith (née Lloyd; 1823–1901) was a 19th-century Irish-born prison visitor and pioneer for the rehabilitation of female prisoners.

== Biography ==
Susanna Lloyd was born in Ireland, her father was the governor of Cork County Gaol. As a child she learned Latin, Hebrew, French and German. At the age of 17, she married a doctor, but was widowed after seven years of marriage. 1847 - 1852 - She managed the Adelaide Industrial School in Cork, which became a central depot for the export of Irish Lace to England. 1856 ? She moved to England with her widowed mother. In 1858, Meredith began visiting Millbank Prison with the British Society. In 1860 she moved to London with her mother and, concerned with employment opportunities for women, began editing Alexandra magazine. She visited female prisoners in Brixton prison and started a mission offering breakfasts, advice, and limited employment opportunities to newly released women. She reported her visits to the Home Secretary Sir George Grey.

Meredith's home at Nine Elms House, 6 Upper Belmont House, Wandsworth Road was known as The Mission to Women and was used by female prisoners leaving prison. Meredith became the Treasurer of the Female Prisoners' Aid Society.

Meredith later turned her attention to the children of convicted women and in 1871 her first home for such children was opened in Addlestone, Surrey by Princess Mary. In 1877, she was told that she was no longer permitted to talk to women prisoners without a matron present. From then, she decided to stop visiting. In 1895 Meredith gave evidence before the Gladstone Committee on prisons.

== Bibliography ==
- 1865: The Lacemakers: sketches of Irish Characters with Sound Accounts of the Effort to Establish Lacemaking in Ireland. Dedicated to Miss (Angela) Burdett Coutts, for her 'suggestions on the subject of providing industrial instruction for the female poor of Ireland.
- 1866: The Sixth Work; Or, The Charity of Moral Effort
- 1881: A Book about Criminals
- 1881: Saved Rahab! An Autobiography. Nisbet. Edited by Mrs Meredith.
