= Doing Time, Doing Vipassana =

1997 Israeli documentary film

- Theatrical poster
- Directed by: Ayelet Menahemi; Eilona Ariel
- Produced by: Eilona Ariel
- Starring: Kiran Bedi
- Narrated by: Paul Samson
- Cinematography: Ayelet Menahemi
- Edited by: Ayelet Menahemi
- Music by: Ady Cohen; Ari Frankel
- Production company: Karuna Films
- Distributed by: Immediate Pictures (2005 theatrical)
- Release date: 1997
- Running time: 52 minutes
- Countries: India; Israel
- Language: English

Doing Time, Doing Vipassana is a 1997 Israeli independent documentary film by Ayelet Menahemi and Eilona Ariel. The film is about the application of the vipassana meditation technique taught by S. N. Goenka to prisoner rehabilitation at Tihar Jail in India (which was reputed to be an exceptionally harsh prison). The film inspired other correctional facilities such as the North Rehabilitation Facility in Seattle to use Vipassana as a means of rehabilitation.

Kiran Bedi, former Inspector General of Prisons for New Delhi, appears in the film.

== Reception ==
Doing Time, Doing Vipassana received an average score of 64 based on eight critics at Metacritic. It received a 71% rating based on 14 reviews at Rotten Tomatoes.

The San Francisco Chronicle wrote of the film winning the Golden Spire Award at the San Francisco International Film Festival when noting its 2005 theatrical release. They praised the film, writing it had "distinct virtues: It tells a fascinating story. It makes a strong case for an alternative approach to incarcerated criminals. And it provides an attractive introduction to Vipassana meditation."

Slant Magazine gave the film two out of five stars, and generally panned the film, stating that the directors "fail to really get inside the heads of their subjects and to seriously convey the extent to which violence plays a role in their daily lives, choosing instead to follow the process with which Vipassana comes to the prison community and holds its prisoners in rapture." They felt the film's repeated use of "hyperbolic narration....strains to summon a sense of spiritual gravitas" and that the filmmakers brevity and informational tone made the film "something akin to an Epcot Center attraction."

=== Awards and nominations ===
- 1998, winner of 'Golden Spire Award' at the San Francisco International Film Festival
- 1998, winner of NCCD Pass Award from the American National Council on Crime and Delinquency
- 2000, winner of 'Gold Illumination Award' at Crested Butte Film Festival
- 2000, winner of 'Silver Award' for best documentary at Crested Butte Reel Fest

== See also ==
- Satipatthana Sutta
- Vipassana Movement
- The Dhamma Brothers (2007)
