= Crossroad Bible Institute =

Faith-based reentry education for people in prison

Crossroads Prison Ministries, Formerly "Crossroads Bible Institute" (CBI), provided faith-based reentry education for people in prison in the United States and around the world. It was founded in 1984.

As a state-licensed post-secondary school, CPM offered courses on three levels corrected by trained and certified Instructors. The school's Center for Advanced Studies included not only the accredited college courses but also housed CBI's prisoner reentry program that placed its students with reentry agencies in the area of their anticipated release to assist them in finding a job, securing housing, continuing their education and, if desired, locating a church. Lessons were also developed for the children of prisoners.

Crossroads Prison Ministries was envisioned and directed by Tom De Vries. Its first courses were authored by Dr. Ed Roels. Radio pastor, Dr. David Feddes, was instrumental in the early years for recruiting instructors and even attracting students outside North America. From 1999 to 2015, the school was led by Dr. H. David Schuringa as it grew rapidly worldwide with 20 satellite campuses on all six livable continents, with courses in English and Spanish. During the 2014 school year, CBI had 45,876 active students, 5,625 Instructors correcting lessons, and 397 volunteers in the Grand Rapids office. Schuringa founded not only Crossroad's CAS, but also its Inmate Art Gallery, Crossroad Connection – its radio and television programs, and its influential social justice arm – a voice for restorative justice – Crossroad Correctional Ministries.

Dr. Schuringa worked closely with Chuck Colson while the post-secondary school served as the long-term discipleship arm of Prison Fellowship Ministries. As the President of CBI, he and Mrs. Schuringa were VIP attendees at Mr. Colson's funeral in the Washington National Cathedral. He presented in Washington DC on Capital Hill before bi-partisan Congressional and Senate briefings, as well as before the Michigan Supreme Court.

In 2015, Dr. Schuringa moved on serving several years as a (founding) Commissioner Appointee of Governor Rick Snyder, to improve and reform public defense efforts for the poor in the criminal justice system.

By 2019, under its new leadership, licensure for the Institute had been ended and the organization pivoted to a para-church prison ministry and rebranded as Crossroads Prison Ministries. In 2021-22 the ministry serviced 29,176 inmates world-wide with Bible studies and mentors.
