= Celtic Wicca =

Aspect of Celtic mythology

- Abbreviation: CW
- Type: Wicca / Syncretic Wicca
- Orientation: Celtic neopaganism
- Governance: Priesthood
- Founder: Gerald Gardner
- Origin: 1950s England
- Members: Unknown

Celtic Wicca is a modern form of Wicca that incorporates some elements of Celtic mythology. It employs the same basic theology, rituals and beliefs as most other forms of Wicca. Celtic Wiccans use the names of Celtic deities, mythological figures, and seasonal festivals within a Wiccan ritual structure and belief system, rather than a traditional or historically Celtic one.

== Origins ==
Wicca, as established by Englishman Gerald Gardner in the 1950s, was not Celtic in nature but contained some influences and borrowings from Celtic sources. "Celtic" Wicca can be seen as emphasizing and elaborating on the facets of Gardnerian Wicca that practitioners believe to be Celtic, while de-emphasizing some of the more obviously non-Celtic facets (such as the worship of deities from other cultures). Author Jane Raeburn believes that while there is "a firm distinction between historical Celtic inspiration and modern Wiccan practice", that the two can be blended to form "a living path of ethical and spiritual growth". As Carl McColman has observed, many people find beauty and meaning in this spirituality that blends "religious witchcraft with Celtic wisdom".

Several different variations of the tradition have existed. For instance, Lady Sheba (Jessie Bell) called her tradition "American Celtic Wicca". Gavin Frost and Yvonne Frost of the Church and School of Wicca called their tradition "Celtic Wicca" and followers of this tradition identify as Celtic Wiccans. Additionally, numerous Eclectic Wiccan groups and individuals incorporate what they believe to be Celtic features and self-identify as Celtic Wiccans or Celtic neopagans.

== Comparisons to other traditions ==
Celtic Wicca can be seen as both a form of Wicca and a branch of Celtic neopaganism. On the neopagan continuum from eclectic to reconstructionist, Celtic Wicca is at the eclectic end: as non-historical as most forms of Neo-druidism, and contrasting firmly with Celtic reconstructionism, which emphasizes cultural focus and historical accuracy.

== Criticisms ==
Celtic Wicca is criticized for a number of reasons. Critics point to the very recent development of the "tradition", its modernly syncretic nature, its misappropriation or misrepresentation of authentic Celtic traditions and history, and its difference from all historically attested Celtic beliefs and practices. Authors including Ronald Hutton, Aidan Kelly, John Michael Greer and Gordon Cooper have noted that Celtic Wicca draws on mythology by way of the Romanticist Celtic Revival rather than historical fact. Further, these authors have documented that Gardnerian Wicca was synthesized from elements of many cultures and traditions including Hinduism, English folklore, romanticized misinterpretations of what Gardner believed to be Native American beliefs and ceremonies, and the ritual structures and terminology used by the Freemasons. Greer and Cooper specifically point to Gardner's involvement in the English Woodcraft and Kibbo Kift groups as a strong influence.

== See also ==
- Modern Celts
