= Dettmer v. Landon =

1986 United States court case

- Court: United States Court of Appeals for the Fourth Circuit
- Full case name: Herbert Daniel Dettmer v. Robert Landon, Director of Corrections
- Decided: September 4, 1986
- Citation: 799 F.2d 929 (4th Cir. 1986)

Case history
- Prior history: 617 F. Supp. 592 (E.D. Va. 1985)

Court membership
- Judges sitting: Donald S. Russell; Francis Dominic Murnaghan Jr.; John D. Butzner Jr.

Case opinions
- Majority: Butzner, joined by a unanimous court

Dettmer v. Landon, 799 F.2d 929 (4th Cir. 1986), is a court case in which the United States Court of Appeals for the Fourth Circuit held that although Wicca is a religion, it was not a violation of the First Amendment to deny a prisoner access to ritual objects.

== Facts ==
The plaintiff, Herbert Daniel Dettmer, was a Virginia prisoner, and a member of the School of Wicca. Dettmer desired access to ritual objects, including several varieties of knife, with which to practice Wiccan rituals. Knives, of course, are not available to prisoners. When the state would not provide him these ritual objects, he sued Robert Landon, the Director of the Virginia Department of Corrections in federal court to get access to objects he claimed were necessary for his religious practice. The United States District Court for the Eastern District of Virginia decided in Dettmer's favor, finding that Wicca was a religion, rejecting the argument put forward by the Department of Correction that it was merely a "conglomeration" of occult practices. This decision was appealed to the Fourth Circuit Court of Appeals, and was argued before the appellate court in April 1986.

== Opinion of the Fourth Circuit ==
The Fourth Circuit, in a decision by Senior Circuit Judge John D. Butzner Jr., affirmed the district court's ruling that Wicca was a religion, but vacated the injunction.

The appellate court considered but rejected the claims of the government about Wicca itself, which included that Wicca was a mere "conglomeration" of "various aspects of the occult, such as faith healing, self-hypnosis, tarot card reading, and spell casting, none of which would be considered religious practices standing alone", and that even if Dettmer's beliefs were religious, the rituals were not.

The conclusion of the Fourth Circuit was that the district court had found that Dettmer had a religious belief entitled to full First Amendment protections, but that he was not entitled to an injunction, since "the decision to prohibit Dettmer from possessing the items that he sought did not discriminate against him because of his unconventional beliefs."

== Importance of the case ==
While not entirely a victory for Dettmer, this was the first time Wicca was recognized by a court of law as a legitimate religion.
