= Prison Mindfulness Institute =

American non-profit organization

The Prison Mindfulness Institute (PMI) is a registered dba of the Prison Dharma Network (PDN), a non-profit organization founded in 1989. Its mission is to support prisoners and prison volunteers in transformation through meditation and contemplative spirituality in prisons. The organization operates several core programs, including Path of Freedom, a mindfulness-based emotional intelligence training and curriculum; Books Behind Bars, which provides books and resources to incarcerated individuals; and the Prison Dharma Press, which publishes books on prison dharma. The organization also runs the Engaged Mindfulness Institute for facilitator training and the Center for Mindfulness in Public Safety, which focuses on wellness for corrections staff.

The organization is an affiliate of the Buddhist Peace Fellowship and the Zen Peacemakers. Philosophically, the organization encourages restorative justice and transformative justice models over retributive justice.

The organization lists as its spiritual advisors (past and present): Robert Baker Aitken Roshi, Pema Chödrön, Roshi Bernie Glassman, Roshi Joan Halifax, Father Thomas Keating, Jack Kornfield, Stephen Levine, John Daido Loori, Thrangu Rinpoche, Sharon Salzberg, Joseph Goldstein, Venerable Thubten Chodron, and Jon Kabat-Zinn.

== History ==
The organization was founded by Fleet Maull in 1989 while he was serving a 14-year sentence for drug trafficking at the U.S. Medical Center for Federal Prisoners in Springfield, Missouri.[1] A student of Chögyam Trungpa Rinpoche, Maull had completed a master’s degree in psychology from Naropa University prior to his 1985 incarceration. While imprisoned, he maintained a rigorous contemplative practice and began teaching meditation to other prisoners.

In 1991, Maull also founded the National Prison Hospice Association (NPHA) after helping to establish the first residential prison hospice program in the United States to care for prisoners dying of AIDS and other terminal illnesses.

Maull was released in 1999. He was also ordained as a priest and Zen teacher in the Zen Peacemakers Sangha of Bernie Glassman. Since 1999, the organization has been co-led by Executive Director Kate Vita Pires (formerly Vita Pires and Kate Crisp), Ph.D. Under her leadership, the organization expanded its scope beyond Buddhist-specific "dharma" to include secular mindfulness-based interventions. This evolution led to the organization’s current operations under the name Prison Mindfulness Institute (PMI). Today, the organization oversees diverse initiatives including the Engaged Mindfulness Institute and the Center for Mindfulness in Public Safety.

== See also ==
- Books to Prisoners
- The Dhamma Brothers
- Richard Geller
