= Bo Lozoff =

American writer and humanitarian

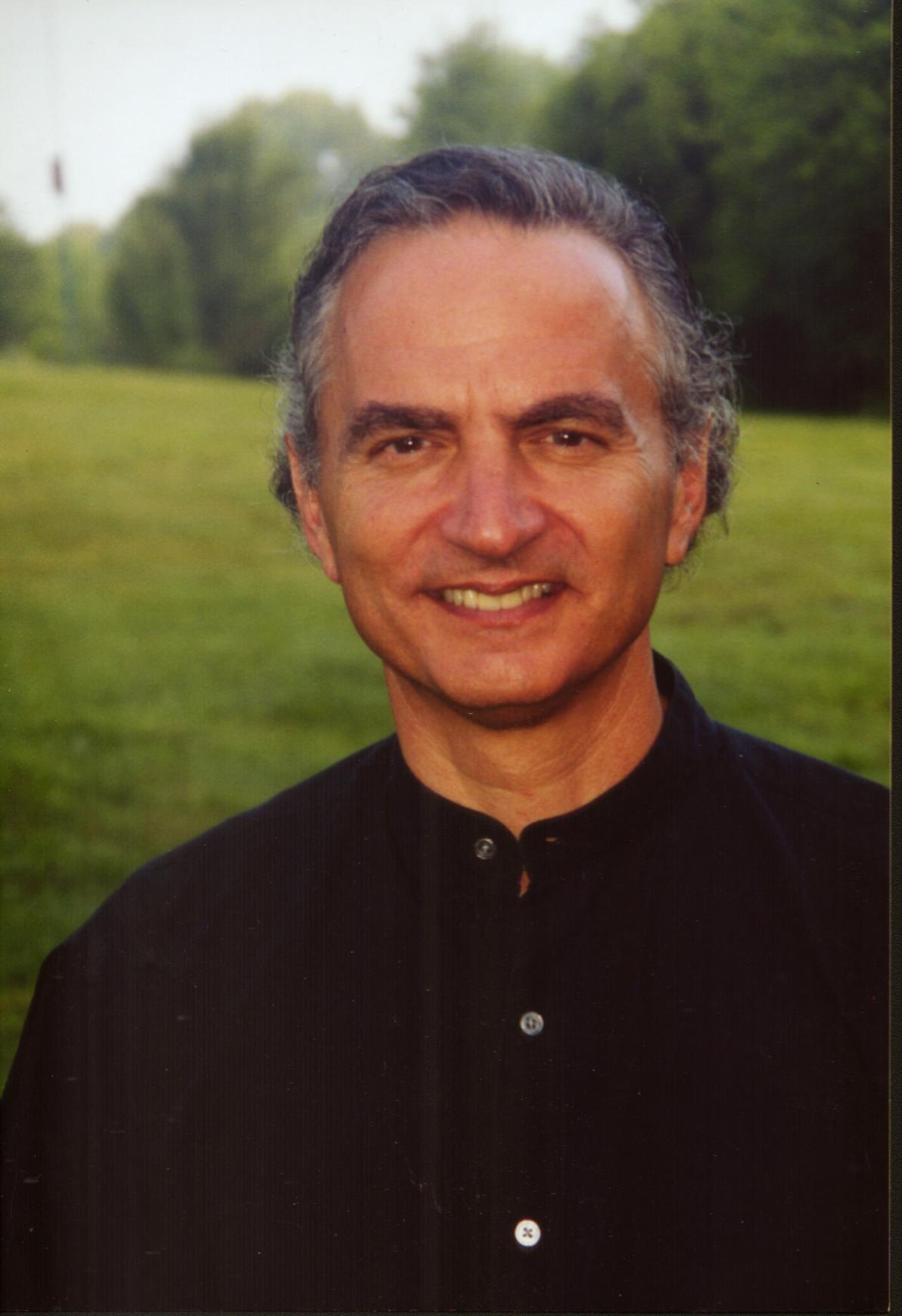
Bo Lozoff

Bo Lozoff (January 10, 1947 – November 29, 2012) was an American writer and interfaith humanitarian. He co-founded several nonprofits, including the interfaith Human Kindness Foundation and its subsidiary Prison-Ashram Project, Carolina Biodiesel, and Kindness House. Many of Lozoff's nonprofits aimed to improve the lives of prisoners and the previously incarcerated.

== Nonprofit work ==
Lozoff, with his wife Sita Lozoff, founded the Human Kindness Foundation. He started the Prison-Ashram Project in 1973. The Prison-Ashram Project, operated by Human Kindness Foundation, sends free interfaith books, compact discs, and correspondence to prisoners around the world. Bo Lozoff retired from Human Kindness Foundation in 2011; Sita Lozoff and a small staff continue the work of Human Kindness Foundation.

Lozoff also founded an environmental non-profit, Carolina Biodiesel, for the dual purposes of promoting biodiesel and creating jobs for ex-cons. Carolina Biodiesel received a large bequest from Fred Rogers, who named Lozoff along with Mahatma Gandhi and Albert Schweitzer, as one of his personal heroes. Carolina Biodiesel is still operating in Durham.

== Writings ==
Lozoff is the author of We're All Doing Time: A Guide for Getting Free, It's a Meaningful Life: It Just Takes Practice (both with forewords by the 14th Dalai Lama) and other books. He has also written two books for children, The Wonderful Life of a Fly Who Couldn't Fly and A Little Boy in the Land of Rhyme.

== Allegations of abuse ==
In 2008, several ex-parolees and volunteers said in interviews with a reporter that Lozoff had been sexually and emotionally abusive at Kindness House. Lozoff did not deny many of the alleged incidents, and although he maintained his actions were not abusive, he stated that his radical beliefs and lifestyle made him a "terrible choice by God" as a leader of the community. Kindness House closed in 2006 as a result of the allegations.

== Death ==
Lozoff died in a motorcycle accident in Puna, Hawaii, on November 29, 2012.
