= Wauwinet, Massachusetts =

Wauwinet
- Village
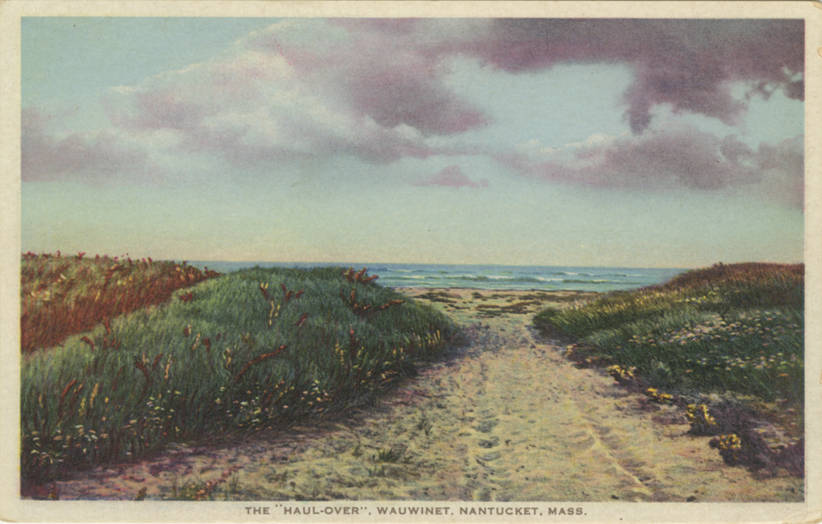

- Location within the state of Massachusetts
- Coordinates: 41°19′45″N 69°59′46″W
- Country: United States
- State: Massachusetts
- County: Nantucket
- Elevation: 3 ft (0.91 m)
- Time zone: UTC-5 (Eastern (EST))
  - Summer (DST): UTC-4 (EDT)
- ZIP codes: 02584
- GNIS feature ID: 616971

Wauwinet is a village in Nantucket, Massachusetts, United States. Its elevation is 3 feet (1 m). Named for an old local Indian chief, it lies on the northeastern coast of Nantucket Island, 4.7 miles (7.5 km) north-northwest of Siasconset. There is an upscale hotel and restaurant just north of the Gatehouse that features both harbor and oceanfront beach activities. Beyond Wauwinet is access by Four Wheel Drive only to Great Point lighthouse and Coatue.
