= The Dhamma Brothers =

- Directed by: Jenny Phillips; Andrew Kukura; Anne Marie Stein
- Release date: 2007
- Running time: 76 minutes
- Country: United States
- Language: English

The Dhamma Brothers is a documentary film released in 2007 about a prison meditation program at Donaldson Correctional Facility near Bessemer, Alabama. The film features four inmates, all convicted of murder, and includes interviews with guards, prison officials, local residents and other inmates, and reenactments of their crimes. The soundtrack includes music by Low, New Order and Sigur Rós.

The film was directed by Jenny Phillips, a cultural anthropologist and psychotherapist; Andrew Kukura, a documentary filmmaker; and Anne Marie Stein, a film-school administrator. In 2008 Phillips released Letters from the Dhamma Brothers: Meditation Behind Bars (ISBN 1-92870-631-2), a book based on follow-up letters with the inmates.

The Dhamma Brothers has been compared with another documentary, Doing Time, Doing Vipassana (1997), which documented a large-scale meditation program at Tihar Jail in India with over a thousand inmates using the same meditation retreat format.

== Meditation program ==
Director Jenny Phillips, Vipassana teacher Jonathan Crowley and Dr. Deborah Marshall were largely responsible for the meditation program's inception at the prison. Phillips had previously studied prison culture in Massachusetts. In 1999, she heard that prisoners at Donaldson were practicing meditation and she then organized the first ten-day intensive retreat there in January 2002. Phillips believes that was the first time a ten-day retreat had been held in a United States maximum-security prison such as Donaldson. Previous US courses had been in county jails.

The meditation program taught was Vipassana meditation as taught by S.N. Goenka. The first ten-day intensive at the prison occurred in January 2002 with twenty inmates. The film includes material from the second ten-day intensive meditation retreat held in May 2002 with thirty seven inmates and a follow-up three-day retreat and interviews in January 2006. Each retreat consisted of 10 hours of daily meditation and was held in complete silence. Convicted murderer Grady Bankhead described the retreat as, "tougher than his eight years on Death Row."

== Reception ==
Jack Brown of the Valley Advocate rated the film four stars. Julia Wallace of the Village Voice said that the film contains "cheesy, half-assed re-enactments of the inmates' crimes."

The meditation program at Donaldson was temporarily stopped shortly after the second meditation retreat. According to New York Times reviewer Whitney Joiner this was because the chaplain had reservations about the program. In December 2005, the prison administration changed and the meditation program was allowed to begin again. The program has continued with only minor interruptions at Donaldson since that time. Vipassana programs at Donaldson and other North American prisons are organized by the North American Vipassana Prison Trust.

The film also includes interviews with local residents who provide statements about the meditation program, perceiving it as Buddhist. In an interview with NPR, Donaldson warden Gary Hetzel "says he's convinced it's not religious, and has encouraged staff members to take a meditation course to dispel misperceptions." The program is described as non-sectarian on the organization's website.

Studies by Stanford University, University of Washington and participating prisons have reported sharp declines in disciplinary action, violence, self-reported drug use and recidivism following implementation of the program.

=== Awards ===
- Tied for Best Feature Documentary at the Woods Hole Film Festival 2007
- NCCD PASS Award Winner 2007

== See also ==
- Satipatthana Sutta
- Vipassanā
- Vipassana Movement
- Doing Time, Doing Vipassana (1997)
