= Benevolent Organisation for Development, Health and Insight =

The Benevolent Organisation for Development, Health and Insight is a Non-Governmental Organisation that undertakes sustainable interventions to promote human rights, education, and health amongst disadvantaged people in low-income countries. Their activities are principally in India and Bangladesh. Their founding patron is the Dalai Lama and they had former projects in several countries, including in Tibet, most notably the revolving sheep bank.

BODHI's past projects include adult literacy programs, health clinics, and education, all illustrations of engaged Buddhism. More recently, BODHI has primarily supported works with minority populations in India and Bangladesh, especially of Chakmas and dalits.

They have partnerships with local organizations and their volunteers. BODHI, founded in 1989, is one of the first Buddhist-influenced development organisations founded and based in the West. It has two branches, in the U.S. and in Australia. Its advisory board includes

- Shelley Anderson
- Bob Brown
- Mila de Gimeno
- John Guillebaud
- Maurice King
- Christopher Queen
- David Rapport
- Sulak Sivaraksa
- the late Robert Aitken

It was co-founded by Dr Colin Butler and the late Susan Woldenberg Butler.
