= Rehabilitation (penology) =

Process to re-integrate a person into society

Rehabilitation is the process of re-educating criminal offenders and preparing them to re-enter society. The goal is to address the underlying root causes of crime in order to prevent recidivism once inmates are released from prison. It generally involves psychological approaches which target the cognitive distortions associated with specific kinds of crime committed by individual offenders, but it may also entail more general education like reading skills and career training.

== Methods ==
A successful rehabilitation of a prisoner is also helped if convicted persons:

- are not placed in health-threateningly bad conditions, enjoy access to medical care and are protected from other forms of serious ill-treatment,
- are able to maintain ties to the outside world,
- learn new skills to assist them with working life on the outside,
- enjoy clear and detailed statutory regulations clarifying the safeguards applicable and governing the use and disposal of any record of data relating to criminal matters,
- in some cases are treated chemically,
- and receive longer prison sentences.

== By region ==
=== Norway ===
Norway's prison system is based on the principle of normalization and away from retribution to focus on rehabilitation. Inmates have access to amenities they would have outside of prison, such as an exclusive mini fridge, flat-screen TV, private bathroom, and access to outdoor environment. This, along with a shared kitchen and living area "to create a sense of family" among inmates and the absence of traditional prison uniforms contributes to Norway's rehabilitative normalcy system. The prison's structure is composed of Units A, B and C, with Unit A housing those in need of psychiatric or medical attention, thus being the most prohibitive of the three. Halden fengsel, referred to as the "world's most humane maximum-security prison", embodies the country's goal of reintegration by aiding inmates in sorting out housing and employment before leaving the prison. Rehabilitative measures involve education, job training, workshops to acquire a trade, and therapy along with the humane treatment they receive from personnel who have to complete three years of training to become prison guards.

The effectiveness of Norway's methods is evident as they hold one of the lowest rates of reimprisonment after 2 years at 18% as of 2018, while the recidivism rate of re-charging for an offense during 5 years is 49.6% for property theft, 46.8% for violence, and 31.7% for sexual offenses as of 2017. Norway's Correctional Service unofficial motto is "Better out than in" that is in view with their rehabilitative system as a justice to society by integrating inmates as functioning members of society upon release.

=== India ===
Vipassanā 10-day meditation courses were first taught in prisons in India in 1975. They have since been conducted in the US (1997–present), UK (1998), Spain (2003), Israel (2007) and Ireland (2015). Vipassana meditation aims to reduce negative mental states such as anger and aggression, and provide a path to inner peace.

=== Europe ===
As established by the Council of Europe committee of ministers, "a crime policy aimed at crime prevention and the social reintegration of offenders should be pursued and developed".

"The European Court of Human Rights, also, has stated in various judgments that, while punishment remains one of the aims of imprisonment, the emphasis in European penal policy is now on the rehabilitative aim of imprisonment, particularly towards the end of a long prison sentence. ... A prospect of release is necessary, because human dignity requires that there must be a chance for a prisoner to atone for his offence and move towards rehabilitation. A review system is also needed because, over the course of a very long sentence, the balance between the grounds of detention (punishment, deterrence, public protection and rehabilitation) can shift to the point that detention can no longer be justified."

=== Germany ===
Per the German constitution, "Everyone has the right to life and to inviolability of his person. The freedom of the individual is inviolable. These rights may only be encroached upon pursuant to a law".

=== Italy ===
Per the Italian constitution, "Punishment cannot consist in treatment contrary to human dignity and must aim at rehabilitating the condemned".

=== United Kingdom ===
The Rehabilitation of Offenders Act 1974 of the UK Parliament enables some criminal convictions to be ignored after a rehabilitation period.

=== United States ===
The United States Code states that sentencing judges shall make imprisonment decisions "recognizing that imprisonment is not an appropriate means of promoting correction and rehabilitation".

In 2015 a number of reformers, including Koch family foundations, the ACLU, the Center for American Progress, Families Against Mandatory Minimums, the Coalition for Public Safety, and the MacArthur Foundation, announced a bipartisan resolution to reform the criminal justice system in the United States. Their efforts were lauded by President Obama who noted these reforms will improve rehabilitation and workforce opportunities for those who have served their sentences.

Over the last few decades, the United States prison population has increased significantly. While prisons are considered punishment, they also are intended to have the purpose of future crime prevention. A recent study found that of $74 billion total spent on incarceration among federal, state and local prisons, less than 1% of that was spent on prevention and treatment. Incarceration not only harms the individual as intended, but also has unintended negative effects on the inmate's family, community, and overall society. Inmate education has been shown to reduce recidivism. Evidence shows that inmates overwhelmingly take advantage of education programs if they are available to them and if they can afford them. A recent study showed the earning a GED while incarcerate reduced recidivism rates by 14% for those under 21, and 5% for those over 21. Substance abuse is also a major issue in the prison system. Between 1996 and 2006, despite a modest population increase of 12%, the number of incarcerated individuals rose by 33% and the number of substance-abusing individuals rose by 43%. Existing treatment programs have shown solid evidence that drug treatment programs, along with support after release, are effective at reducing recidivism. Emotional and mental health counseling is a core component of successful inmate rehabilitation. Without the proper innate motivation and desire from the inmate, attempts to educate or assist with substance abuse are less effective. A study revealed that more than half of those incarcerated had a mental health problem, defined as a recent history or symptoms of a mental health problem within the previous 12 months. California's juvenile justice system is based on rehabilitation instead of punishment.

== Psychopathy and recidivism ==
Criminal recidivism is highly correlated with psychopathy. The psychopath is defined by an uninhibited gratification in criminal, sexual, or aggressive impulses and the inability to learn from past mistakes. Individuals with this disorder gain satisfaction through their antisocial behavior and lack remorse for their actions.

Findings indicate psychopathic prisoners have 2.5 times higher probability of being released from jail than undiagnosed ones, even though they are more likely to recidivate.

It has been shown that punishment and behavior modification techniques do not improve the behavior of a psychopath. Psychopathic individuals have been regularly observed to become more cunning and better able to hide their behaviour. It has been suggested that traditional therapeutic approaches actually make psychopaths if not worse, then far more adept at manipulating others and concealing their behavior. They are generally considered to be not only incurable but also untreatable.

Psychopaths also have a markedly distorted sense of the potential consequences of their actions, not only for others, but also for themselves. They do not, for example, deeply recognize the risk of being caught, disbelieved or injured as a result of their behaviour.

== Criticism ==
Some criticisms of rehabilitative systems are that they can authorize lengthy restrictions of liberty (to allow time for diagnosis and treatment) and broad assumptions of governmental power over offenders' personalities. Moreover, due process concerns can be implicated by a lack of traditional safeguards of defendants' procedural rights in rehabilitative processes. Some rehabilitative programs, such as drug courts, have also been criticized for widening the net of penal control by sentencing more defendants to prison for violations of treatment regimes than would have gone to prison in the absence of those programs.

Some types of rehabilitation programs were found ineffective in decreasing recidivism.

== See also ==
- Antisocial personality disorder
- Diversion program
- Exodus Ministries
- Koestler Trust
- Susanna Meredith
- Prisoners' rights
- Rehabilitation policy
- Social integration
- Yellow Ribbon Project
