= Florence Dolphyne =

Ghanaian academic and linguist

Florence Abena Dolphyne
- Born: Florence Abena Akesson; 1938 (age 87–88); Gold Coast
- Occupations: Linguist; Lecturer
- Years active: 1965 to 2001
- Known for: First female University Professor in Ghana
- Title: Professor
- Spouse: Kofi Dolphyne

Academic background
- Education: University of Ghana
- Alma mater: University of Ghana (BA); School of Oriental & African Studies (PhD)

Florence Abena Dolphyne (born in 1938) is a Ghanaian linguist and academic. She was the first female professor and first female pro-vice chancellor of the University of Ghana.

== Early life and education ==
Florence Dolphyne hails from Akyinakrom in the Ejisu-Juabeng District of the Ashanti Region. Her primary school education was at the Wenchi Methodist Primary School. She continued at Achinakrom Methodist Primary School as her family had moved there. She had to sell bread and kenkey after school due to the family's low income. Her next school was at Mmofraturo Girl's Boarding School at Kumasi in the Ashanti Region as her father was then a Methodist minister at Manso Atwere.

Florence Dolphyne had a senior high school education at the Wesley Girls Senior High School, Cape Coast. Her sixth form education was at Mfantsipim School at Cape Coast in the Central Region of Ghana. This was then a boys' school with a mixed sixth form section. She distinguished herself there by being the first female student to win a prize at the school.

Dolphyne entered the University of Ghana in 1958 and graduated with a BA(Hons) degree in English in 1961. She obtained a scholarship which enabled her to pursue postgraduate studies at the School of Oriental & African Studies of the University of London in the United Kingdom where she obtained her PhD in Phonetics and Linguistics in 1965 with a dissertation entitled "The phonetics and phonology of the verbal piece in the Asante dialect of Twi".

== Career ==
Florence Dolphyne was a lecturer and researcher. Her first job was as a teacher at the Labone Senior High School in Accra for a year. After her postgraduate studies, she joined the academic staff of the University of Ghana in September 1965. She was one of the founding members of the Department of Linguistics and Ghanaian Languages of the University of Ghana. She was joined by one other Ghanaian, Lawrence Boadi and some expatriates, Alan Duthie, Mrs. McCallien, Lindsay Criper and Helmut Truteneau. She rose to become the Head of the Linguistics Department, a position she held on two separate occasions. She also became Senior Tutor and Warden of Volta Hall, the only female hall of residence at the time. Florence Dolphyne was appointed Professor of Linguistics in 1996. She also served as Dean of the Faculty of Arts at the university. She was awarded an honorary doctorate (D.Litt) by the University of Ghana in 2004.

== Other activities ==
Florence Dolphyne was a founding member, with Mary Esther Kropp Dakubu and others, of the Linguistic Circle of Accra in 1967, which evolved into the Linguistic Association of Ghana. She was also involved with the West African Linguistics Society and served as its president.

Florence Dolphyne has been the chairperson of the National Council for Women and Development in Ghana. She has also been one of the commissioners who sat on the National Reconciliation Commission (2002 to 2004) which looked into the effects of military rule on people in Ghana. She has also been first and second Vice President of the Bible Society of Ghana. She was also a member of the Methodist University College Council and has been a Conference Member of Methodist Church, Ghana since 1999.

Dolphyne has also held visiting scholar positions at various institutions including University of Ibadan in Nigeria, Fourah Bay College in Sierra Leone, Michigan State University and University of California, Los Angeles in the United States. She is a Fulbright Senior Scholar. She has been the Chairperson of the Ghana Education Service between 2002 and 2006. She has also been a board member of the Ghana Education Trust Fund and VALCO Trust Fund.

== Honours ==
Florence Dolphyne was the first woman to be appointed a Professor in Ghana. She was the first female pro-vice chancellor of the University of Ghana as well.

The University of Ghana organised an event themed “New Frontiers in Language Studies in Ghana” on the occasion of her 80th birthday to honour her.

A special issue of the Ghana Journal of Linguistics dedicated to Professor Dolphyne appeared in 2018.

== Family ==
Florence Dolphyne was the first surviving child born to her parents. Her father was a Methodist minister from the Nzema people of Esiama in the Western Region of Ghana. Her mother was from Achinakrom near Ejisu. She had a sister and three brothers. She married Kofi Dolphyne, an aircraft engineer whom she met in London.

== Some publications ==
- Dolphyne, Florence Abena (1 January 1988). The Akan (Twi-Fante) Language - Its Sound Systems and Tonal Structure. Ghana Universities Press. ISBN 978-9964301590.
- Dolphyne, Florence Abena (20 October 1998). A Comprehensive Course in Twi (Asante) for the Non-Twi Learner. Ghana Universities Press. ISBN 978-9964302450.
- Dolphyne, Florence Abena (5 September 2000). The Emancipation of Women: An African Perspective. Ghana Universities Press. ISBN 978-9964301880.

== See also ==
- Mary Esther Kropp Dakubu
- Alan Stewart Duthie

== Relevant literature ==
- Machado-Guichon, M. (2023). Reimagining African womanhood in an unjust world order: Exploring the writings of Ghanaian women’s rights advocates, 1970s–1980s. Africa (Cambridge University Press), 93(2), 273-292. doi:10.1017/S0001972023000244
