= Buddhism in France =

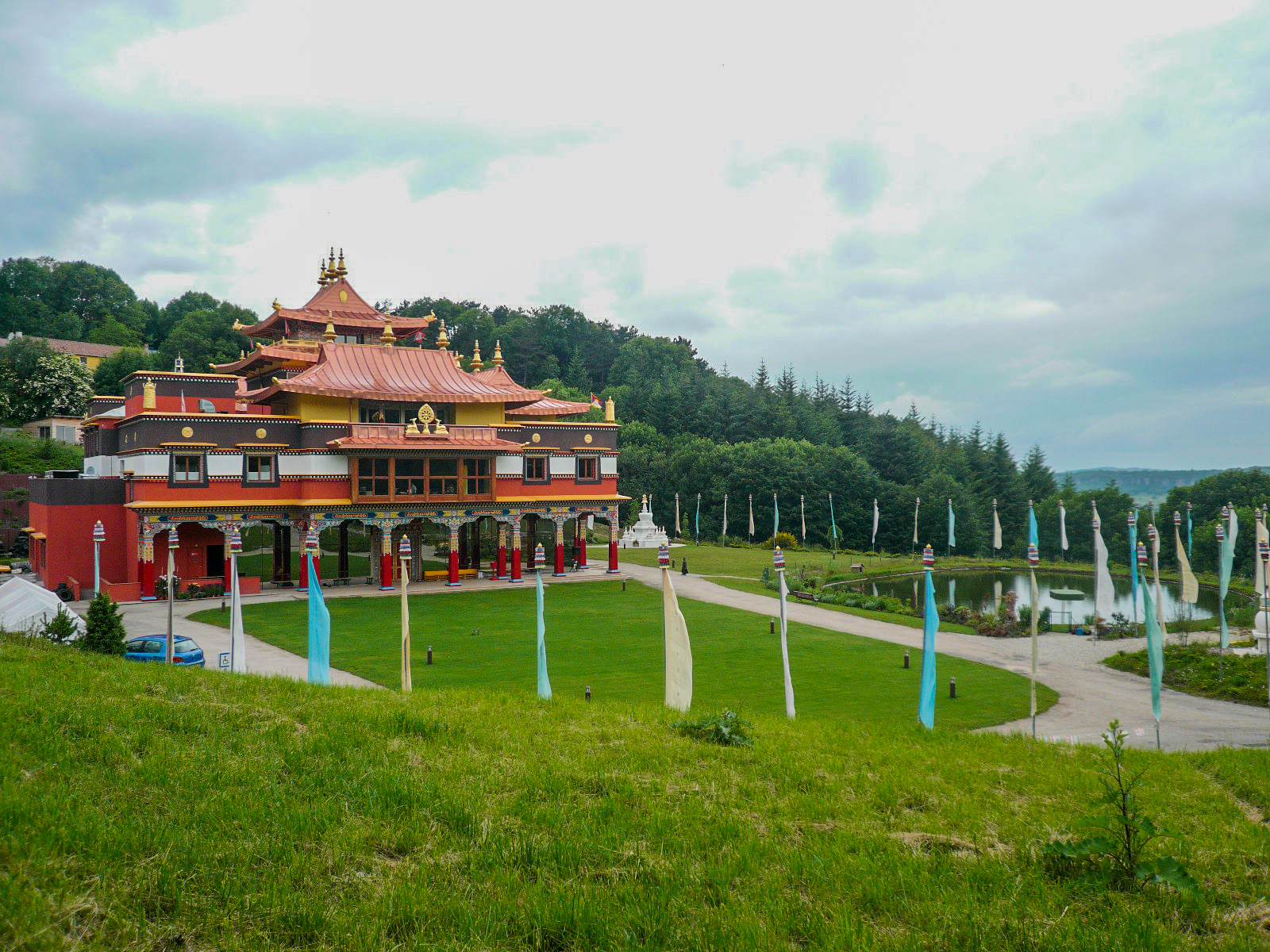
Lerab Ling, in Roqueredonde, Occitanie.

Buddhism (Note: French: Bouddhisme en France) is the third largest religion in France, after Christianity and Islam.

France has over two hundred Buddhist meditation centers, including about twenty sizable retreat centers in rural areas. The Buddhist population mainly consists of Chinese, Vietnamese, Lao, Cambodian, Korean and Japanese immigrants, with a substantial minority of native French converts and "sympathizers." The rising popularity of Buddhism in France has been the subject of considerable discussion in the French media and academy in recent years.

== Demographics ==
In the early 1990s, the French Buddhist Union (UBF, founded in 1986) estimated there to be 600,000 to 650,000 Buddhists in France, with 150,000 French converts among them. In 1999, sociologist Frédéric Lenoir estimated there are 10,000 converts and up to 5 million "sympathizers," although other researchers have questioned these numbers. A 1997 opinion poll counted as sympathizers young people who feel "an intellectual affinity with Buddhism or expressed a sympathy to a Buddhist worldview."

About three quarters of Buddhists in France come from Asian countries, especially Southeast Asia, and mainly practice Theravada Buddhism. In 2013, the ethnologist Cécile Campergue indicated that "it is usual to distinguish two Buddhisms in the West: an 'ethnic' Buddhism, mainly represented by Asian immigrants, and a conversion Buddhism intended for Westerners such as Tibetan Buddhism. The figures for converted Buddhists are still uncertain (it is difficult to count them because there is no written record of their conversion). According to the Buddhist Union of France, France has a million practicing Buddhists, including 700,000 of Asian origin and 300,000 of French origin (some speak of double or even triple). A little more than a quarter of them, in increasing progression, are originating in France and practicing mainly Zen or Tibetan Buddhism. They are mostly recent converts."

== History ==
Alexandra David-Néel was an important early French Buddhist. Best known for her 1924 visit to Tibet, including Lhasa, she wrote more than 30 books about Buddhism, philosophy, and her travels. In 1911 David-Néel traveled to India to further her study of Buddhism. She was invited to the royal monastery of Sikkim, where she met Maharaj Kumar (crown prince) Sidkeon Tulku. She became Sidkeong's "confidante and spiritual sister" (according to Ruth Middleton), and perhaps his lover (Foster & Foster). She also met the 13th Dalai Lama twice in 1912, and had the opportunity to ask him many questions about Buddhism—a feat unprecedented for a European woman at that time.

In the late 1960s and early 1970s, Buddhist teachers of various traditions began to visit France, as detailed below.

== Development of Chinese Buddhism in France ==
During the first half of the twentieth century, despite the constant flow of Chinese students into France, their number remained small. The total number reached some 2,000 to 3,000. Large-scale settlement of Chinese immigrants in France began in the 1970s. With the rapid growth of immigrants from mainland China to France in the 1980s, the landscape of the Chinese Buddhism has also changed over time.

Based on fieldwork research conducted in France, scholars of globalization distinguish between ethnolinguistic immigrant groups, transnational organizations, and communities centered on information technology. The first pattern involves immigrants transplantating local cultural traditions; for example, people from similar backgrounds establish a Buddha hall (佛堂) within the framework of their associations for collective religious activities. A prominent example is the Association des résidents en France d'origine indochinoise (Association of Residents in France of Indo-Chinese Origin, 法国华裔互助会). Its Buddha hall, established in 1989, is called the "Buddhist Altar of Mt. Xuanwu, the Pure Land of the Bodhisattva Avalokitesvara" (观世音菩萨玄武山佛教神坛).The second pattern features the transnational expansion of a large institutionalized organization centered on a charismatic leader, such as Fo Guang Shan (佛光山), Tzu Chi (慈濟) or the Amitabha Buddhist Society (淨宗學會). In the third pattern, religious globalization features the use of information technology such as websites, blogs, email lists and social media to promote direct interaction between members in different places, and between members and their leader. The Buddhist organization led by Jun Hong Lu is a typical example of this kind of group.

== Zen Buddhist communities ==
Taisen Deshimaru was a Japanese Zen Buddhist who founded numerous zendos in France. Thich Nhat Hanh, the Vietnamese-born Zen Buddhist nominated for the Nobel Peace Prize by Martin Luther King Jr., founded the Unified Buddhist Church (Eglise Bouddhique Unifiée) in France in 1969. The Plum Village Monastery in southern France is the headquarters of his international sangha.

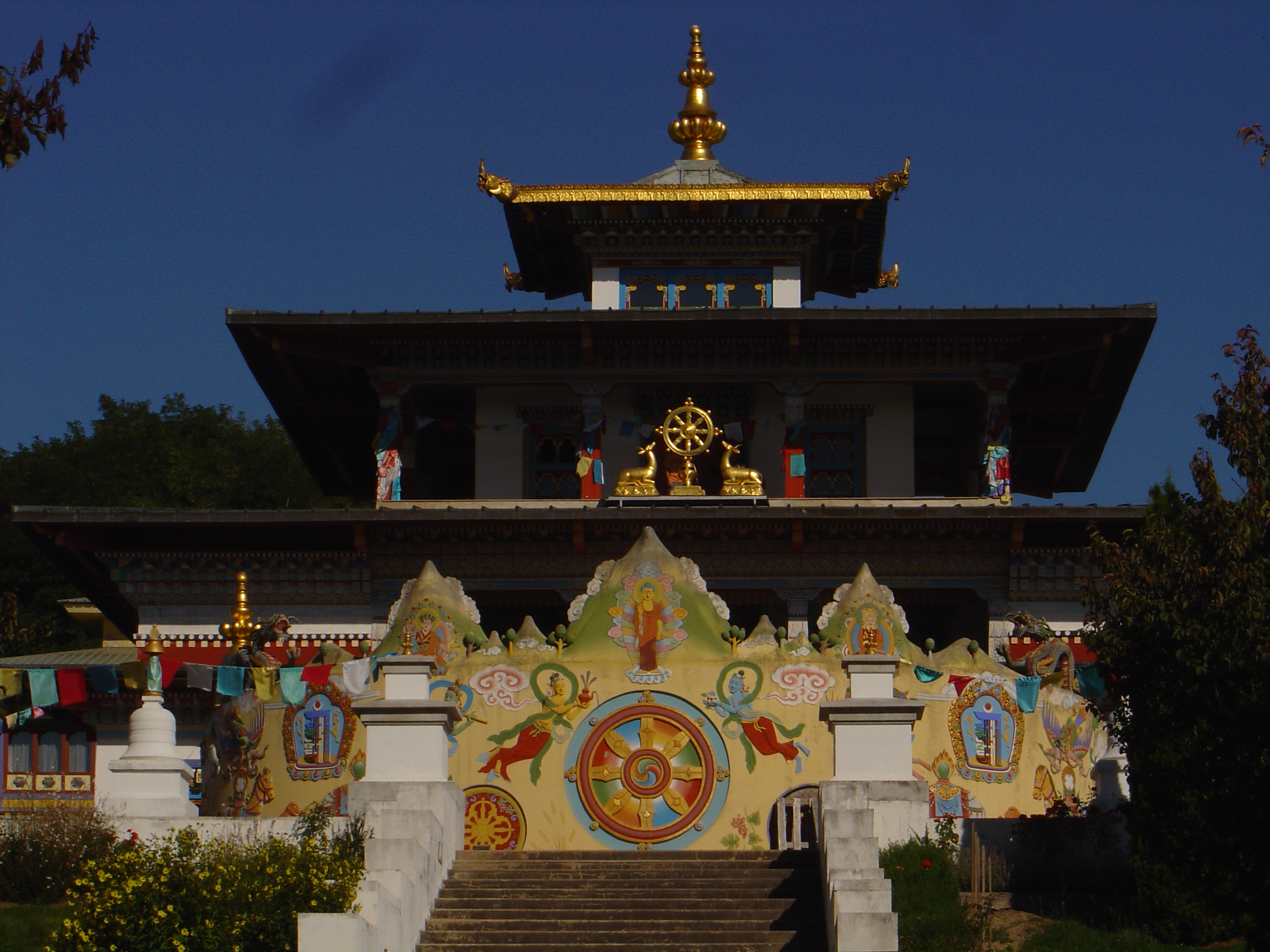
Temple of One Thousand Buddhas, in La Boulaye, Saône-et-Loire, Burgundy.

== Tibetan Buddhist communities ==
By the late 1990s, there were more than 140 Tibetan Buddhist meditation centers in France. The first Tibetan Buddhist communities were established in the early 1970s. Phendé Khenchen of the Sakya school (Ngor lineage) established his temple, E Wam Phendé Ling, in 1973. The Karmapa, head of the Karma Kagyu school, visited in 1975. Dudjom Rinpoche and Dilgo Khyentse Rinpoche visited Dordogne, where they established retreat centers with the help of Pema Wangyal Rinpoche. The latter's father, Kangyur Rinpoche, was among the first lamas to take western disciples. Dudjom Rinpoche later moved to France, where he died.

Kalu Rinpoche visited France in 1971, 1972 and 1974 and in 1976 led the first traditional three-year retreat for Westerners. An estimated sixty percent of the centers and monasteries in France are affiliated with the Kagyu school. The Dalai Lama visited France in 1982.

There are about twenty retreat centres representing all the different schools, as well as many town-based dharma centres under the direction of Tibetan Buddhist teachers. Dhagpo Kundreul Ling in Auvergne is said to be the biggest Buddhist monastery outside Asia.

Until the mid-1990s, there were only a few dozen ordained French monks and nuns. There are now at least 300, most of them trained at one the two monasteries in Auvergne.

A prominent French monk in the Tibetan Buddhist tradition is Matthieu Ricard, a longtime student of Dilgo Khyenste Rinpoche. The son of philosopher Jean-Francois Revel, Ricard has published books on Buddhism.

== Media and national interest ==
"Wisdom of Buddhism", a weekly French TV program, draws about 250,000 viewers, according to the Buddhist Union of France.

Philosopher Luc Ferry, appointed Minister of Youth and Education in 2002, published an article in Le Point magazine in which he asked, "Why this Buddhist wave? And why particularly in France, a very Catholic country in the past? ... In this time of de-Christianization, Buddhism has furnished to the West a rich and interesting alternative."
