= Mary Esther Kropp Dakubu =

American linguist based in Ghana

- Born: Mary Esther Kropp; 27 April 1938; Boston, Massachusetts, US
- Died: 17 November 2016 (aged 78); Boston, Massachusetts

Academic background
- Education: University of Pennsylvania (MA); School of Oriental and African Studies, University of London (PhD)
- Thesis: A comparative study of Ga and Adangme with special reference to the verb (1968)
- Doctoral advisor: David Dalby

Academic work
- Discipline: Linguist
- Sub-discipline: Ghanaian languages
- Institutions: University of Ghana

Mary Esther Kropp Dakubu (27 April 1938, in Boston, Massachusetts – 17 November 2016, in Boston, Massachusetts) was an American linguist based in Ghana, known for her work on Ghanaian languages. She was professor emerita at the Institute of African Studies at the University of Ghana, where she had been affiliated since 1964.

== Education and career ==
Kropp Dakubu earned her M.A. from the University of Pennsylvania in 1962. In 1964 she was appointed a Research Fellow in the Institute of African Studies at the University of Ghana. She earned her PhD in West African Languages from the School of Oriental and African Studies (SOAS), University of London, in 1968, with a dissertation entitled, "A comparative study of Ga and Adangme with special reference to the verb." She returned to Ghana after completing her PhD, and spent the remainder of her career (and her life) at the University of Ghana. She was promoted to the rank of Senior Research Fellow at the Institute of African Studies in 1972, to Associate Professor in 1982, and to Full Professor in 1987. She was the Deputy Director of the Institute of African Studies from 1987 to 1989. In July 2010, the University of Ghana appointed her Professor Emerita in recognition of her continued scholarship even in retirement.

She dedicated her career to the study of Ghanaian languages, writing many linguistic studies of topics in individual Ghanaian languages, as well as editing a standard reference work on the Languages of Ghana. She was an active member of the West African Linguistics Society, the then Linguistics Circle of Accra, and the Linguistics Association of Ghana.

== Notable achievements ==
Kropp Dakubu was a founding member (in 1967), along with Florence Dolphyne and others, of the Linguistic Circle of Accra, which later became the Linguistics Association of Ghana, and she also served as President (1989–1993; 1996–2000) of the Linguistics Association of Ghana. She was the editor for the Papers in Ghanaian Linguistics which were the transactions of the Linguistic Circle of Accra and of the Ghana Journal of Linguistics, the journal of the Linguistics Association of Ghana. She was also a founding member of the West African Linguistics Society (WALS) which was established at Legon in 1965.

Throughout her long working life, she held visiting positions in many universities across the world, including NTNU Trondheim, Indiana University, Hamburg University and Bayreuth University.

== Selected publications ==
- Ameka, Felix K and Mary E. Kropp Dakubu, eds. 2008. Aspect and Modality in Kwa languages. Amsterdam: John Benjamins.
- Kropp Dakubu, Mary E. 1970. The categories of the Ga verbal group. Journal of African Languages 9: 70–76.
- Kropp Dakubu, Mary E. 1986. Downglide, floating tones and non WH-questions in Ga and Dangme. In The phonological representation of suprasegmentals, ed. by K. Bogers, H. van der Hulst and M. Mous, 153–173. Dordrecht: Foris.
- Kropp Dakubu, Mary E., ed. 1988. The Languages of Ghana. reprinted in 2016. Routledge Revivals. ISBN 9781138926202
- Kropp Dakubu, Mary E. 1997. Korle meets the sea: A sociolinguistic history of Accra. Oxford University Press. ISBN 9780195060614
- Kropp Dakubu, Mary E. 2004. Ga clauses without syntactic subjects. Journal of African Languages and Linguistics 25: 1-40.
- Kropp Dakubu, Mary E. 2013. Dangme-English Dictionary with English-Dangme Glossary - Draft. Legon.

== See also ==
- Florence Dolphyne
- Alan Stewart Duthie
