= Katharine Barnwell =

British trainer of Bible translators (1938-2025)

- Born: 9 August 1938; London, United Kingdom
- Died: 29 September 2025 (aged 87)
- Education: University of St. Andrews (MA, 1960); University of London (PhD, 1970)

Katharine Barnwell (9 August 1938 – 29 September 2025) was a British missionary who worked in Nigeria as a Bible translator. She established methods of training local people to translate into their own languages, and authored an influential book on Bible translation principles considered the "gold standard" manual for training translators. She has been called "one of the most influential missionaries that ever lived."

== Early life ==
Barnwell was born to Frederick Reginald Lowry Barnwell and Norah Manning Powell in London on 9 August 1938. Her father was a civil engineer who worked on railways, serving the British government during World War II in North Africa, Italy and France. She was a child during the Blitz, and later during the war and after lived in a variety of places in England. While attending university at St Andrews, she became a committed Christian. She heard a Wycliffe speaker talk about the needs of people without the Scriptures in their own language, and felt this was a calling for her.

== Missionary and translation work ==
After finishing Wycliffe linguistic training, Barnwell went to Nigeria in 1964 and began learning the Mbembe language. She was cut off from communication with the outside world by the Nigerian Civil War and walked from the conflict area into Cameroon.

In the mid 1970s, when almost all other expatriate linguists were required to leave Nigeria, she began training locals to translate into their own languages. She produced the first version of her book, Bible Translation: An Introductory Course in Translation Principles. This book states three principles of translation: A translation must be clear, accurate and natural. This book and her training methods have been used in many places besides Nigeria to train new translators.

She became the chief trainer for the Nigerian Bible Translation Trust and started an approach where teams from several related languages would be trained and start out working together. She later launched a program where a group working in related languages would learn to translate the Gospel of Luke, then translate the script of the 1979 film Jesus.

This training and empowerment of local people has been called a revolution in Bible translation, and is credited with training several thousand translators and launching "today's huge growth in Bible translation".

== Late career ==
Barnwell served for several years as International Translation Coordinator with SIL, then was a Senior Translation Consultant for many years, well into her 80s, and she continued to support the Mbembe language community. She died on 29 September 2025.

== Publications ==
- A grammatical description of Mbembe, Adun Dialect, a Cross River language (Thesis). University of London, School of Oriental and African Studies. 1969.
- Bible Translation: An Introductory Course in Translation Principles. Summer Institute of Linguistics. 1986. ISBN 978-0-88312-651-6. This has been translated into other languages, including Portuguese: Tradução Bíblica, translated by Mary Daniel, 2007.

== See also ==
- Lynell Marchese Zogbo
- Missionary linguistics
