= West African Linguistic Society =

Academic non-profit society

West African Linguistic Society / Société de Linguistique de L'Afrique de l'Ouest
- Abbreviation: WALS / SLAO
- Formation: 1965; 61 years ago
- Type: Non-profitable Society of Academics.
- Region served: West Africa
- Members: All registered researchers on the languages and literatures of West Africa (1965)
- Official language: English, French and all indigenous languages of West Africa
- Owner: West African Researchers in the languages and literatures of the Sub-region
- President: Lendzemo Constantine Yuka
- Key people: Prof. Lendzemo Constantine Yuka, Dr. Djibril Silue, Prof. Ayo Bamgbgose, Prof. Ben Elugbe, Prof. Firmin Ahoua, Prof. Adams Bodomo, Prof. Francis Egbokhare, Prof. Akinlabi Akinbiyi, Prof. Gbeto Flavien, Prof. Harrison Adeniyi, Prof. Emelda Udo, Prof Lynell Zogbo
- Main organ: Members of Council
- Publication: Journal of West African Languages
- Subsidiaries: Linguistic Association of Nigeria, Linguistic Association of Ghana, Linguistic Association of Cote d'Ivoire, Linguistic Association of Benin
- Revenue: (Membership Annual Dues)
- Website: www.westafricanlinguisticsociety.org

The West African Linguistic Society (French: Société de Linguistique de l’Afrique de l’Ouest)(abbreviated as WALS or SLAO) is an academic scholarly society formed in 1965 to encourage research in the West African languages and literature. Every other year, WALS hosts a conference for its members to meet and discuss current issues in African linguistic research. The society also publishes the Journal of West African Languages. Its current headquarters are in Benin City, Nigeria.

== Purpose ==
Language families of West Africa

WALS fosters research on West African languages and provides a permanent forum for interaction and exchange of ideas among African-language scholars. WALS additionally aims to foster conversation among language boundaries between Anglophone and Francophone West Africa.

WALS is a non-profit organization. Throughout its establishment, WALS has helped develop programs in African linguistics at a variety of universities in the region.

The society has a number of working groups that focus on more specific topics, such as French and English language education and African short story creation.

== Programming ==
WALS hosts a biennial congress on West African linguistic research. Past locations of the congress meeting have been in numerous countries, such as Ghana, Cameroon, and Nigeria. As its members often either speak English or French, hosting countries alternate between Anglophone and Francophone ones.

WALS is now a member of the Federation Internationale des Langues et Literatures Modernes (FILLM).

== Membership ==
Membership of WALS is largely drawn from academics and researchers in universities and research institutes. Members primarily come from West African countries, but include scholars from all over the world, including countries such as the United States and Austria. Professor Lendzemo Constantine Yuka of the University of Benin is the current president of WALS.

Notable members have included:

- Joseph Greenberg, American linguist who classified West African languages
- Kay Williamson, British linguist who specialized in Ijo languages of south-eastern Nigeria
- Adams Bodomo, professor of African linguistics at the University of Vienna
- Lynell Zogbo, Bible translator of African languages
- Francis Egbokhare, Nigerian academic and linguist
- Imelda Udoh, professor of linguistics specializing in phonology at University of Uyo

== Relevant Literature ==
- Lendzemo Constantine Yuka and Adams Bodomo. 2022. "Towards the development of linguistics in West Africa: The contributions of the West African Linguistic Society." Beyond Babel: Scholarly organizations and the study of languages and literature, Tom Clark (Editor), pp. 43-58. John Benjamins.
