= Alan Stewart Duthie =

- Born: 19 May 1938; Dundee, Scotland
- Died: 6 July 2013 (aged 75); Legon, Ghana
- Occupations: Lecturer, linguist
- Years active: 1964–2009
- Title: professor
- Spouse: Matilda
- Children: 1
- Parent(s): Stewart Duthie; Evelyn Mary Greig

Academic background
- Education: University of Manchester

Academic work
- Discipline: Linguistics
- Sub-discipline: Ghanaian languages
- Institutions: University of Ghana
- Notable students: Felix Ameka
- Main interests: Ewe linguistics

Alan Stewart Duthie (19 May 1938 – 6 July 2013) was a Scottish linguist and academic who settled and worked in Ghana all his adult life. He was a pioneer in linguistics at the University of Ghana, Legon, for 49 years.

== Early life and education ==
Alan Duthie was raised in Downfield area of Dundee, Scotland. His secondary school education at the High School of Dundee.

He obtained a Master of Arts (MA) in History of Greek Language, non-dramatic Greek Poetry, Hebrew and Moral Philosophy at the University of St. Andrews between 1956 and 1960. He then went on to the University of Edinburgh where he completed a postgraduate Diploma in General Linguistics. He continued his postgraduate studies at the University of Manchester where he graduated in 1964 with a PhD in Linguistics. While working at the University of Ghana, he was an external student of the London University, obtaining a degree in Divinity.

== Academic career ==
Alan Duthie joined the Phonetics Unit in the Department of English at the University of Ghana, Legon in November 1964. He became part of the team of Linguists who developed the unit into the Department of Linguistics. The others were Mrs McCallien, Lindsay Criper, along with a Ghanaian, Lawrence Boadi. Helmut Truteneau and another Ghanaian, Florence Dolphyne joined later. Duthie was the first lecturer to be appointed directly to the department in 1964. He was key in building up the department to run both undergraduate and postgraduate programmes. During the economic depression in the early 1980s, he and Florence Dolphyne were instrumental in maintaining the department. He had two spells as the head of the Linguistics Department. The first was between 1986 and 1989 and then also from 1991 to 1993. The courses he taught include Phonetics, Sociolinguistics, English Phonology, English Syntax and Semantics, Theory of Translation, Seminar in Semantics, and Linguistics of Ewe. He also has many publications to his name. At the time of his death, he was reputed to have taught and mentored many who later became academic members of staff of the Department of Linguistics with the exception of the younger ones. He was at his office on the day before his death.

Felix Ameka, a linguist who specialises in West African languages is one of his former students at the University of Ghana.

== Religious activities ==
Duthie taught Bible Translation, New Testament Greek and Old Testament Hebrew at the Maranatha Bible College at Sowutuom in Accra. He was involved in organising workshops of the Ghana Institute of Linguistics, Literacy and Bible Translation. He was also one of the co-founders of the Legon Interdenominational Church. He has been the editor of the Daily Guide, which is the daily Bible reading notes published by the Scripture Union in Ghana.

== Other work ==
Alan Duthie served as an examiner for the British Council in Ghana.

== Family ==
Alan was the only child of Stewart Duthie and Evelyn Mary Greig. His childhood home was in the Downfield area of Dundee. He settled in Ghana and eventually married a Ghanaian lady, Matilda in 1993. They had one son, David. He lived in Ghana all his working life but regularly returned to his childhood home.

== Death ==
He fell ill on 5 July 2013 following a stomach ailment and was admitted to the Legon Hospital where he died the next day.

== Honours ==
- Alan S. Duthie Graduate Wing – This wing on the first floor of the De Graft Hanson Building is for the use of postgraduate linguistics students of the Department of Linugistics at the University of Ghana.

== Publications ==
- Duthie, Alan Stewart; Vlaardingerbroek, R. K. (1 January 1981). Bibliography of Gbe (Ewe, Gen, Aja, Xwla, Fon, Gun, etc.). Publications on and in the Language. Basler Afrika Bibliographien. ISBN 978-3-905141-18-4.
- Duthie, Alan Stewart (1 June 1985). Bible Translations and How to Choose Between Them. Attic Pr. p. 128. ISBN 978-0853644002.
- Duthie, Alan Stewart (1 January 1986). "Phonetic Features". In Bogers, Koen; van der Hulst, Harry; Mous, Marten (eds.). The Phonological Representation of Suprasegmentals. De Gruyter Mouton. pp. 337–358. doi:10.1515/9783110866292-018. ISBN 978-3110131093.
- Duthie, Alan Stewart (18 November 1994). How to Choose Your Bible Wisely (Bible Students) (2nd revised ed.). Send The Light. ISBN 978-0853646150.
- Duthie, Alan Stewart (1 January 2001). Introducing Ewe Linguistic Patterns: a Textbook of Phonology, Grammar, and Semantics. Ghana Universities Press. ISBN 978-9964302269.
- Duthie, Alan Stewart (2011). EWE ENCYCLOPEDIC DICTIONARY OF HEALTH. Legon: LEGON, DEPARTMENT OF LINGUISTICS, UNIVERSITY OF GHANA. ISBN 978-9988824181.
- Duthie, Alan Stewart (3 June 2015). "Chapter Four: Ewe". In Kropp Dakubu, Mary Esther (ed.). The Languages of Ghana (1st ed.). New York: Routledge. ISBN 978-1-138-92620-2. (first published in 1988 by KPI Limited in association with the International African Institute)

== See also ==
- Florence Dolphyne
- Mary Esther Kropp Dakubu
