= Journal of West African Languages =

- Discipline: Linguistics
- Language: English, French
- Edited by: Adams Bodomo

Publication details
- History: 1964-present
- Publisher: West African Linguistic Society
- Frequency: Biannually
- Open access: Open access

Standard abbreviations
- ISO 4: J. West Afr. Lang.

Indexing
- ISSN: 0022-5401
- LCCN: 64009419
- OCLC no.: 844072

Links
- Journal homepage

The Journal of West African Languages is a peer-reviewed academic journal dedicated to the study of West African languages. It is the official publication of the West African Linguistic Society.

== History ==
The journal was established in 1964 and up to volume 8 published by Cambridge University Press. It was subsequently taken over by the West African Linguistic Society. Editing and production were initially undertaken at the University of Ibadan, but production was later transferred to the Summer Institute of Linguistics beginning with volume 12. The Journal is in its 48th volume (as of 2021).

The journal is published in volumes of two issues per year (May and November). It is an open access journal, currently published only online.

The current editor-in-chief is Prof. Dr. Adams Bodomo (Department of African Studies, University of Vienna).

== Indexing and abstracting ==
The journal is abstracted and indexed in Abstracts in Anthropology, International Bibliography of the Social Sciences, Linguistic Bibliography, Linguistics Abstracts, Linguistics and Language Behavior Abstracts, MLA International Bibliography, and ErihPlus.
