= The Sikh Missionary Society UK =

British charity

The Sikh Missionary Society UK is a British charity (registered number 262404) based in Southall in West London. It was founded in 1969 to support and extend the work of three Sikhs, G.S.Sivia, G.S.Sidhu and Kirpal Singh Rai, working in Kent who had produced a free leaflet called "Guru Nanak for children".

The society purchased premises in Southall that same year and moved its operations there. It has focused on the support and education of young Sikhs in their religion as well as providing resources for schools and educational institutions.

== Aims ==
The Aims of the Sikh Missionary Society are:

- To Produce and distribute books on the Sikh Faith in English, Punjabi and other languages to enlighten the younger generation of Sikhs as well as non-Sikhs.
- To arrange classes, lectures, seminars, conferences, Gurmat camps and the celebration of holy Sikh events.
- To award prizes to children on the basis of their achievement and interest in the Sikh faith and Punjabi language.
- To make available Sikh posters, literature, music, educational videos, DVDs and multimedia CD-ROMs
