= Lynell Marchese Zogbo =

American linguist and Bible translation scholar

- Born: Lynell Marchese; February 15, 1948; San Diego, California, U.S.
- Died: March 7, 2026 (aged 78); Stockton, California, U.S.
- Education: University of California, Los Angeles (PhD, 1979)
- Occupations: Linguist; Bible translation consultant; academic
- Employer(s): SIL International (1972–1975), United Bible Societies (1985–2013)
- Known for: Kru languages research; Bible translation in francophone Africa
- Spouse: Georges Zogbo
- Children: 2

Lynell Marchese Zogbo (February 15, 1948 – March 7, 2026) was an American linguist and Bible translation scholar known for her foundational research on the Kru languages of Côte d'Ivoire and Liberia, and for her extensive career as a translation consultant with the United Bible Societies (UBS) across francophone West Africa. Over a career spanning more than four decades, she contributed to African linguistics, produced standard reference works on Kru languages, co-authored widely used UBS translator's handbooks (in English and French), and served as editor of Le Sycomore, the UBS journal for francophone Bible translators.

== Early life and education ==
Lynell Marchese was born on February 15, 1948, in San Diego, California, to Mario Marchese and Wanda Katherine Fortner.

She pursued graduate studies in linguistics at the University of California, Los Angeles (UCLA), where she completed her PhD in 1979 with a dissertation titled Tense/Aspect and the Development of Auxiliaries in the Kru Language Family, supervised by William Welmers and Sandra Thompson. The dissertation was subsequently published in revised form as a monograph by SIL International and the University of Texas at Arlington Press in 1986.

== Career ==
=== Linguistics and academic work ===
From 1972 to 1975, prior to completing her doctorate, Marchese served with SIL International in Côte d'Ivoire, where she carried out initial fieldwork on the Godié language, undertaking grammatical, phonological, and discourse analysis, producing literacy materials, and translating the Gospel of Mark. She continued fieldwork on Godié and the wider Kru language family in subsequent years, and was a research associate at the Institut de Linguistique Appliquée (ILA) at the Université d'Abidjan, where she produced the Atlas linguistique des langues kru: essai de typologie (1979; 2nd ed. 1983), a comprehensive typological survey of the Kru family.

In the early 1980s, she taught syntax and semantics at the University of Ilorin in Nigeria and at San Jose State University in California.

Her 1989 chapter "Kru" in John Bendor-Samuel's The Niger-Congo Languages: A Classification and Description of Africa's Largest Language Family became the standard reference overview of the Kru branch within the Niger-Congo family and continues to be widely cited in the field.

She continued to publish on Kru linguistics throughout her career, including work on noun class systems, central vowels, and ideophones, presenting at international forums such as the Annual Conference on African Linguistics (ACAL) and the conference Towards Proto-Niger-Congo in Paris.

=== Bible translation ===
Based in Abidjan, she served with UBS from 1985 until her retirement in 2013. Over those years, she advised translation teams not only in Côte d'Ivoire but in a number of neighbouring countries. She also contributed substantially to the UBS global Translation Consultant Training held in Bali in 2005.

She co-authored three volumes in the UBS Handbook Series, standard reference commentaries designed to assist Bible translators worldwide: A Handbook on Ecclesiastes (1997), A Handbook on the Song of Songs (1998), and A Handbook on Judges (2019), all with Graham S. Ogden. She also co-authored Hebrew Poetry in the Bible: A Guide for Understanding and for Translating with Ernst R. Wendland, first published in 2000 and issued in a second edition by UBS in 2020.

She served as editor of Le Sycomore, a peer-reviewed journal of Bible translation published by the United Bible Societies for the francophone translation community. The journal publishes articles on linguistics, exegesis, anthropology, translation theory, and Scripture use, with contributions primarily from Bible translators and consultants working in African languages. She also edited the French UBS handbook series and contributed to Lisons nos Langues, a publication of the Alliance Biblique de Côte d'Ivoire (ABCI).

She co-authored with Michel Kenmogne La traduction de la Bible et l'église: enjeux et défis pour l'Afrique francophone (2009; 2nd ed. Yaoundé and Nairobi: Éditions CLÉ / Wycliffe Global Alliance/AFA, 2015), an introductory textbook on Bible translation developed through the Francophone Initiative of SIL, UBS, and Wycliffe for use in theological seminaries across francophone Africa.

=== Later academic appointments ===
Following her retirement from UBS in 2013, Marchese Zogbo held several academic positions. She taught in a master's programme in Bible translation established jointly by SIL International, UBS, and FATEAC (Faculté de Théologie Évangélique Alliance Chrétienne) in Abidjan, where her teaching included translation, Hebrew discourse, Hebrew poetry, Old Testament exegesis, and curriculum development.

In South Africa, she was affiliated with the University of the Free State as a research associate and adjunct lecturer, and undertook graduate-level supervision through the South African Theological Seminary (SATS). She taught periodically at the Jerusalem Center for Bible Translation, offering courses in translation, Hebrew narrative, Hebrew poetry, and the Psalms, and continued writing handbooks for UBS.

== Personal life and death ==
Lynell Marchese married Georges Zogbo, and the couple lived in Abidjan, Côte d'Ivoire, for much of their married life. She was known widely in the African Bible translation community as "Mama Lynell" or "Docteure Zogbo."

Marchese Zogbo died on March 7, 2026, in California, following a battle with cancer. She was 78 years old.

== See also ==
- Bible translation
- Katharine Barnwell
- Kru languages
- United Bible Societies
- Niger-Congo languages
