= Manso Atwere =

- Interactive map of Manso Atwere
- Country: Ghana
- Region: Ashanti Region

Manso Atwere is a town in the Ashanti Region of Ghana. The town is known for the Mansoman Secondary School. The school is a second cycle institution.

== Demography. ==
Manso Atwere, also known as Atwidie, Manso Atwere, or Old Atwidia, is situated in the Africa/Middle East region, with a font code corresponding to this area. It lies at an elevation of 250 meters above sea level and has a population of 29,748.

The geographic coordinates of Manso Atwere are 6°28'0" N and 1°52'0" W in Degrees Minutes Seconds (DMS), or 6.46667° N and -1.86667° W in decimal degrees. Its UTM (Universal Transverse Mercator) position is XN21, and its Joint Operation Graphics (JOG) reference is NB30-07..
