= Missionary linguistics =

Study and description of languages by Christian missionaries

Missionary linguistics is linguistics done by Christian missionaries. It has a significant role in the History of linguistics.

== See also ==
- Bible translation
- Language documentation
- Language revitalization
