= Temple of One Thousand Buddhas =

Coordinates: 46.7557°N 4.1400°E

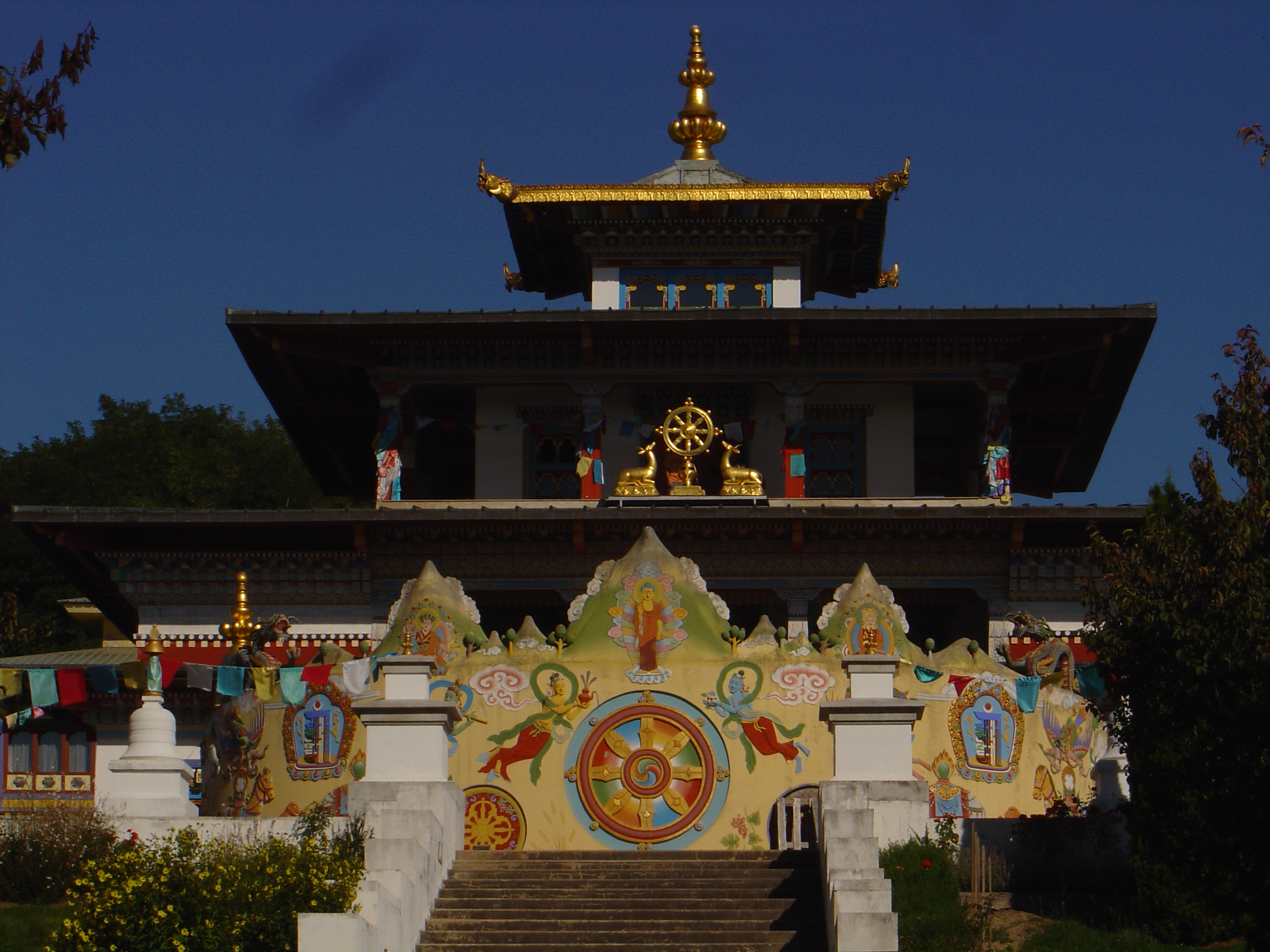
Temple of One Thousand Buddhas, in La Boulaye, Saône-et-Loire, Burgundy

The Temple of One Thousand Buddhas is a Tibetan Buddhist temple in the commune of La Boulaye, located in the French region of Burgundy. The temple, founded in 1987, follows the Karma Kagyu tradition. It lies in the middle of Dashang Kagyu Ling, a Buddhist retreat center established by the Tibetan lama Kalu Rinpoche in 1974.
