= Adams Bodomo =

African and Asian Studies academic

- Born: May 6, 1959 (age 67)

Academic background
- Education: University of Ghana, Norwegian University of Science and Technology

Academic work
- Discipline: Africa–China studies, African diaspora, African Linguistics
- Institutions: Norwegian University of Science and Technology, Stanford University, University of Hong Kong, University of Vienna

Adams B. Bodomo (born 1959) is a Ghanaian and Austrian Professor of African Linguistics and Literatures at the University of Vienna since 2013 with a research focus on Africa–China Studies and Linguistics. In 1988 he received a Master of Arts degree in linguistics from the University of Ghana and in 1997 a Ph.D. (Doctor Artium) in Linguistics/African Studies from the Norwegian University of Science and Technology (NTNU) on the thesis Paths and Pathfinders: Exploring the Syntax and Semantics of Complex Verbal Predicates in Dagaare and other Languages.

Bodomo previously taught at Stanford University, NTNU and the University of Hong Kong and is editor-in-chief of the Journal of West African Languages (JWAL). In 2017 the International Convention of Asia Scholars awarded him their ICAS Colleague's Choice Award book prize for his book Africans in China: Guangdong and Beyond (New York: Diasporic Africa Press, 2016).

== Selected publications ==
Bodomo published many scholarly articles and books, including:

- Paths and Pathfinders: Exploring the Syntax and Semantics of Complex Verbal Predicates in Dagaare and other Languages. Doctoral dissertation, Dept. of Linguistics, The Norwegian University of Science and Technology, Trondheim, Norway. 306 pages, 1997. ISBN 9788278610602.
- The Structure of Dagaare, Stanford Monographs in African Languages, CSLI publications, Stanford, USA, 1997. ISBN 9781575860770.
- The African trading community in Guangzhou: An emerging bridge for Africa–China relations, The China Quarterly 203 (2010) 693-707, Cambridge University Press. doi:10.1017/S0305741010000664.
- Africans in China : a sociocultural study and its implications on Africa-China relations, Cambria Press, Amherst, New York, 2012. ISBN 9781624993381.
- Africans in China: Guangdong and Beyond, New York: Diasporic Africa Press, 2016. ISBN 9781937306403.
- The globalization of foreign investment in Africa : The role of Europe, China and India, Emerald Publishing Limited, Bindgley, 2017. ISBN 9781787433588.
- with Augustine Agwuele (Editors), The Routledge handbook of African linguistics, Routledge, Abingdon, Oxon, 2020. Series: Routledge language handbooks. ISBN 9780367581527.
- with Hasiyatu Abubakari and Samuel Alhassan Issah, Handbook of the Mabia Languages of West Africa, Galda Verlag, Berlin, Germany, 2020. ISBN 978-3-96203-117-6.
- Linguistic pan-Africanism as a global future : reflections on the language question in Africa : University of Vienna, Austria : inaugural lecture, Ghana Academy of Arts and Sciences (GAAS), Accra, February 10, 2022, Galda Verlag, Glienicke, Berlin, 2022. ISBN 9783962032326.
