= La Boulaye =

- Commune
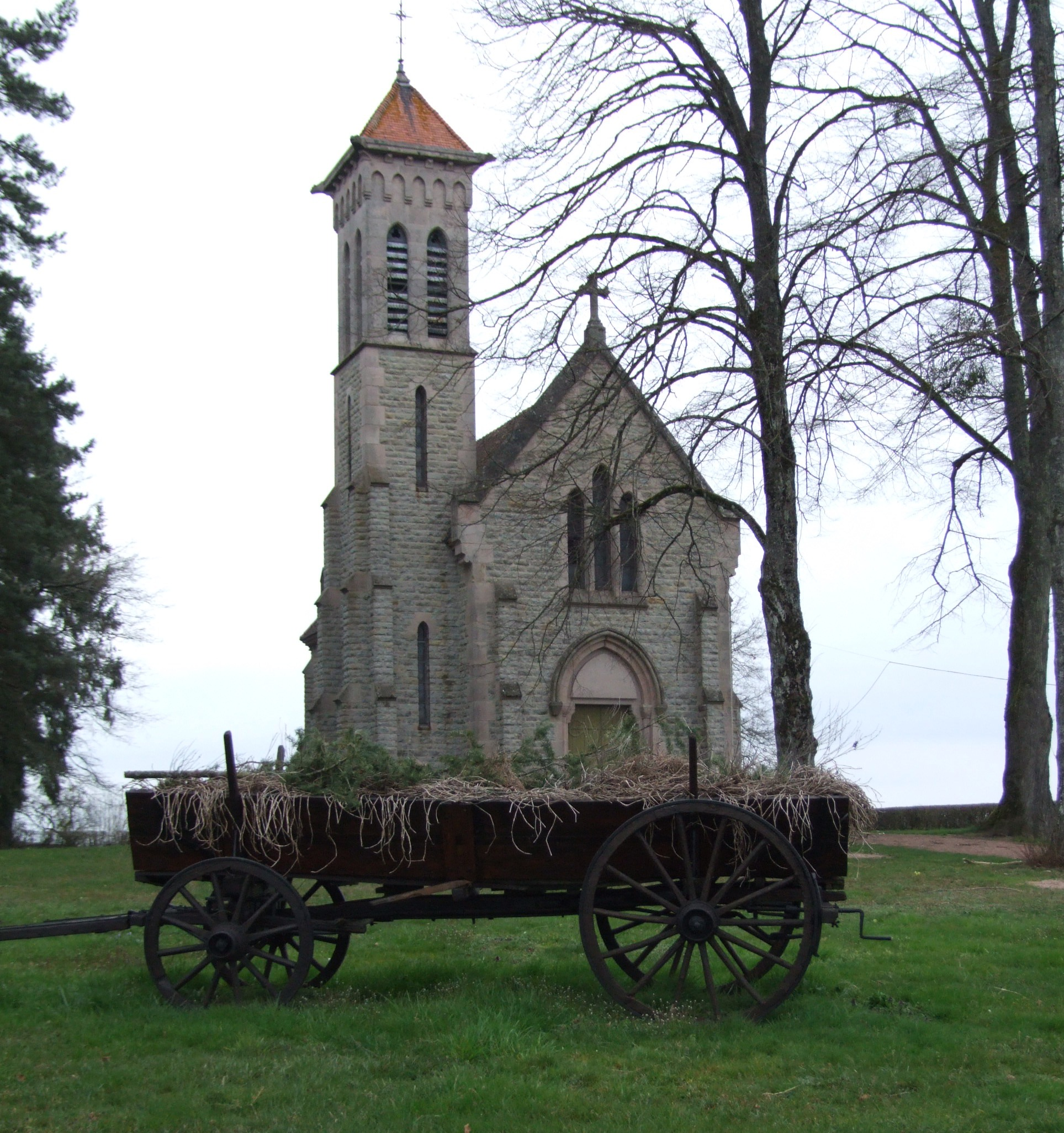
- The church in La Boulaye
- Location of La Boulaye
- Location within France Location within Bourgogne-Franche-Comté
- Coordinates: 46°44′50″N 4°07′44″E
- Country: France
- Region: Bourgogne-Franche-Comté
- Department: Saône-et-Loire
- Arrondissement: Autun
- Canton: Autun-2
- Area^{1}: 13.86 km^{2} (5.35 sq mi)
- Elevation: 266 m (873 ft)
- Highest elevation: 481 m (1,578 ft)
- Lowest elevation: 256 m (840 ft)
- Population (2023): 102
  - Density: 7.36/km^{2} (19.1/sq mi)
- Time zone: UTC+01:00 (CET)
  - Summer (DST): UTC+02:00 (CEST)
- INSEE/Postal code: 71046 /71320
- ^{1} French Land Register data, which excludes lakes, ponds, glaciers > 1 km^{2} (0.386 sq mi or 247 acres) and river estuaries.

La Boulaye (French pronunciation: [la bulɛ]) is a commune in the Saône-et-Loire department in the region of Bourgogne-Franche-Comté in eastern France.

== See also ==
- Communes of the Saône-et-Loire department
