= The Power of Forgiveness =

2008 film by Martin Doblmeier

- Directed by: Martin Doblmeier
- Produced by: Dan Juday; Adele Schmidt
- Cinematography: Brendan Galvin
- Edited by: Adele Schmidt
- Music by: John Keltonic, JDK music
- Release date: February 19, 2008 (United States)
- Running time: 78 minutes
- Country: United States
- Language: English

The Power of Forgiveness is a 2008 documentary film by Martin Doblmeier about the process of forgiveness. It features interviews with renowned Buddhist teacher Thich Nhat Hanh, Nobel Laureate Elie Wiesel, best-selling authors Thomas Moore and Marianne Williamson and others.

== Release and reception ==
The film was released in 2008, had its world premier at Dawn Breakers International Film Festival and was broadcast on television stations across the United States.

== Participants ==
- Thích Nhất Hạnh
- James A. Forbes
- Alexandra Asseily, whom expressed that the forgiveness should initiate forgiving ourselves first, and whom took the initiative of construct the Garden of Forgiveness in Beirut, which construction was hold due to 2006 Lebanon War
- Rev. Bill Shaw
- Robert Enright (Researcher on psychology of forgiveness)
- Donald Kraybill
- Marianne Williamson
- Elie Wiesel, whom was imprisoned in Auschwitz concentration camp, where his parents and sister died.
- Everett Worthington clinical psychologist and Professor of Psychology at Virginia Commonwealth University (VCU) and studied forgiveness since 1985.
- Kathleen Lawler-Row was head of the Department of Psychology at East Carolina University, where overseed the creation of a new doctoral program in health psychology.
- Rev. Lindon Harris, an episcopal priest whom chapel was St. Paul's Chapel.
- Dr. Fred Luskin, Project Director, Stanford Center for Research in Disease Prevention, Stanford University.
- Lynn McGuinn
- Diane Horning
- Rose Foti, the mother of a fireman whom could not believe that his son received the medal of honor after his dead during the fire in the Twin Towers and days later his remains were put in a landfill along with the remains of the rest of the victims.
- Sayidda Sadr, she was the sister of the peace activist Musa al-Sadr whom decide to visit the Arab world to expose that they should stop the fight between Christians and Muslims, since they were not the promoting the wars and only innocent people were dying, he disappeared in 1978 after a meeting in Libya.
- Thomas Moore whom considers that a person should not be forced to forgive if does not feels they want to forgive,
- Frederick A. DiBlasio (Clinical Use of Forgiveness, University of Maryland, Baltimore) whom believe that forgiveness should be a rational decision instead of an emotional decision, and that the emotions are the ones that follow the decisions taken.
- Capt. Cindy Gass of Knoxville Police Department.
- Azim Khamisa, a Sufi Muslim whom express that when people do not forgive they are the one that continue suffering and that forgiven allow to heal relationships, and that it also allow to not focus ourselves or our situation in order that we can go beyond it, understand the circumstances and solve the systemic issues that originated affording the healing of the affected parts.
- Ples Felix, a retired Green Beret baptist that was raised Tony Hicks during his childhood and took care of him after the incident in which Tariq Khamisa was killed.

== Budget and founding ==
The documentary was founded by Fetzer institute (part of Love and Forgiveness campaign) and the John Templeton Foundation.

== Synopsis ==
The documentary explores the reason, effects and benefits of forgiveness. Begins with comments on the fight between Protestant and catholic members and 1980 Good Friday Agreement, the introduction of forgiveness curriculum in primary schools that includes mercy, and to seek and give forgiveness. It explains how Amish societies do not teach forgiveness explicitly in the families, but it is teach in their way of living.

It presents diverse circumstances in which crime and forgiveness are present, among them the following:

- New Lodge Six shooting where the author of the massacre is not known.
- West Nickel Mines School shooting where the Amish forgave the family of the assassin since it is part of their tradition and culture.
- The crimes during The Holocaust, where a person cannot forgive in the name of millions of victims that were also murdered or damaged.
- September 11 attacks, and comments by relatives of person killed during the event, and how the remains of the bodies and the building debris were deposited in the Fresh Kills Landfill.

It shows when Elie Wiesel asked the President of Germany to ask Jewish people for forgiveness and how 2 weeks later the president of Germany went to Israel and asked forgiveness for the crimes committed by the Third Reich. explains the physiology of revenge, and how the pleasure pathways fare up when a person plans how to make an enemy pay their offense as a craving for revenge, being this the reward or motivation for paying back an offense.

It also shows when the relatives of victim of crimes deposited in the Garden of Forgiveness the rest of their beloved ones in a space surrounded by a Mosque, a Synagogue and a Christian church and not in a Landfill.

Capt. Cindy Gass described the scene encountered on January 1, 1996, during the investigation of the burglary they found the body of Frances Worthington (Everett Worthington's mother) after the criminal(s) beat her, struck with a Crowbar and killed her during the sacking of her house. Everett Worthington explains how the play of both roles, the offended and the offender could help people to understand and to forgive.

Thích Nhất Hạnh founder of the School of Youth for Social Services in the 1950 to provide schools and clinics in rural areas, this work changed with the Vietnam War in 1955, the army went to the school and killed the students at a time when Thích Nhất Hạnh was not present, after it he promoted peace and founded the Plum Village in France.

Tony Hicks was raised by his grandfather, at the age of 11 he joined a gang, and in an evening of 1995, when he was 14 year old, visited three of his friends, whom gave him drugs and alcohol, he was asked to kill and shoot a person as a part of a gang initiation, they invited him to a robbery and gave him a 9 mm handgun, an 18 year old who commanded him and two 14 years old boys, his friends ordered pizza, and when driver, Tariq Khamisa delivered the pizza, Tony shoot and killed him. Ples Felix (Tony's grandfather) and Azim Khamisa (Tariq Khamisa's father) created a foundation to prevent the fights and killings between children with three mandates, to save children lives, to empower the right choices, and to teach the principles of non violence, empathy, compassion and forgiveness, teaching them tools that they can during their life: learn to meditate, to be peaceful, to be centered, and learn to interact with other children in a kind way. Azim Khamisa believes that punishment does not fix society, but instead prevent society to find and solve the causes of crimes and violence.

== See also ==
- Thích Nhất Hạnh
- Walk with Me (2017 film)
- Forgiveness
- Forgiveness scale
