= Love Letter to the Earth =

2012 book by Paolo Diego Bubbio

- First edition
- Author: Thích Nhất Hạnh
- Language: English
- Subject: environmentalism
- Publisher: Parallax Press
- Publication date: 2012
- Media type: Print
- Pages: 144 pp.
- ISBN: 978-1937006389

Love Letter to the Earth is a 2012 book by Thích Nhất Hạnh, in which the author argues that we need to move beyond the concept of the environment as it leads people to experience themselves and Earth as two separate entities and to see the planet only in terms of what it can do for them.

== Reception ==
The book is described as "articulate and thoroughly reader friendly" and also "highly recommended" in Midwest Book Review. Peter Brightman, the CEO of International Entertainment Corporation, calles the book "a wonderful small book with a big message".
