= Joanna Macy =

American writer, scholar and activist (1929–2025)

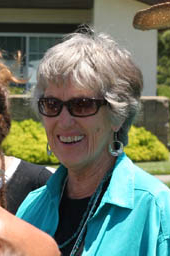
- Macy in 2006
- Born: Mary Joanne Rogers; May 2, 1929; Los Angeles, California, U.S.
- Died: July 19, 2025 (aged 96); Berkeley, California, U.S.
- Occupations: Author, Buddhist scholar, environmental activist
- Spouse: Francis Macy (m. 1953; died 2009)
- Relatives: Hartley Rogers Jr. (brother)

Mary Joanne Rogers Macy (May 2, 1929 – July 19, 2025), known as Joanna Macy, was an American environmental activist, author and scholar of Buddhism, general systems theory and deep ecology. She was married to Francis Underhill Macy, the activist and Russian scholar who founded the Center for Safe Energy.

== Life and career ==
Macy was born Mary Joanne Rogers in Los Angeles on May 2, 1929, and was brought up in New York City. Macy credits poet and activist Muriel Rukeyser with starting her on the path to becoming a poet and writer herself. When she was a high school student in New York City, she cut school and took the train from Long Island to Manhattan in order to attend a poetry reading by Rukeyser; the hall was already full to capacity when Joanna arrived, but Rukeyser invited her to come onto the stage and sit at her feet during the reading. In 1953, she married Francis Macy, who died in 2009; the couple had three children.

Macy graduated from Wellesley College in 1950 and received her Ph.D. in religious studies in 1978 from Syracuse University, Syracuse. Her doctoral work, under the mentorship of Ervin László, focused on convergences between causation in systems thinking and the Buddhist central doctrine of mutual causality or interdependent co-arising.

Macy was an international spokesperson for anti-nuclear causes, peace, justice, and environmentalism, most renowned for her book Coming Back to Life: Practices to Reconnect Our Lives, Our World and the Great Turning initiative, which deals with the transformation from, as she terms it, an industrial growth society to what she considers to be a more sustainable civilization. She created a theoretical framework for personal and social change, and a workshop methodology for its application. Her work addressed psychological and spiritual issues, Buddhist thought, and contemporary science.

In the early 1980s Macy and her family settled in the San Francisco Bay Area. She died in Berkeley, California, on July 19, 2025, at the age of 96, from complications following a fall.

== Key influences ==
Macy first encountered Buddhism in 1965 while working with Tibetan refugees in northern India, particularly the Ven. 8th Khamtrul Rinpoche, Sister Karma Khechog Palmo, Ven. Dugu Choegyal Rinpoche, and Tokden Antrim of the Tashi Jong community. Her spiritual practice was drawn from the Theravada tradition of Nyanaponika Thera and Rev. Sivali of Sri Lanka, Munindraji of West Bengal, and Dhiravamsa of Thailand.

Key formative influences to her teaching in the field of the connection to living systems theory were Ervin Laszlo who introduced her to systems theory through his writings (especially Introduction to Systems Philosophy and Systems, Structure and Experience), and who worked with her as advisor on her doctoral dissertation (later adapted as Mutual Causality) and on a project for the Club of Rome. Gregory Bateson, through his Steps to an Ecology of Mind and in a summer seminar, also shaped her thought, as did the writings of Ludwig von Bertalanffy, Arthur Koestler, and Hazel Henderson. She was influenced in the studies of biological systems by Tyrone Cashman, and economic systems by Kenneth Boulding. Donella Meadows provided insights on the planetary consequences of runaway systems, and Elisabet Sahtouris provided further information about self-organizing systems in evolutionary perspective.

== Work ==
Macy traveled giving lectures, workshops, and trainings internationally. Her work, originally called "Despair and Empowerment Work", was acknowledged as being part of the deep ecology tradition after she encountered the work of Arne Naess and John Seed, but as a result of disillusion with academic disputes in the field, she called it "the Work that Reconnects". She was affiliated with three graduate schools in the San Francisco Bay Area: as a research scholar at the Starr King School for the Ministry, as an adjunct professor at the University of Creation Spirituality, and as a member of the Council of Sages at the California Institute of Integral Studies.

== Writings ==
- Macy, Joanna (1983). Despair and Personal Power in the Nuclear Age. New Society Pub. ISBN 0-86571-031-7.
- Macy, Joanna (1985). Dharma and Development: Religion as resource in the Sarvodaya self help movement. Kumarian Press revised ed. ISBN 0-931816-53-X.
- Macy, Joanna; Seed, John; Fleming, Pat; Naess, Arne; Pugh, Dailan (1988). Thinking Like a Mountain: Toward a Council of All Beings. New Society Publishers. ISBN 0-86571-133-X.
- Macy, Joanna (1991). Mutual Causality in Buddhism and General Systems Theory: The Dharma of Natural System (Buddhist Studies Series). State University of New York Press. ISBN 0-7914-0637-7.
- Macy, Joanna (1991). World as Lover, World as Self. Parallax Press. ISBN 0-938077-27-9.
- Macy, Joanna; Barrows, Anita (1996). Rilke's Book of Hours: Love Poems to God: poems by Rainer Maria Rilke. Riverhead Books. ISBN 1-59448-156-3.
- Macy, Joanna; Young Brown, Molly (1998). Coming Back to Life : Practices to Reconnect Our Lives, Our World. New Society Publishers. ISBN 0-86571-391-X.
- Macy, Joanna (2001). Widening Circles : a memoir. New Catalyst Books. ISBN 978-1897408018.
- Macy, Joanna (2010). Pass It On: Five Stories That Can Change the World. Parallax Press. ISBN 9781888375831.
- Macy, Joanna; Johnstone, Chris (2012). Active Hope : how to face the mess we're in without going crazy. New World Library. ISBN 978-1-57731-972-6.
- Macy, Joanna; Brown, Molly (2014). Coming back to Life : the updated guide to the work that reconnects. New Society Publishers. ISBN 978-0-86571-775-6.
- Macy, Joanna (2020). A Wild Love for the World : Joanna Macy and the Work of Our Time. Shambhala Publications. ISBN 978-1-61180-795-0.

== See also ==
- David Korten, a collaborator with Macy on the Great Turning Initiative
