= Martin Doblmeier =

American documentary filmmaker

- Born: April 13, 1951 (age 75); Queens, New York, United States
- Education: Providence College, Boston University
- Occupation: Filmmaker
- Notable work: Bonhoffer, The Power of Forgiveness

Martin Doblmeier is an American documentary filmmaker, known for directing films for Public Television including Bonhoffer (2003) The Power of Forgiveness (2007), An American Conscience: The Reinhold Niebuhr Story (2017), and Backs Against The Wall: The Howard Thurman Story (2019). Doblmeier is the founder of Journey Films Inc, a film and television production company focused creating content on religion, faith and spirituality based in Alexandria, Virginia. In addition to numerous awards for film, Doblmeier has three honorary degrees.

== Early life and education ==
Martin Doblmeier was born on April 13, 1951, in Queens, New York to Joseph and Marilyn Doblmeier. The oldest son, he was followed by a brother, Robert and a sister, Debbie. Joseph Doblmeier was a convention manager and the family moved from New York City to Virginia and then to Rhode Island.

Doblmeier attended Bishop Hendricken High School in Warwick, Rhode Island from 1965–1969. Then from 1969–1973, he attended Providence College in Providence, Rhode Island majoring in Religious Studies. From 1978–1979 he attended Boston University's School of Public Communication (now College of Communication) graduating with a Master of Science degree in Broadcast Journalism.

== Early career ==
In 1976–1977, he was staff writer at the Providence Visitor (now the Rhode Island Catholic) covering area religious news and contributing articles to the Catholic News Service. In 1980, he created the nationally syndicated television series Real to Reel. It was one of the first major productions for the newly formed Catholic Communications Campaign, part of the United States Conference of Catholic Bishops. Real to Reel profiled leading religious figures, particularly in the Catholic Church. The first program featured Mother Teresa who had recently won the Nobel Peace Prize.

== Journey Films ==
In 1985, Doblmeier launched Journey Films, to further produce major documentary films for national broadcast.

=== Early films ===
The first film created was The Heart Has Its Reasons, a profile of Jean Vanier and his L'Arche communities for men and women with intellectual disabilities. The film won Doblmeier his first Gabriel Award and was broadcast on television stations and around the world. Following The Heart Has Its Reasons were two more film about communities of faith; Taize: That Little Springtime about the Taize Community in France and Grounds for Peace, about the Corrymeela Community in Northern Ireland. Both programs aired on Public Television.

Other films followed including Creativity: Touching the Divine, Final Blessing, Take Away This Anger and American Byzantine.

=== Bonhoeffer ===
Journey Films produced Bonhoeffer (2003), a feature-length documentary film on the German pastor and Nazi resister, Dietrich Bonhoeffer. Released into theaters and airing nationally on Public Broadcasting System, The Los Angeles Times wrote: "a heroic odyssey that is illuminated with admirable clarity in Martin Doblmeier's outstanding documentary”. The New York Times wrote: “Martin Doblmeier has assembled a touching narrative on the nature of faith.”

=== The Power of Forgiveness ===
The Power of Forgiveness (2007) is a film consisting of dramatic short stories profiling the Amish, Holocaust survivor and author Elie Wiesel, Buddhist monk Thich Nhat Hanh and others. Screening events were held nationwide including at the United Nations, the Washington National Cathedral and a special screening in honor of the tragedy at Virginia Tech. The film won top honors at the Sun Valley Film Festival. A companion book, written by former New York Times religion writer Kenneth Briggs was released with the film.

=== The Adventist Trilogy ===
A series of films on the Seventh-day Adventist Church followed, including The Adventists, The Adventists 2, and The BLUEPRINT: The Story of Adventist Education. Each aired nationally on American Public Television.

=== Chaplains ===
A two-hour long documentary film by Doblmeier, Chaplains showed individuals from Christian, Catholic, Buddhist, Muslim, and Jewish faith traditions serving in the military, prisons, police departments and other secular professions. The film also included profiles of United States House of Representatives chaplain Patrick Conroy, and United States Senate chaplain Barry Black.

=== An American Conscience: The Reinhold Niebuhr Story ===
An American Conscience: The Reinhold Niebuhr Story, explored the life of Reinhold Niebuhr, a leading American public theologian of the 20th century. Featured in the film are President Jimmy Carter, author David Brooks (commentator), civil rights leader Andrew Young, theologian Stanley Hauerwas and others. A companion book written by Jeremy Sabella was released with the film. The film was screened nationwide including screenings at Harvard Divinity School and Union Theological Seminary.

=== Backs Against The Wall: The Howard Thurman Story ===
In 2019 Journey Films released Backs Against the Wall: The Howard Thurman Story, a biographical documentary about African American theologian Howard Thurman, who helped inspire Martin Luther King, Jr. and other Civil Rights leaders. The film features interviews with Jesse Jackson, John Lewis and Vernon Jordan and was released nationally on American Public Television, winning a regional Emmy Award for "Best Documentary Film".

=== Revolution of the Heart: The Dorothy Day Story ===
In March 2020 Journey Films released Revolution of the Heart: The Dorothy Day Story, profiling Catholic writer and social justice advocate Dorothy Day. The film featured interviews with notable scholars, theologians and catholic activists including Martin Sheen, Cornel West, and Joan Chittister and won a 2021 Gabriel Award for Documentary from the Catholic Academy for Communication.

=== Spiritual Audacity: The Abraham Joshua Heschel Story ===
The final film in the biographical documentary series "Prophetic Voices", Spiritual Audacity: The Abraham Joshua Heschel Story was released in May 2021. The film profiles Rabbi Abraham Joshua Heschel and examines key aspects of his life including his relationship with Martin Luther King, Jr., his involvement in the Civil Rights Movement, and his role representing Jewish interests during the Roman Catholic Church's Second Vatican Council. It premiered on American Public Television for Jewish American Heritage Month.

=== Sabbath ===
A two-hour documentary for public television, Sabbath (2023) explores the concept of a weekly day of rest across Jewish, Christian, Muslim, and secular contexts, tracing it's historical origins and contemporary relevance. Through interview with scholars, clergy, and practitioners, the film examines Sabbath observance as a possible antidote to overwork, burnout and social disconnection.

== Filmography ==
- American Byzantine (2000)
- Bonhoeffer (2003)
- The Power of Forgiveness (2007)
- Albert Schweitzer: Call to Africa (2006)
- The Adventists (2006)
- The Adventists 2 (2010)
- The Blueprint: The Story of Adventist Education (2013)
- Chaplains (2016)
- An American conscience: The Reinhold Niebuhr Story (2017)
- Backs Against The Wall: The Howard Thurman Story (2019)
- Revolution of the Heart: The Dorothy Day Story (2020)
- Spiritual Audacity: The Abraham Joshua Heschel Story (2021)
- Sabbath (2023)
