= The Art of Communicating =

Zen buddhist guide to communication

- Author: Thích Nhất Hạnh
- Publication date: 2013

The Art of Communicating is a book written by Zen Master Thích Nhất Hạnh. The nine-chapter book was published in 2013 by HarperCollins Publishers LLC. According to Thích Nhất Hạnh, despite the integral role of technology, video conferencing, messaging and telephones in our lives, we still have difficulty communicating and understanding our inner sufferings. In this book, Thích Nhất Hạnh teaches how to communicate confidently and mindfully, first with ourselves and then with those around us.

== Synopsis ==
=== Essential Food ===
In this chapter, the role of food in human life is discussed, emphasizing that it is not limited to eating and drinking, and that what we see, hear, touch and smell is also human food. Therefore, we must pay attention to the fact that the types of food we consume contain compassion and kindness. Thích Nhất Hạnh wrote:

When we say something that nourishes us and uplifts the people around us, we are feeding love and compassion. When we speak and act in a way that causes tension and anger, we are nourishing violence and suffering.

=== Communicating with Yourself ===
In this chapter, the Buddhist master explains the importance of mindful communication we create with ourselves. According to Thích Nhất Hạnh in the world of modern technology, even if we are always online, texting and holding video conferences, a person feels lonely. When we realize that we are walking, sitting, or doing something mindfully, we begin to communicate with ourselves, and at the same time, we can create compassionate communication with other people by removing fear and anger from our souls.

We always have time for at least one in-breath and out-breath before we pick up the phone or before we press send on text or e-mail. If we do this, there is a much greater chance that we will be putting more compassionate communication out into the world.

=== The Keys to Communicating with Others ===
In the third chapter, the author writes that we can establish compassionate communication with other people when we are aware of our own breathing. At this time, we can see that there is a Buddha inside all other people and we can listen to them with deep desire. According to the author, when people are able to listen to each other deeply, they suffer less and understand each other.

"The foundation of love is understanding, and that means first of all understanding suffering. Each of us is hungry for understanding. If you really want to love someone and make him or her happy, you have to understand that person is suffering".

=== The Six Mantras of Loving Speech ===
In this chapter of the book, Thích Nhất Hạnh writes that feeling alone is just a perception and offers six mantras for compassionate communication, which is the key to loving speech and deep listening. They include "I am here for you", "I know you are there and I am happy", "I know you suffer, that is why I am here for you", "I suffer please help", "this is a happy moment" and "you are partly right".

=== When Difficulties Arise ===
In this part, the importance of breathing consciously and understanding the cause of anger in order to manage anger when difficulties arise is emphasized. According to him, suppressing anger can be dangerous. It will explode if it is ignored.

=== Mindful Communication at Work ===
In order to live a life of awareness and less stress in the workplace, Thích Nhất Hạnh emphasizes in this chapter the importance of creating a place where one can breathe for a few minutes. He writes that the phone call is also a call for people to be aware of what they are doing and to focus on their breath: "When you walk mindfully, enjoying every step you take, this encourages others to do the same, even if they don't know that you are practicing mindfulness."

=== Creating Community in the World ===
Advising the practice of awareness to create a conscious society, the author notes that in order to change the world, it is necessary to start with society. Systematic change is possible with collective energy: "See yourself in the community and the community in you. This is a process of transforming your way of seeing, and it will transform how, and how effectively, you communicate".

=== Our Communication Is Our Continuation ===
Thích Nhất Hạnh writes in Chapter 8 that our communication is what we give to the world and what we leave behind. We communicate when we speak, think and act. So communication is karma, and every communication bears our signature.

=== Practices for Compassionate Communication ===
In the last chapter, the author speaks about mindful breathing, noting that when working with a computer, we should remind ourselves to take a break at certain hours and breathe in and out. While drinking tea, we should enjoy it and listen to the child inside us: "When we are embracing the wounded child inside us, we are embracing all the wounded children of the past generations".

== See also ==
- Vipassanā
- Buddhist Meditation
- Mahayana
- Sanskrit
- S. N. Goenka
