= Azim Khamisa =

American writer (1959-)

- Born: 1959
- Occupations: Author, speaker
- Website: azimkhamisa.com

Azim Khamisa is a speaker, author, and advocate for restorative justice and youth services.

In 1995, fourteen-year-old gang member Tony Hicks shot and killed Khamisa's son Tariq during a botched robbery in San Diego, California. Believing that "[t]here were victims at both ends of the gun," Khamisa forgave his son's killer and founded the Tariq Khamisa Foundation (TKF) to address the social problems he believed were ultimately responsible for his son's death. TKF provides mentorship, teaches nonviolent conflict resolution, and sponsors extracurricular activities for school-aged children. Hicks, who was tried as an adult and served twenty-four years in prison for Tariq Khamisa's murder, joined the foundation's board of trustees following his release in 2019. Azim Khamisa is also co-founder of the Constant and Never Ending Improvement Association, a diversionary treatment program for adolescents within the National Youth Advocate Program.

Khamisa was born in Kenya and previously worked as an international investment banker. He is a naturalized US citizen and a Sufi Muslim. His first book, From Murder to Forgiveness, is about the death of his son. In 2010, Mithaq Kazimi produced a film about his life.

Bibliography

- Khamisa, Azim and Jillian Quinn (2009). The Secrets of the Bulletproof Spirit: How to Bounce Back from Life's Hardest Hits. Ballantine Books. ISBN 0-345-50603-0.
- Khamisa, Azim (2007). From Forgiveness to Fulfillment. ANK Publishing, Inc. ISBN 0-9717798-3-X.
- Khamisa, Azim (1998). Azim's Bardo - A Father's Journey from Murder to Forgiveness. Rising Star Press. ISBN 0-933670-02-8.
