= Everett Worthington =

American psychologist

- Born: Knoxville, Tennessee, U.S.
- Education: University of Tennessee; MIT School of Engineering; University of Missouri
- Scientific career
- Fields: Psychology
- Workplaces: Virginia Commonwealth University

Everett L. Worthington Jr. is a licensed clinical psychologist and Professor of Psychology at Virginia Commonwealth University (VCU). His research interests include forgiveness and other virtues, religion and spirituality in clinical practice, and the hope-focused approach to counseling couples. He has written over 30 books on topics including forgiveness of others, self-forgiveness, character strength, religion and psychology, and couples' therapy, and he has published over 350 scholarly articles and chapters. Worthington has been frequently cited as an expert on his topics of interest in the scientific literature and public media.

== Education and career ==
Born in Knoxville, Tennessee, Worthington attended the University of Tennessee-Knoxville and was awarded an undergraduate degree in nuclear engineering in 1968. He attended Massachusetts Institute of Technology on an Atomic Energy Commission Special Fellowship and received his SMNE in 1970. Worthington served as a naval officer on active duty from 1970 to 1974, teaching nuclear physics at the Naval Nuclear Power School at Mare Island Naval Shipyard. He then attended graduate school in psychology (counseling) from 1974 to 1978 at the University of Missouri in Columbia, Missouri, where he received his MA and PhD degrees. He has since served as faculty in the department of psychology at VCU, primarily affiliated with the APA-accredited counseling psychology program.

In addition, Worthington is a licensed clinical psychologist in Virginia. In the mid-1990s, he served the Commonwealth of Virginia as director of the Mental Health Planning Council. From 1998 through 2005, he was executive director and treasurer of A Campaign for Forgiveness Research, a non-profit corporation that raised $6.4 million to fund research about forgiveness. In 2005, he served as visiting professor at University of Cambridge and at the University of Hong Kong. He has won numerous awards in research, teaching, and service, and in 2009, he won VCU's top honor, the VCU Award for Excellence. Worthington is a fellow of the American Psychological Association.

== Research and clinical contributions ==
=== Forgiveness ===
Worthington began investigating forgiveness as a clinical method, noting that in his practice of couple therapy most couples had issues they could not seem to forgive and those often provided roadblocks to improvement in their relationship. Working with two of his graduate students, Michael McCullough and Steve Sandage, they developed the beginning of what would eventually become the REACH Forgiveness method for psychoeducational groups. The REACH method has been tested in over 22 randomized clinical trials by numerous investigators around the world and it is one of the two most studied methods to promote forgiveness. In addition, REACH Forgiveness has been used in psychotherapy, across cultures, with parents, in couple therapy and enrichment, in Christian communities, in classrooms, and in workbooks for at home use.

Worthington has made a number of theoretical contributions to understanding forgiveness. First, he has suggested that larger felt injustices—i.e., larger “injustice gaps”—are harder to forgive than smaller injustices. The size of the injustice gap is directly related to the difficulty forgiving. Offender apologies, restitution, and victim perceptions of the offender suffering, guilt, and remorse reduce the size of the injustice gap, making offenses easier to forgive. Second, he has observed that the victim can reduce the size of the injustice gap by many ways, such as successful revenge (although that obviously will usually increase hostilities), turning the matter over to God for divine justice or to relinquish it to God, forbearing, or accepting that “stuff happens” and moving on with life. The person could also reduce the injustice gap by forgiving. Third, there are two separate types of forgiveness. Decisional forgiveness occurs when a person decides to act without malice or to act in such a way to treat the offender as a valued person and forswear vengeance. Emotional forgiveness is hypothesized to be the emotional replacement of negative unforgiving emotions with positive other-oriented emotions (i.e., empathy, sympathy, compassion, or even love toward the offender). Substantial evidence supports this emotional replacement hypothesis. Fourth, emotional replacement is at the core of the REACH Forgiveness intervention, in addition to defining the two types of forgiveness and making a decision to forgive.

=== Religion and spirituality, especially in psychotherapy ===
In the mid-1980s, Worthington conducted research on and summarized existing research on religiously tailored psychotherapy. In a theoretical article, he put forth the concept that a client who valued religion tended to see the world through religious values. He argued that clients held a subjective zone of toleration of values by which they evaluated psychotherapists. If the psychotherapist's values were perceived to be outside of the client's zone of toleration, then poor response to psychotherapy or drop out was a likely outcome. Over the years, Worthington and his colleagues have shown through meta-analyses and qualitative reviews of research that religious and spiritual matching to a client's religious values—when the client is highly religious—improves outcome in psychotherapy. Nevertheless, in strictly matched treatments in which religious clients are randomly assigned to religious or secular treatment, differing only in the use (or not) of religious language and examples, religious and spiritual clients show little difference regardless of religious or secular psychotherapy. There is a suggestion that this is because clients who are religious employ their faith perspective regardless of whether the counselor introduces it specifically. In 2012, a joint task force of the Society of Clinical Psychology and the Division 29 (Psychotherapy) of the American Psychological Association evaluated a meta-analysis by Worthington and his colleagues to conclude that the evidence supporting religious or spiritual matching was demonstrably effective.

=== Hope-focused couple approach ===
Worthington formulated the hope-focused couple approach (HFCA) during the 1980s, and by 1989, the essence of it was in place. By 1999, he articulated a focus (i.e., hope), a strategy (i.e., promoting faith, work, and love), and major targets of intervention (i.e., communication and conflict resolution and intimacy, forgiveness, and reconciliation). He cataloged over 150 intervention techniques in his 1999 book, and Jennifer Ripley and he cataloged an additional 100 techniques in their 2014 book. The revised approach places more emphasis on attachment theory and uses forgiveness interventions as more prominent parts of couple therapy.
