= New Lodge Six shooting =

1973 mass shooting in Belfast

- Part of the Troubles
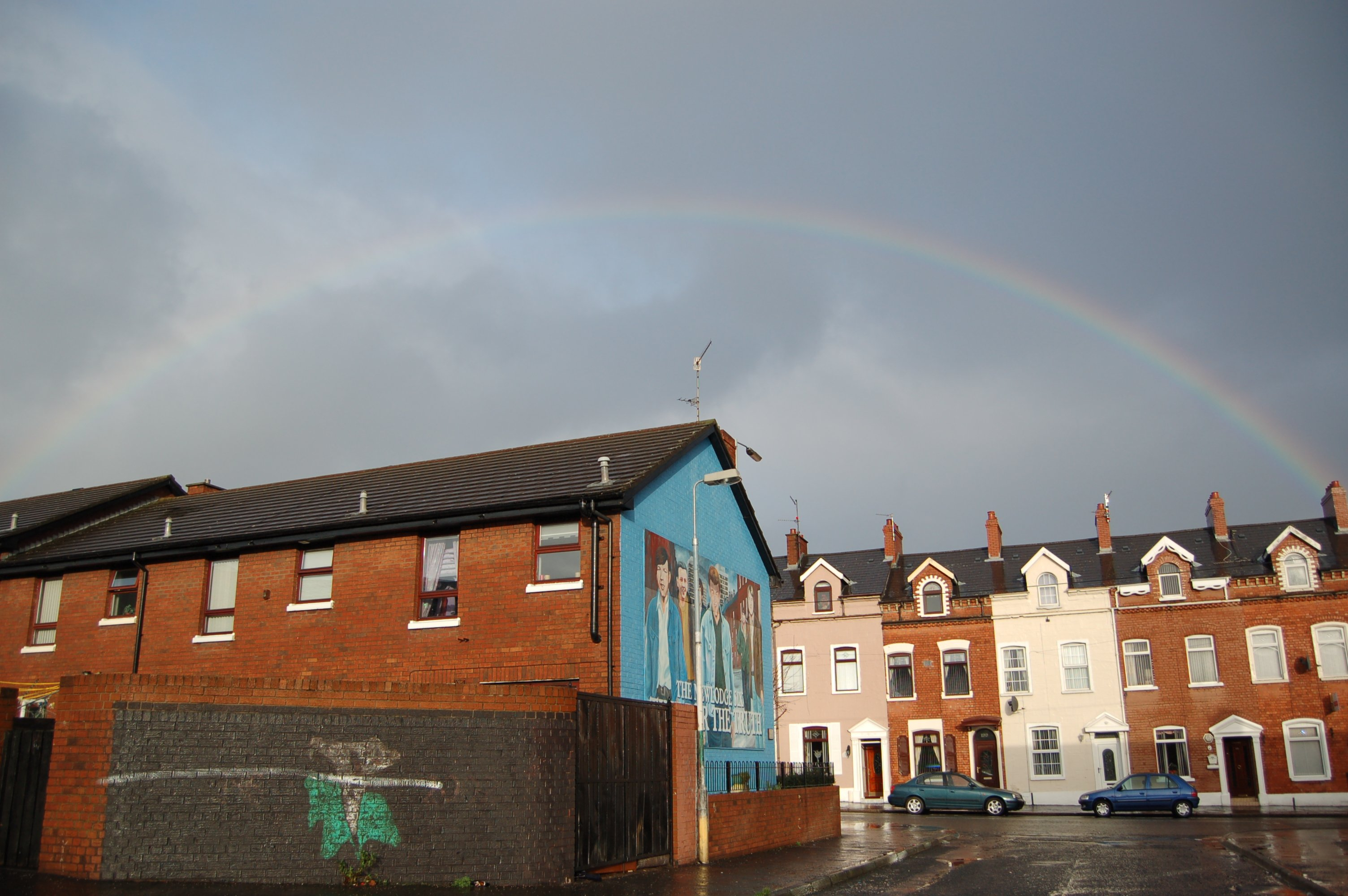
- A mural to the six men killed which reads "The New Lodge Six – Time for the Truth"
- Location: New Lodge, Belfast, Northern Ireland
- Date: 3-4 February 1973
- Attack type: Shooting, mass murder
- Weapon: Rifles
- Deaths: 6 (4 civilians and 2 Provisional IRA members)
- Injuries: 9
- Perpetrators: British Army, UDA, suspicion collusion

The New Lodge Six shooting took place in the late hours of 3 February and early hours of 4 February 1973. Six men, all of whom were Catholics, were shot and killed in the New Lodge area of north Belfast:

- four (one IRA member and three civilians) were shot dead at the junction at Edlingham Street by British Army snipers,
- the other two men, one IRA member and the other an Italian citizen and owner of a local café. were shot dead by the Ulster Defence Association (UDA).

Three other men were shot dead on 4 February by what was believed to be Loyalist paramilitaries, taking the total death toll to nine on 3-4 February. The six men killed in the New Lodge area became known as "The New Lodge Six".

There have been allegations over the years that collusion took place between the British security forces and paramilitaries at the time. Northern Ireland's Attorney General in 2018 urged an investigation into the deaths of the New Lodge Six. The Director of Public Prosecutions decided not to ask the PSNI to carry out an investigation; in response, relatives launched legal action in 2020.

== Background ==
The Troubles broke out in August 1969 with severe rioting in Belfast and the British army was called in to restore order. Shortly afterwards, the Provisional IRA began to wage a campaign of shooting and bombing against the British presence. Loyalist paramilitary groups waged a campaign of killings against the Nationalist community in Northern Ireland and also bombed targets in the Republic of Ireland. The conflict was a bloody and bitter one with all sides carrying out massacres of civilians.

The New Lodge area is less than a mile from the city centre. A stronghold of Irish republicanism, it has Loyalist areas close by and saw much violence during The Troubles. Most of the remaining Protestant population left under intimidation in the early 1970s, to be replaced by Catholics forced out of Loyalist areas of Belfast. Rioting and gun battles between the IRA's 3rd battalion and the British Army and loyalist paramilitaries were almost daily occurrences during the early 1970s and other periods of high political tension such as the 1981 Irish Hunger Strike. The area was vulnerable to attacks by Loyalist paramilitaries.

== Shootings ==
In the first four days of February 1973, fourteen people died and many more were injured in numerous gun attacks across the city. Tension was high in Belfast on Saturday 3 February. The UDA had paraded from many parts of the city to the Lada's Drive RUC station to demand the release of two of its members who had recently been interned. This was the first time Loyalists were threatened with internment and there were many protests and rioting by Loyalists in Belfast.

The first shooting in the New Lodge occurred at around 11:00 when members of the UDA shot dead IRA men James Sloan (19) and James McCann, while they stood outside Lynch's Bar, in a drive-by shooting. The car then went down the Antrim Road and fire was directed at a Chinese restaurant, injuring others.

Residents gathered on the streets after hearing the shooting and soon came under a hail of gunfire from several positions. British soldiers fired a number of rounds at a crowd of people from Duncairn Gardens down Edlingham Street and from the top of Templar and Alamein Flats. For the first time in Northern Ireland, the army was using their new 'nitesights'. Four more people, Tony Campbell (19), Ambrose Hardy (26), Brendan Maguire (33) and John Loughran (35), were shot dead by British snipers.

== Aftermath ==
The British Army released a statement after the shootings in which they claimed that between 23:45 and 03:00 there was a severe gun battle in the New Lodge area: in about 30 incidents, nearly 200 shots were fired at the security forces and fire was returned on most occasions; seven of the people shot were gunmen and six of them died. Eyewitnesses claimed that none of those shot was armed at the time. The sister of Ambrose Hardy claims he was waving a white petticoat when shot. Six years later Ambrose Hardy's brother John Hardy (43) was killed by UVF gunmen while he was having dinner with his family.
