= Parallax Press =

Non-profit book publisher

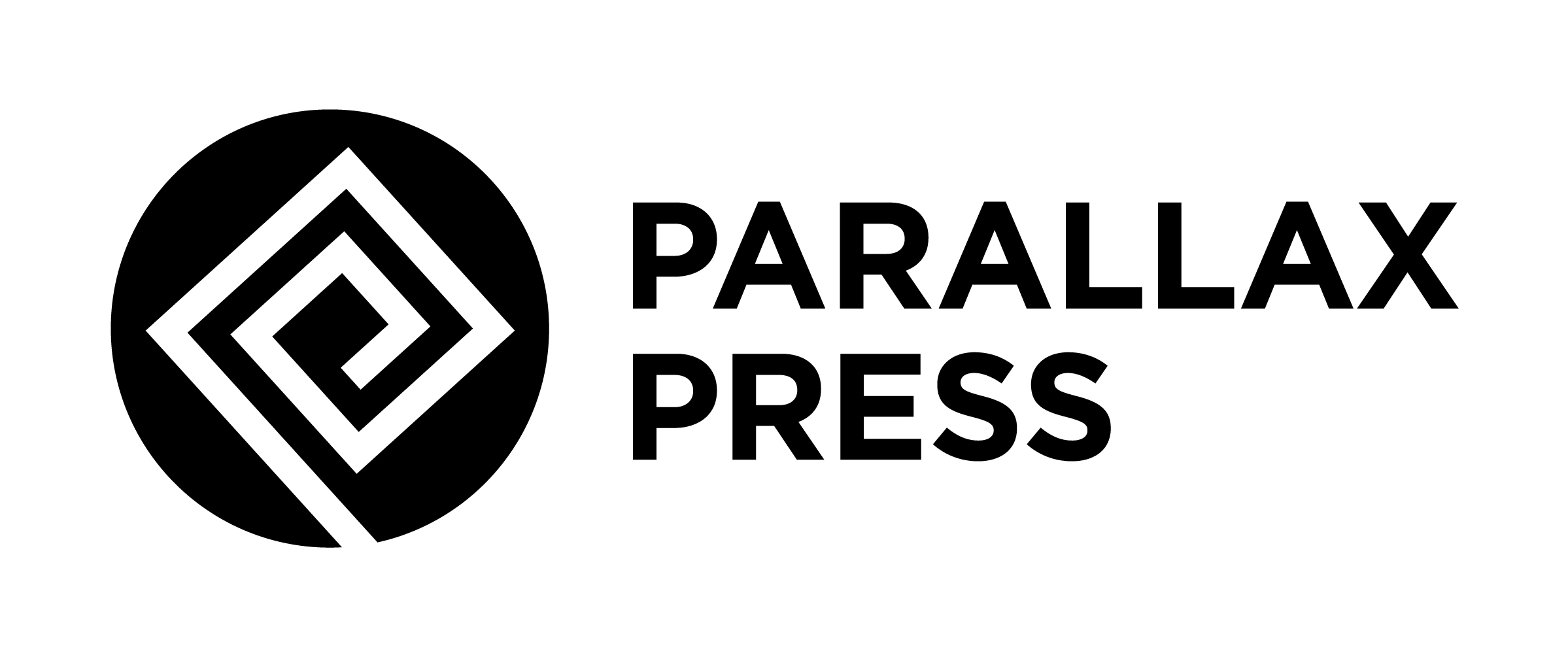
- Founded: 1986; 40 years ago
- Founders: Thích Nhất Hạnh and Arnie Kotler
- Country of origin: United States
- Headquarters location: Berkeley, California
- Nonfiction topics: Buddhism, education, mindfulness, peace, social justice, sustainability
- Imprints: Palm Leaves Press, Parallax Press, Plum Blossom Press
- Official website: www.parallax.org

Parallax Press is an American nonprofit book publisher founded by the Vietnamese Thiền Buddhist monk and peace activist Zen Master Thích Nhất Hạnh. It is part of the Plum Village Community of Engaged Buddhism.

It publishes authors writing about Buddhism, mindfulness, contemplative practice, personal and collective healing, activism for peace, protection of the Earth, and social justice.

== History ==
Parallax Press publishes more than a hundred books by Thich Nhat Hanh and is also the publishing home of authors writing on mindfulness in daily life; contemplative practice; personal and collective healing; and activism for peace, the protection of the Earth, and social justice. Authors include Nhat Hanh, Chân Không, the 14th Dalai Lama, Joanna Macy, Sister Dang Nghiem, Satish Kumar, Marc Andrus, Pablo d'Ors, and Alberto Blanco.

Since April 2016, Parallax Press books have been distributed by Penguin Random House Publisher Services.

== Imprints ==
Parallax Press's publishing program includes the following three imprints.

- Palm Leaves Press: Sutra commentaries and scholarly books on aspects of Buddhist history
- Parallax Press: Books on mindfulness in daily life
- Plum Blossom Books: Books for children of all ages
