= Center for Safe Energy =

The Center for Safe Energy is non-profit environmental group founded in 1991 by Francis Underhill Macy and Enid Schreibman.

Located in Berkeley, California, the Center has been organizing technical and cultural collaborations between Americans and citizens of the erstwhile Soviet Union. The Center has co-sponsored many energy conferences and seminars in Russia and Ukraine, has conducted training and grant programs in Kazakhstan and has organized study tours in the U.S. for environmental activists from those countries.

== Founders ==
Francis Macy and Enid Schreibman co-founded the Center in 1995. They trained hundreds of environmentalists in Russia, Ukraine, Georgia, and Kazakhstan to address the legacy of the arms race and the Chernobyl disaster. Initiating scores of professional delegations and exchanges between Americans and their counterparts in the former Soviet Union in the areas of psychology, environment, and citizen organizing since 1983, the Center for Safe Energy empowered the rise of non-governmental organizations – a strong contribution to the health of post-Soviet life.

Macy was the first director of Center for Citizen Initiatives. In 2005, he was awarded the Nuclear Free Future Lifetime Achievement Award. Macy, an experienced organizer, led professional exchanges to and from the former Soviet Union since 1986.

== Fieldwork ==
CSE organizes two-way exchanges with partners on energy efficiency and climate change. It alternates between hosting experts from the former Soviet Union in the US to meet with their counterparts; and sending US experts to the former Soviet Union to exchange experience on safe energy strategies.

The CSE also collaborates with partner NGO EcoForum Kazakhstan, to arrange conferences and exchanges on energy, climate change, and cities. They promote programs, policies, and projects to reduce emissions of carbon dioxide and mitigate climate change by increasing energy efficiency and promoting the replacement of fossil fuels by renewable energy.

For 10 years, the Center for Safe Energy hosted delegations of Russian grassroots environmentalist leaders through the Open World Program of the Open World Leadership Center, an independent legislative branch entity headquartered at the Library of Congress in Washington, D.C.

== Earth Island Institute Partnership ==
Center for Safe Energy is fiscally sponsored by the Earth Island Institute, an organization that fiscally sponsors a number of fledgling activist groups which it refers to as "Incubator Projects." Many have gone on to become independent 501(c)(3) organizations while others remain under the umbrella of the institute.
