= Forgiveness scale =

Psychological test

A forgiveness scale is a psychological test that attempts to measure a person's willingness to forgive. A true definition of forgiveness is debated by many researchers, yet Hargrave suggests that forgiveness refers to releasing resentment towards an offender.

Forgiveness is a complex phenomenon which involves cognitive, affective, behavioural, motivational, decisional and interpersonal elements. Forgiveness is thought to be central to human functioning and important in restoring interpersonal relationships. It is an effective intervention to problems caused by anger, depression, drug abuse, guilt and moral development.

Due to the different conceptualisations of forgiveness, different scales have been developed to measure the ability in different ways. Examples of forgiveness scales include the Forgiveness scale of the Interpersonal Relationship Resolution Scale; the Marital Offence-Specific Forgiveness Scale; the Workplace Forgiveness Scale; and the Tendency to Forgive scale.

Forgiveness can also be measured via methods which are not empirical scales. These may come in the form of biological measures; such as chemical, central and peripheral physiological measures, as well as behavioural measures; and measures of self forgiveness.

Studies have found that compared to participants without past suicide attempts, those with past suicide attempts scored on the Forgiveness Scale as being significantly less believing of forgiveness by others, were less likely to forgive themselves, and to a lesser degree, were less forgiving of others.

== The Development of Forgiveness Scales ==
=== Hargrave's Forgiveness Framework ===
This framework builds the basis for some forgiveness scales by identifying that destructive entitlement results in family pain and hurt. Forgiveness is able to reduce this destructive entitlement and improve family relationships.

Hargrave identified that forgiveness can be categorised as exonerating or forgiving. Exonerating focuses on understanding why the pain was perpetrated whereas forgiving focuses on rebuilding love and trust in the relationship. Forgiving can also be achieved by giving the opportunity for compensation through an overt act of forgiving.

The development of the Interpersonal Relationship Resolution Scale (IRRS) from this framework uses the victim's perceptions of their interactions with others. This is because the IRRS is a self-report measure.

=== Interpersonal Relationship Resolution Scale (IRRS) ===
A five stage procedure was used to develop the IRRS.

Stage 1: This initial stage involved the development of definitions for forgiveness and the manifestations of pain; these included forgiveness through insight, opportunity for compensation and the act of forgiving as well as a range of pain from shame to rage to chaos. These definitions were grouped to form the Forgiveness Scale and the Pain Scale respectively.

Stage 2: Then statements were formulated, from the definitions in stage 1, to create the items for the scale. 162 items were created for the preliminary IRRS represented in the form of 'yes/no' options from which the participant chose. The final IRRS consisted of a forgiveness scale of 44 items.

Stage 3: The third stage was used to test the preliminary IRRS. The scale's subjects, factor analysis and reliability were tested. These results showed that there was no correlation between the Forgiveness and Pain Scales, thus confirming that they tested different phenomena.

Stage 4: Concurrent validity of the IRRS was then tested. Both the Forgiveness Scale and the Pain Scale were found to have correlations to other scales which increased the concurrent validity of the IRRS.

Stage 5: The final stage looked into the predictive validity of the IRRS which was supported by the findings.

The IRRS was then acknowledged as a suitable scale for testing forgiveness through perceptual inter-personal interactions.

=== Tendency to Forgive Scale (TTF) ===
The TFF Scale is another empirical measure used to determine forgiveness and was developed by Ryan Brown in 2003. This measure differs from other forgiveness scales as it seeks to determine dispositional forgiveness over general attitudes towards forgiveness - such as the Attitudes towards Forgiveness Scale (ATF) - or scenario based measures - such as the Transgression Narrative Test of Forgiveness (TNTF).

The TFF Scale is a scale consisting of Likert-Scales which ask participants to respond with how they would usually respond when someone offends them. These items include statements such as "I tend to get over things quickly when someone hurts my feelings."

=== Self-Forgiveness Dual-Process Scale ===
Forgiveness is usually thought of in the concept of forgiving others for their wrongdoing, however it is also possible to experience self-forgiveness. Self-forgiveness is where a person becomes able to forgive themselves for any negative things they have said or done and experience moral repair. Therefore, the Self-Forgiveness Dual-Process Scale was created to measure it.

This scale was developed to test subject's self-forgiveness through positive value reorientation involving a cognitive shift to accepting responsibility for one's perceived offence, as well as the restoration of the self-esteem of the individual.

By recognising and measuring the mechanisms of self-forgiveness, regular functioning can be restored and thus improve the psychological well-being of individuals. Therefore the development of scales and understanding of self-forgiveness can not only aid research empirically but also the clinical applications of self-forgiveness and interpersonal functioning.

== Usefulness of Forgiveness Scales ==
The IRRS and TFF scales have both been acknowledged as highly valid through concurrent and discriminant validity tests respectively. This ensures that the scales are measuring what they intended to in terms of forgiveness. Thus, meaning that further academic research can utilise these measures when determining the forgiveness levels of their subjects.

The IRRS has been found to be a reliable and valid instrument for its purpose. This scale can be used to determine participant's forgiveness and the pain which they have perceptually experienced. As forgiveness is such a complex concept, this attempt to measure it using psychological methodology is very useful to researchers but should not be thought of as an exhaustive measure of forgiveness.

Research has shown that individual differences in one's willingness and ability to forgive are apparent. Therefore dispositional tests such as the TFF can be beneficial in improving the ability to predict forgiveness in conflicts and give insight into the interpersonal differences in forgiveness tendencies.

The psychometric properties and validity of the Self-Forgiveness Scale were statistically supported and therefore also increase the usefulness of the scale in further research.

However; the majority of recognised forgiveness scales are self-report scales. This may contribute to the limitation of the validity of some measures as subjects responding to the scales may act under certain biases, examples may include social desirability bias. Yet there is still evidence to show that these scales earned high reliability scores using Cronbach's Alpha and thus are still useful in psychological research.

It may therefore be suggested that in order to determine the most accurate and reliable measure of forgiveness, triangulation is needed. This involves combining measures from different approaches of measuring forgiveness; such as self-report scales, indirect measures and observational strategies in order to produce adequate and thorough assessments of the concept at hand. This avoids the assumption that a single forgiveness scale is fully exhaustive of the concept and helps to preserve forgiveness' holistic nature. Thus addressing both ultimate and proximate measures of human forgiveness.
