= Jōdo Shinshū =

School of Pure Land Buddhism; most widely practiced branch of Buddhism in Japan

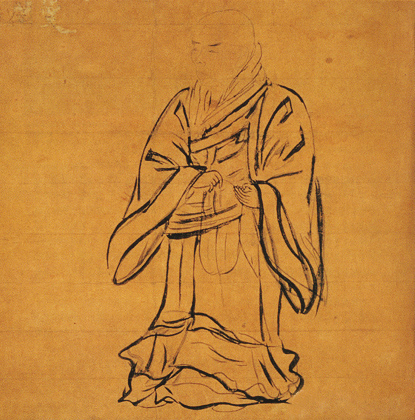
A portrait of the founder Shinran, located at Nishi Honganji temple in Kyoto. This painting has been designated a National Treasure of Japan.

Jōdo Shinshū (浄土真宗, "The True Essence of the Pure Land Teaching"), also known as Shin Buddhism or True Pure Land Buddhism, is a Japanese tradition of Pure Land Buddhism founded by Shinran (1173–1263). Other names for this tradition include Monto-shū (School of the followers) and Ikkō-shū (Single-minded school).

Shin Buddhism is the most widely practiced branch of Buddhism in Japan, and its membership is claimed to include 10 percent of all Japanese citizens. The school is based on the Pure Land teachings of Shinran, which are based on those of earlier Pure Land masters Hōnen, Shandao and Tanluan, all of whom emphasized the practice of nembutsu (the recitation of Amida Buddha's name) as the primary means to obtain post-mortem birth in the Pure Land of Sukhavati (and thus, Buddhahood).

Shinran taught that enlightenment cannot be realized through one's own self-power (jiriki), whether by moral cultivation, meditation, or ritual practice, but only through the other-power (tariki) of Amida Buddha's compassionate Vow. Therefore, in Shin Buddhism, the nembutsu is not a meritorious deed or practice that produces merit and liberation, but an expression of joyful gratitude for the assurance of rebirth in the Pure Land, which has already been granted by Amida's inconceivable wisdom and compassion. Doctrinally, Jōdo Shinshū is grounded in Shinran's magnum opus, the Kyōgyōshinshō (Teaching, Practice, Faith, and Realization), which presents a comprehensive exegesis of Pure Land thought based on Indian and Chinese Mahāyāna sources. Shinran's synthesis reframes the Pure Land path as the culmination of Mahāyāna Buddhism, emphasizing ideas like true faith (shinjin), other-power, the abandonment of self-power, the nembutsu of gratitude, and the all-embracing compassion of Amida Buddha's Original Vow.

After Shinran's death, his followers organized his teachings into traditions that eventually took institutional form through various temple lineages like the Honganji, which became major religious and social forces in medieval and early modern Japan. Figures like Kakunyo, Zonkaku and Rennyo further developed Shin Buddhist doctrine and practice through their teaching and scholarship, expanding on the foundations laid by Shinran. According to James Dobbins, "historically, the Shinshū derives its strength from the great number of ordinary people drawn to its simple doctrine of salvation through faith". Its simple and popular message, along with the tireless work of leaders like Shinran and Rennyo led Shin to become the largest Buddhist school in Japan by the sixteenth century.

In the modern era, the tradition also expanded to the West, with Japanese diaspora organizations like Buddhist Churches of America developing unique expressions of Shin Buddhism. Jōdo Shinshū continues today as a central expression of lay-oriented Japanese Buddhism, emphasizing humility, gratitude, and faith in Amida's boundless vow that carries all devotees to the Pure Land after death.

== History ==
=== Shinran ===
Shinran (1173–1263) lived during the late Heian to early Kamakura period (1185–1333), a time of turmoil for Japan when the Emperor was stripped of political power by the shōguns. Shinran's Hino family was a cadet branch of the Fujiwara that had lost its former status but remained known for scholarly service. Early bereavements, including the probable deaths of both parents, placed Shinran's upbringing in the care of his uncles. In 1181, amid the instability of the late Heian period, he entered monastic life at age nine under the Tendai prelate Jien and received the name Han'en. For the next two decades he lived as a modest hall-monk on Mount Hiei, engaged primarily in liturgy, chanting, and Pure Land–oriented practices associated with Genshin's lineage, though little else from this period can be historically verified.

Around 1201 Shinran, troubled by his inability to attain spiritual progress, undertook a retreat at the Rokkaku-dō. There, he reportedly experienced a revelatory vision of Prince Shōtoku directing him to the Pure Land master Hōnen (1133–1212). On meeting Hōnen that same year, Shinran adopted exclusive nembutsu practice and joined the growing community of Hōnen's followers, abandoning other Tendai disciplines. Shinran played an important role in copying and transmitting Pure Land texts, and Hōnen's entrusting of Shinran with a copy of the Senchakushū signified recognition of him as a disciple. At some point Shinran also married (at a date still debated by scholars) entering a new status as a cleric who neither fully retained nor fully relinquished monastic identity.

During this period, Hōnen taught exclusive nembutsu practice to many people in Kyoto and amassed a substantial following but also came under increasing criticism by the Buddhist establishment, who continued to criticize Hōnen even after they signed a formal pledge to behave with good conduct and to not slander other Buddhists. In 1207 a political scandal led to the suppression of Hōnen's movement. Two disciples were executed, while Hōnen and others, including Shinran, were defrocked and exiled. Shinran was sent to Echigo, where he and his wife Eshinni lived under difficult but mitigated conditions due to local family connections. Shinran and Eshinni had several children.

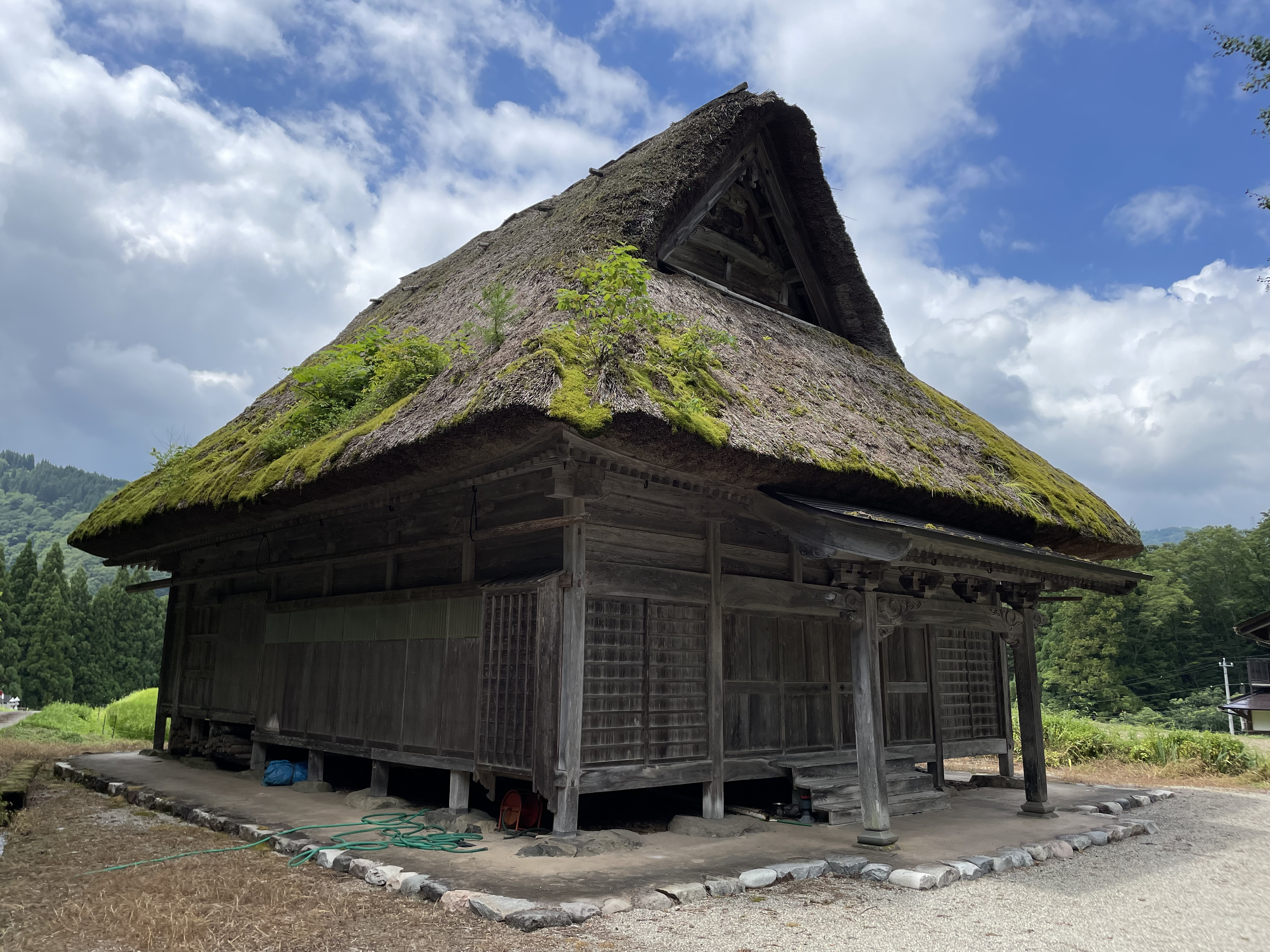
An old Shin dōjō in Toyama Prefecture

After their amnesty in 1211, Shinran remained in Echigo for two more years before moving to the Kantō region. During this transition he definitively abandoned complex practices after reflecting on their insufficiency compared to entrusting faith in Amida's vow. He adopted the names Shinran and Gutoku (Bald Fool), identifying himself as "neither monk nor layman". Over the following two decades he taught throughout Kantō, forming networks of lay communities (monto) that met in small dojos to recite the nembutsu and study his guidance. Through active correspondence and sustained teaching, he gathered numerous disciples across varied social strata.

In the 1230s Shinran returned to Kyōto, where he spent his later years writing, compiling, and transmitting Pure Land doctrine. His major work, the Kyōgyōshinshō (The True Teaching, Practice, Faith and Attainment), presented an extensive scriptural anthology with doctrinal commentary defending Hōnen's teaching and articulating Shinran's own understanding of faith. He also produced Japanese didactic hymns, commentaries, compilations of Hōnen's writings, and many letters addressing disciples' concerns. Though living simply and relying on support from Kantō followers, he remained intellectually active well into old age. His final years were marked by both literary productivity and personal turbulence, including the need to disown his son Zenran for disruptive conduct and false doctrinal claims. Through his teaching, writing, and community networks, Shinran laid the foundations for what later became Jōdo Shinshū.

Shinran's daughter, Kakushinni, came to Kyoto with Shinran, and cared for him in his final years. Shinran's wife Eshinni also wrote many letters which provide critical biographical information on Shinran's life. These letters are currently preserved in the Nishi Hongan temple in Kyoto. Shinran died at the age of 90 in 1263 (technically age 89 by Western reckoning).

=== After Shinran ===
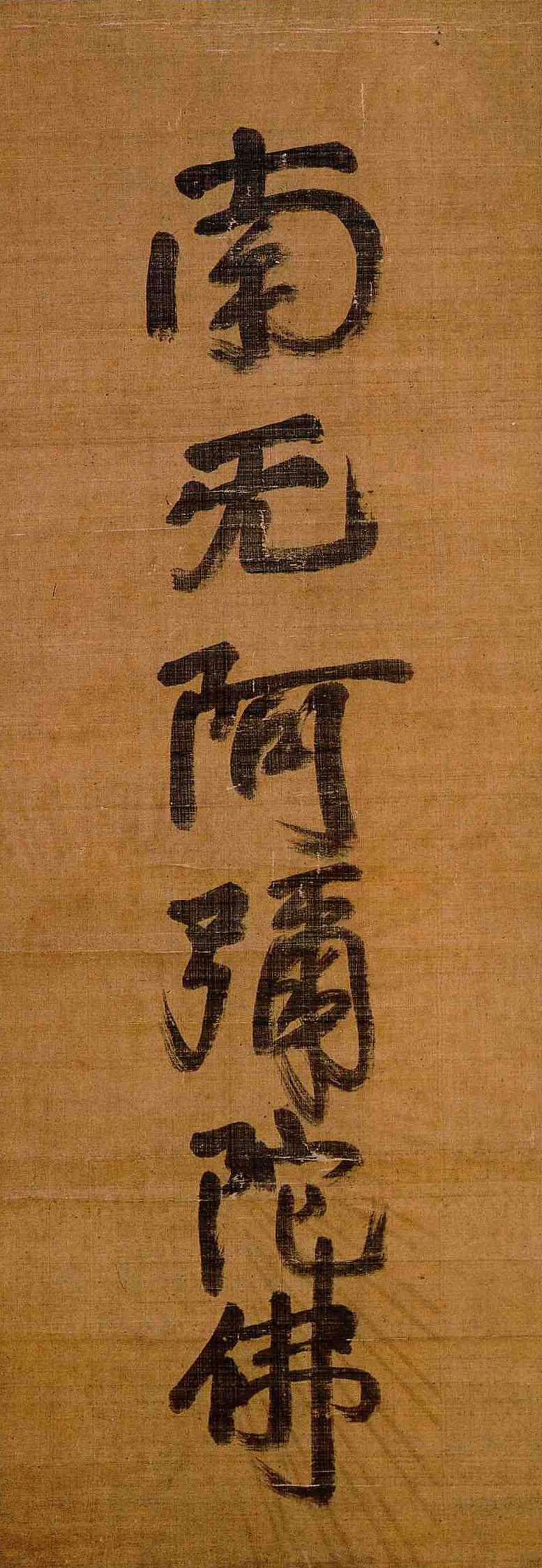
Nembutsu by Rennyo (Honganji). Calligraphy such as this was the most common honzon (main object of devotion) used in Shin groups.

From the thirteenth century to the fifteenth century, Shin Buddhism grew from a small movement into one of the largest and most influential schools in Japan. Its popularity among the lower classes in the countryside was a major reason for this rapid growth. In many rural villages, especially in semi-autonomous villages that were not tied to rural estates, Shin Buddhist congregations became a central part of village life. Pure Land missionaries traveled widely during this time spreading the Pure Land teaching, and Shin Buddhist temples were in a good position to absorb many of the new converts and to minister to the lower classes. During this period of sect formation, Shin Buddhists developed their school's doctrine, forms of worship, and systems of religious authority based around temples.

Shinran did not concern himself with establishing a temple or any organization in his lifetime, instead, his followers returned to their communities after learning from him, and created informal groups of lay Pure Land followers. These groups met in dōjōs, which were usually small private residences turned into meeting spaces. They met on the 25th of each month, recited the nembutsu and listened to sermons or sutras. They used vertical scrolls with the nembutsu as their main object of worship. Often the calligraphy on these scrolls would be from Shinran himself. Unlike temples, dōjōs were usually run collectively by all members rather than hierarchically by a single priest. Members would usually agree to follow certain rules of conduct which were posted for all to see. Dōjōs were supported by the private donations of all members, unlike established temples which relied on their estates and on elite support. Because much of Shin Buddhism was based on networks of private dōjōs, it did not suffer like other schools from the collapse of the provincial estate system during the 15th and 16th centuries.

Shinran kept in touch with the network of his followers through letters, many of which survive. After his death, his family members and key disciples continued to support and lead local communities through a loose network of groups and temples. Around eighty major disciples of Shinran are known from the sources. Some of the most important communities include those of Shimbutsu (1209–1258), of his son-in-law Kenchi (1226–1310) in Takada, the congregation founded by Shōshin (1187–1275) in Yokosone, and Shinkai's in Kashima.

A "fairly representative picture" of early Shin religious life can be found in the following passage from a Tendai polemical text:

At the present time lay men and women of the single-minded nembutsu (ikkō nembutsu) gather to sing the wasan hymns composed by the exile named Gutoku Zenshin [Shinran] and to chant the nembutsu at length in unison. In the "Larger Pure Land Sutra," where it describes the characteristics of the three classes [of sentient beings] born in Pure Land, there is the phrase, "The single-minded and exclusive Amida nembutsu" (ikkō sennen Muryōju Butsu). They take this to be the central message [of the sutra]. Pointing out the appearance of the key phrase "single-minded nembutsu," they refuse to recite the "Smaller Pure Land Sutra," nor will they perform [Pure Land] praise-singing at the six designated times of day (rokuji raisan). Rather, when men and women do their religious practices, they exert themselves, chanting the six character [formula of Amida's] name, and they sing in unison the wasan hymns of [Shinran]. They are not admonished against such impurities as meat eating, nor do they concern themselves with clerical mantle (kesa), robes, rosary, or full attire. Even if they put on a robe, they do not drape the clerical mantle across it, and they wear it over their silk narrow-sleeve gown of various colors. They do not set up monuments (sotoba) to offer up religious merit (tsuizen) to the dead, and they teach that one should not observe such things as prohibitions or taboos. This is folly.

Shinran's teachings spread in the context of Kamakura period Pure Land Buddhism, a movement that was seen as heretical by most of the orthodox schools of Japanese Buddhism at the time. The Pure Land movement was very internally diverse, and different groups within engaged in intense debates about key issues. These included the debate between reciting the nembutsu many times or just once, and the debate on whether wrong deeds and violation of precepts were made acceptable by one's recitation of the nembutsu (also known as licensed evil), a view which was deemed heretical by most of the major Pure Land institutions and temples at the time.

Shinran's teaching focused on faith (shinjin) and de-emphasized the keeping of clerical precepts or extensive recitation of the nembutsu. As such, Shin followers were often criticized as heretical, even by other Pure Land Buddhists. The Chinzei branch of Jōdo-shū for example, attacked Shin Buddhism as just another form of the single recitation (ichinengi) doctrine of Kōsai, which it associated with the licensed evil heresy. This was not an accurate critique since Shinran had explicitly rejected both views, but it was a damaging charge nevertheless. In response, Shin Buddhist leaders like Kakunyo and Zonkaku worked to defend and establish Jōdo Shinshū as a viable and orthodox tradition, critiquing the "licensed evil" view along with other heresies and developing a scholastically robust tradition.

=== The rise of the temple sects ===
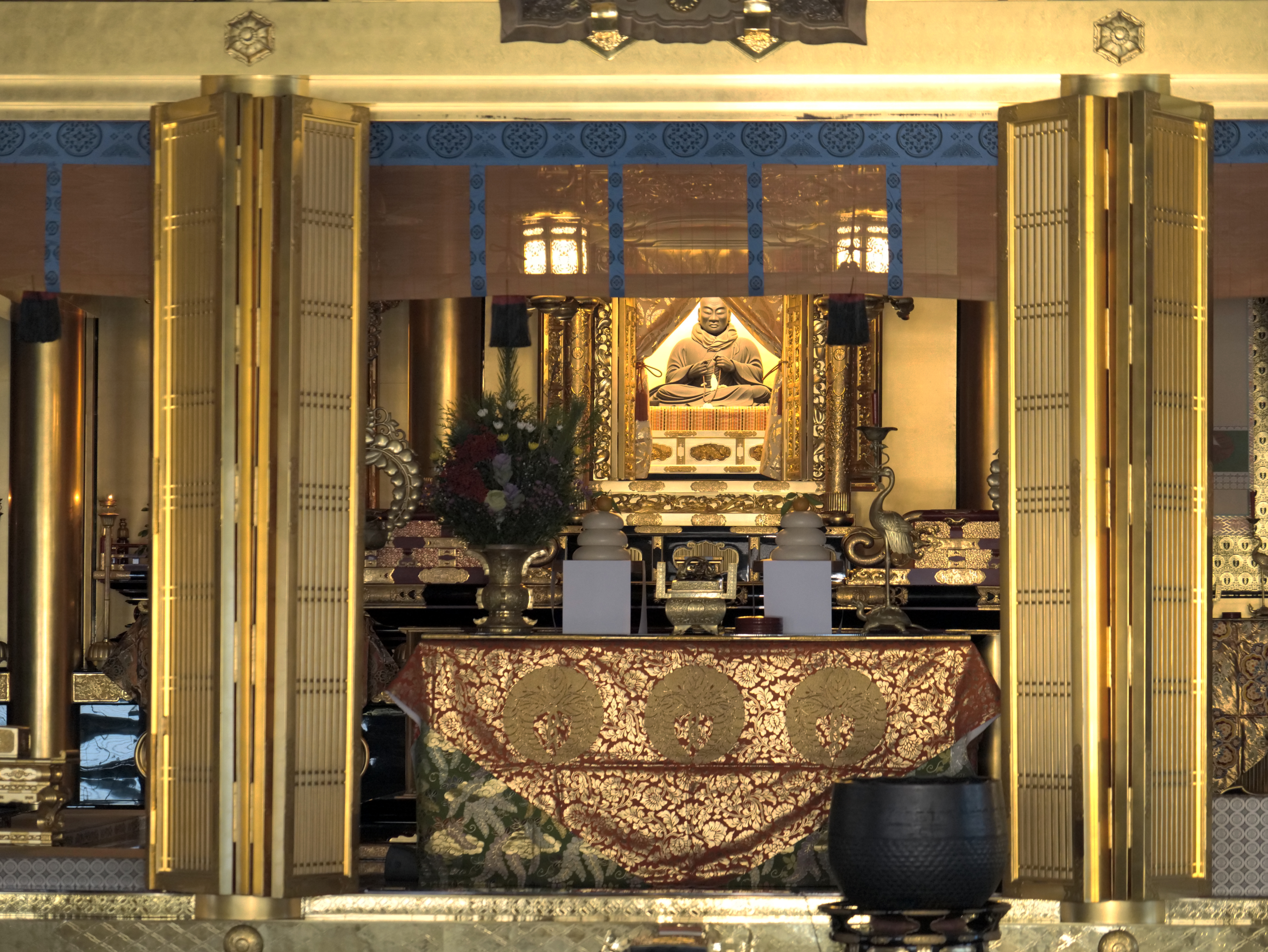
Main hall of Bukkō-ji (Shimogyō-ku, Kyoto) with a statue of Shinran. Hongan-ji and Bukkō-ji were both major Shin temples in the early period of Shin Buddhism.

Following Shinran's death, lay Shin monto or congregations spread through the Kantō plain and along the northeastern seaboard of Honshu. During this early period, Shinshu did not have a separate identity from the broader Pure Land movement. Shinran himself never said he was creating a separate school and most of his followers did not see themselves as a separate tradition than the general Jōdo movement of Hōnen. As such, many Shin monto continued to see Hōnen as the main founding figure.

The formation of the Shin Buddhist sectarian identity can be traced back to the efforts of Kakushinni's family, and especially to Kakunyo. Kakushinni officially placed the lands of Shinran's mausoleum under a community of local Shin followers on the agreement that her descendants would become its hereditary caretakers. A chapel with a statue of Shinran was constructed on the site of the mausoleum, and Shinran's followers gathered at the site every year to commemorate his death, a week long ritual that became known as Hōonkō. Thus, Shinran's direct descendants maintained themselves as caretakers of Shinran's gravesite and as Shin teachers. During the 14th century, the mausoleum grew to become a major temple and sub-sect of Jōdo Shinshū through the efforts of Kakunyo, Kakushinni's grandson. As the third monshu (caretaker) of Shinran's mausoleum, Kakunyo transformed the site into the influential Honganji ("Temple of the Original Vow"). He also compiled the first biography of Shinran, the Godenshō.

Kakunyo's career was marked by sustained efforts to consolidate the Honganji institution and to assert a unified lineage for Shin Buddhism centered on the veneration of Shinran and his mausoleum. Kakunyo turned to textual and genealogical strategies to legitimate Honganji authority, placing himself as the direct successor of Shinran in both teaching and blood lineage. His writings sought to anchor the center of the Pure Land community firmly at Honganji by presenting Kakunyo as Shinran's rightful doctrinal and institutional heir. Doctrinally, Kakunyo was a rigorous defender of Shinran's teaching that shinjin alone is the decisive cause of birth in the Pure Land, with the nembutsu functioning as its spontaneous expression. His position diverged sharply from the dominant Jōdo-shū view that emphasized the efficacy of nembutsu recitation itself. At the institutional level he established memorial rites, produced hagiographies, and created ritual structures designed to cultivate devotion to Shinran, now considered to be a manifestation of Amida Buddha. Through works like the Hōon kōshiki, he reframed nembutsu practice in terms of responding to the Buddha's benevolence, making hōon (gratitude) the central mode of Shin Buddhist piety and a key means of establishing a karmic connection with Amida embodied in the figure of Shinran.

Kakunyo's son, Zonkaku, was another influential scholar of the Honganji tradition. Zonkaku devoted himself to the expansion of Jōdo Shinshū's religious community and produced numerous scholarly works defending Shin teachings. Unlike his father Kakunyo however, Zonkaku did not see Shinshū as an independent sect, separate from the broader Jōdo movement. This view caused significant conflicts with his father.

After Kakunyo there were four heads of Honganji, Zennyo (1333–1389), Shakunyo (1350–1393), Gyōnyo (1376–1440), and Zonnyo (1396–1457). They were generally more diplomatic towards the other Shin sects than Kakunyo and made some further institutional changes. One of these was the installation of an image of Amida by Zennyo, which was moved to its own hall during the time of Zonnyo, making Honganji a true temple as well as a mausoleum to Shinran. During this period of growth, Honganji leaders also worked to compile Shinran's works. comment on them and distribute copies of these texts to regional congregations. Honganji thus came to be seen as a center of Shin scholarship and this attracted many provincial priests who came for religious instruction.

As the Honganji became an influential Shin institution, other major Shinshū temples also developed, like Bukkō-ji, Senju-ji, Kinshoku-ji in Ōmi Province, the Sanmonto temples in Echizen, and Zenpuku-ji. Most of these grew organically out of existing dōjōs who often consolidated their networks around the most influential temples. A common method these temples used to amass a following was sending itinerant teachers on preaching tours and the distribution of objects of worship (honzon), such as scrolls with nembutsu calligraphy, or illutrations of the Buddha or past masters, to lay congregations.

Bukkō-ji was particularly influential, growing larger and more popular than the Honganji sect in the 15th century. Having been founded as a temple and expanded by the efforts of Ryōgen (1295–1336) and Zonkaku, the Bukkō-ji sect was the major rival to Honganji. Its use of salvation registers which recorded all members and portrait lineages (ekeizu) differentiated it from Honganji and strengthened the power of Bukkō-ji dōjō priests and clergy over and above lay members. The priests received scrolls depicting their lineage going back to Shinran. According to Dobbins, "such practices placed the dojo leader on a pedestal before other believers and combined with his control of the salvation register, imbued him with special religious authority." The heads of Bukkō-ji in turn controlled the priests directly and could revoke the portrait lineage at any time, making the sect quite hierarchical. These practices were thus criticized as heretical by Honganji leaders like Kakunyo. Tensions and disagreements between Kakunyo and Zonkaku led to a break between Honganji and Bukkō-ji, who remained rivals. During the time of Rennyo, Bukkō-ji lost many members to Honganji when Kyōgō, in line to become head priest of Bukkō-ji, defected to Rennyo, taking many followers with him.

During this period of sect formation, Shin clergy continued to be ordained and educated in traditional Japanese institutions, like those of Tendai and the old Nara schools, though they also received instructions from their Shin elders. For example, both Kakunyo and Zonkaku studied on Mount Hiei and Kōfuku-ji before becoming major Shin leaders. Shin scholars like Kakunyo and Zonkaku also trained at Seizan school temples, mainly An'yōji. The role of the Anjin Ketsujō Shō on Shin Buddhism stems from this influence. This inter-sectarian education continued until Shin temples began to establish their own official education structure and ordination system. Though Shin priests eventually came to be ordained through official Shin temple systems, they did not take traditional Vinaya precepts, nor the bodhisattva precepts required in Tendai and other Japanese traditions. Nevertheless, they still underwent tonsure (tokudo), wore monastic robes and were expected to follow certain codes of conduct agreed upon by their communities.

In spite of its connections with several Tendai institutions like Shōren'in, the Shin tradition's relationship with Tendai was tumultuous, and Tendai leaders launched major military attacks against the main Shin temples in Kyoto, Honganji and Bukkō-ji, in 1338, 1352 and 1465. Tendai military monks also attacked Shin congregations in Ōmi Province well into the 15th century, seeing them as threats to their influence in the region. During this time, the Shin school was also engaged with religious competition and debate with the rising Nichiren sect.

=== 15th century ===
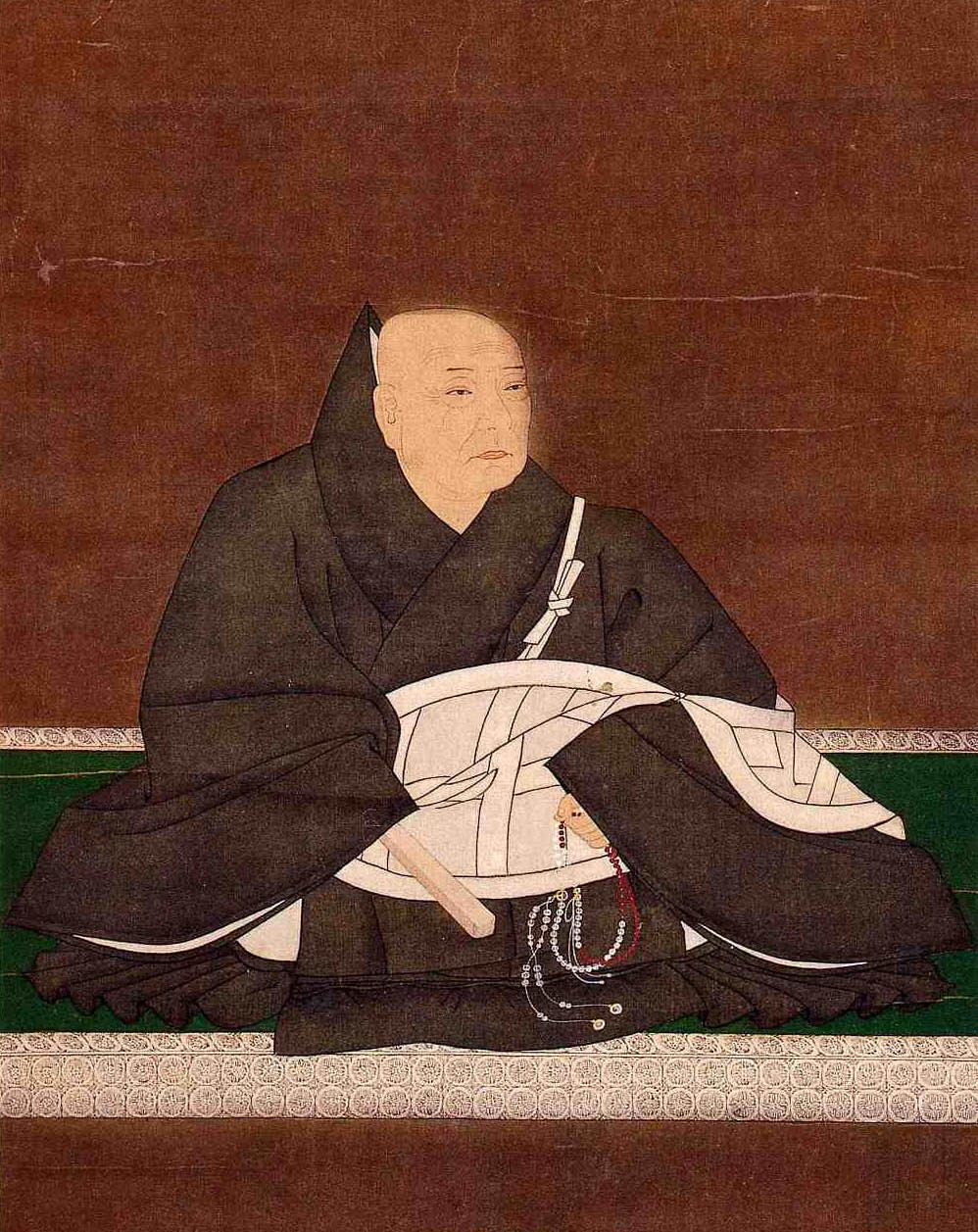
Rennyo

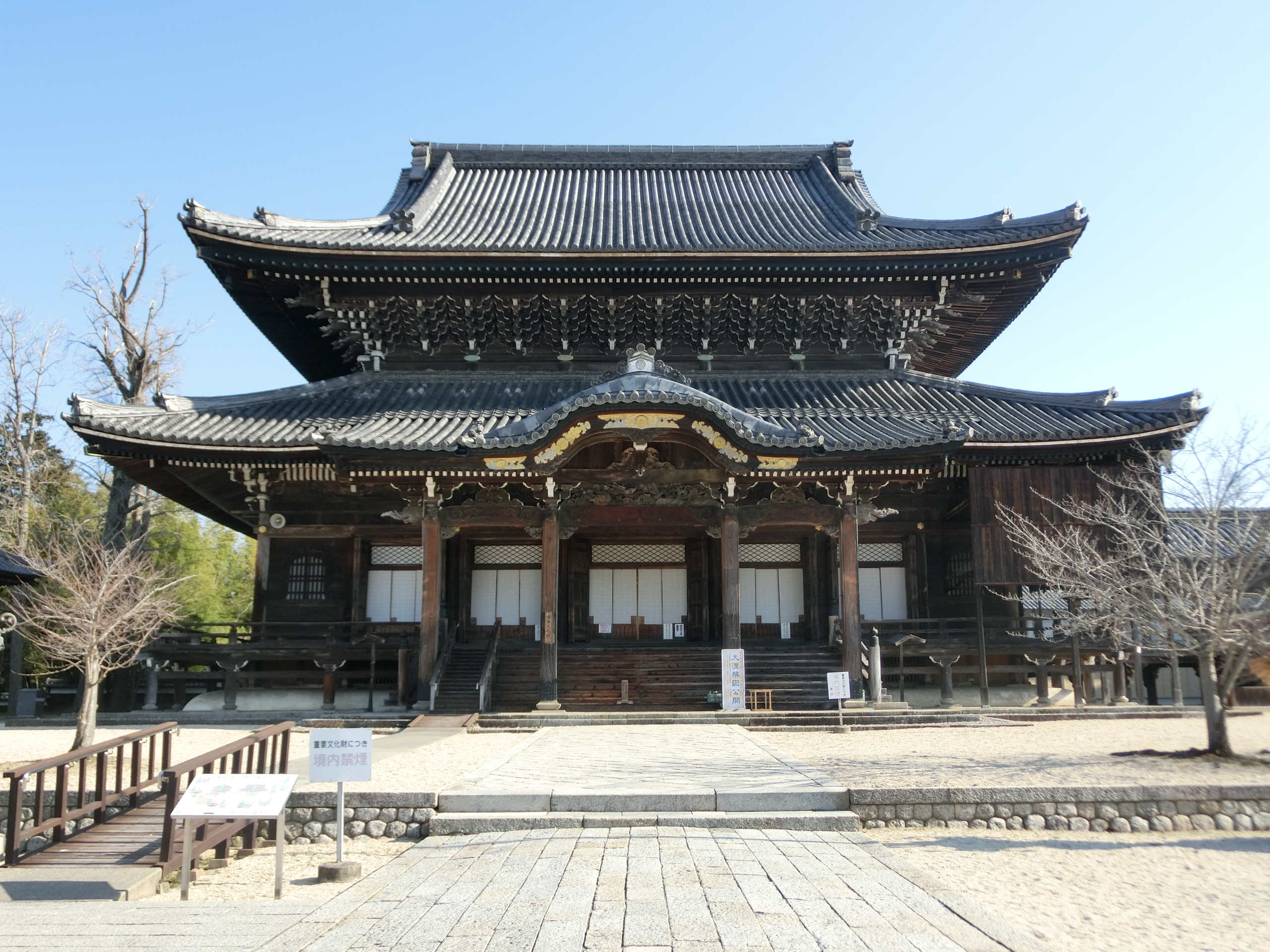
Buddha hall of Honzan-Senju-ji, in old Ise province (now Mie Prefecture)

The Hongan-ji sect saw a period of extensive growth and revival under the 8th head priest Rennyo (1415–1499). Despite living through the Ōnin War, which saw the beginning of the Warring States era, Rennyo was able to unite many Shin factions through his charisma and proselytizing, transforming the Hongan-ji from a regional institution into one of the most influential Buddhist organizations of medieval Japan. Rennyo expanded Shinshū's presence across multiple provinces through preaching tours, pastoral guidance, the distribution of texts and nembutsu scrolls and liturgical reforms. He articulated Shin thought in direct, accessible language in his widely circulated letters (Ofumi). He also led the building of a new Hongan-ji temple in Kyoto's Yamashina ward after the previous temple had been destroyed by Mount Hiei warrior monks. As a result of his efforts, many new members joined the Honganji at this time, some of whom were converts from other Pure Land sects, like the Shin Bukkō-ji and Kinshoku-ji sects.

Rennyo also reformed existing liturgy around Shinran's Shōshinge and hymns (wasans). He also worked to reform and formalize Shin practices, attempting to remove accretions from other sects that had been adopted by many of his new congregants, such as the practice of dancing nembutsu (popularized by Ippen) and the Mantra of Light. Through Rennyo's efforts, Shinshū grew to become the largest, most influential Buddhist sect in Japan. For this he is often called "The Restorer" (Chūkō no sō), as well as the Second Founder by the Hongan-ji sects.

In spite of Rennyo's influence during this time, other Jōdo Shinshū sects remained independent of the Honganji, and they did not recognize Rennyo's reforms and innovations. During the 15th century, Senju-ji remained a powerful sect (also called the Takada school), second only to Hongan-ji. The reform efforts of the Senju-ji head priest Shin'e (1434–1512) parallel those of Rennyo as restorer of his sect, though they remain smaller in scope. His preaching tours and organization efforts made Senju-ji a powerful force in Ise province, where a new temple was established.

While Shin'e and Rennyo were initially on good terms, they disagreed over their relationship to the Tendai school of Mount Hiei. The Tendai sect had long branded Shin followers around Ōmi Province as heretics, sending sōhei warrior bands against them and even attacking Shin temples, culminating in the destruction of Hongan-ji in 1465. In spite of this, Shin'e allied himself to Mt. Hiei in 1465, which recognized his sect as the true defender of Shinran's teachings against the other "heretical" Shin sects. This led to a break between Senju-ji and Rennyo's Hongan-ji.

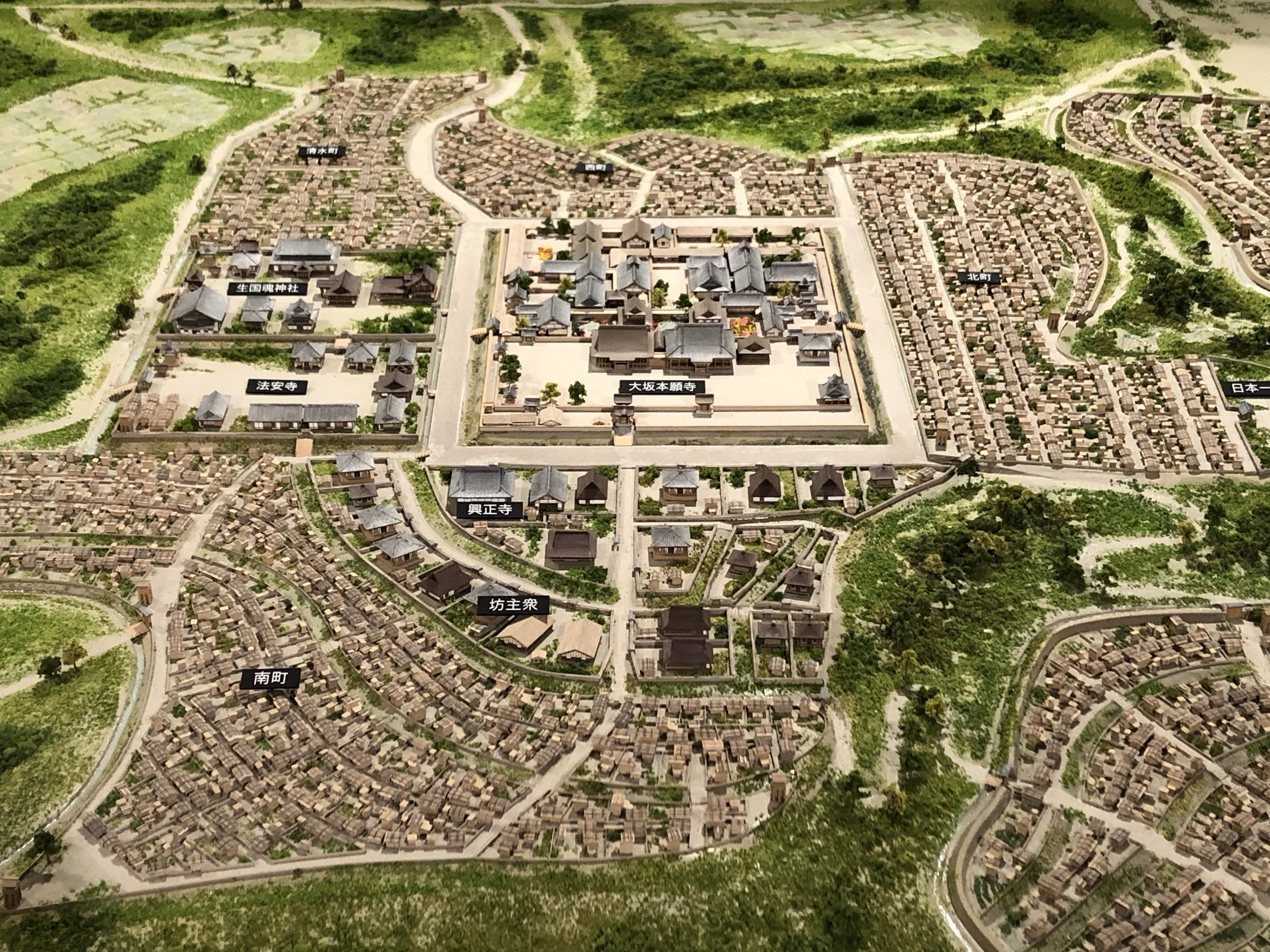
Model of the Ishiyama Hongan-ji. Osaka castle now stands on the site

During the Sengoku period (mid 15th century to late 16th c.), there were also other popular Shin movements outside of the major temple sects, including the Ikkō-shū and the martial Ikkō-ikki ("single-minded leagues"). The Ikkō-ikki were armed bands of Shin followers that formed throughout the Sengoku period, often for self-defense purposes or in opposition to local governors or daimyō. In some cases, these groups took over the local government. In the 15th‑century, Kaga region (Fukui Prefecture) Shin followers overthrew the local daimyō and governed the region for almost a century. Rennyo tried to negotiate and work with these various factions, while also attempting to mollify the government who feared them. At different times in the history of the Hongan-ji, such as during the time of Jitsunyo, and his grandson Shōnyo, Shin leaders worked with these various leagues and helped them organize.

Furthermore, the military power of the Ikkō-ikki also led to persecutions against Shin Buddhists in several regions like Satsuma and Kagoshima, whose leaders came to see Shin followers as radicals or heretical (igi 異義, literally "different meaning"). The persecution of Shin followers continued throughout the 16th century. Other Buddhist sects often joined in these attacks, especially Tendai and Nichiren sects. In 1532, the warlord Hosokawa Harumoto, an aide to the shogun, allied with the Nichiren sect and burned down the Hongan-ji. The Hongan-ji headquarters then relocated to the Ishiyama Hongan-ji (in modern day Osaka). These persecutions also led to the development of secret Shin groups, such as the kakure nenbutsu, kakushi nenbutsu and kayakabe. These communities would meet in secret places like mountain caves or private homes. Some of these groups also developed esoteric practices in which the true teacher (zenjishiki 善知識) was instrumental. Some also became influenced by other teachings like local Shinto mountain religions.

The Warring States period also saw the rise of lineages of secret Shin teachings (hiji bōmon, "secret dharma"). These teachings were based on direct master-disciple lineages and included unorthodox ideas like achieving Buddhahood in this life (sokushin jōbutsu) and seeing one's religious master as a manifestation of Amida that could grant liberation. While these kinds of lineages were common in secretive nembutsu communities, some of these lineages were also passed on in the established temple sects, such as in the Sanmonto temples, and later on also in the Takada Senju-ji sect.

=== 16th century ===
In the 16th century, the political power of Hongan-ji and the military activities of the Ikkō-ikki led to several conflicts between Shin Buddhists and the warlord Oda Nobunaga (1534–1582). These culminated in a ten-year war over the location of the Ishiyama Hongan-ji complex, which Nobunaga coveted because of its strategic value. The temple complex of Ishiyama and the city that had grown around it (Osaka) had grown powerful enough to make Nobunaga feel threatened by its influence. The site was eventually destroyed during the Siege of Ishiyama Hongan-ji (1576–1580) and replaced with Osaka castle.

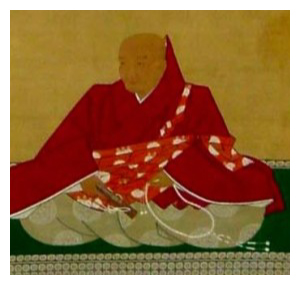
Junnyo

During the tumultuous transition from the Azuchi-Momoyama (1568–1600) to the Edo period, Junnyo (准如) emerged as the 12th head priest of the Hongan-ji, though his path to leadership was fraught with contention. Born in 1577 as the fourth son of the previous leader, Kennyo, Junnyo was not the initial successor; that role fell to his elder brother, Kyōnyo. However, in a dramatic political intervention in 1593, the ruling hegemon Toyotomi Hideyoshi (1537–1598) forced Kyōnyo to abdicate. Hideyoshi based his decision on a disputed document, allegedly from their father, designating Junnyo as the true heir. This decision, likely influenced by Kyōnyo's more militant history and a desire by Hideyoshi to control the powerful Buddhist institution, installed the young Junnyo as the leader of what would later become known as the Nishi (West) Honganji. His tenure thus began under the shadow of his brother's illegitimate removal, a schism that would define his entire leadership. Junnyo's early years as leader were dedicated to consolidating his fragile authority against his brother's lingering influence. Despite being forced into retirement, Kyōnyo did not fade into obscurity. He established a residence north of the main temple, the "Kita no Gosho", from which he continued to act as a rival religious leader. In response, Junnyo worked tirelessly to secure the loyalty of his retainers. This period was marked by intense internal division, with many families and followers torn between the two brothers.

The definitive split of the Hongan-ji into two separate institutions was formalized in 1602 by the new shogun, Tokugawa Ieyasu. In a strategic move often interpreted as an effort to weaken the Hongan-ji's collective power, Ieyasu granted Kyōnyo a large plot of land in Kyoto, leading to the establishment of the Higashi (East) Honganji temple. This act officially divided the Jōdo Shinshū community into the (West) Nishi Hongan-ji, led by Junnyo, and the (East) Higashi Hongan-ji, led by Kyōnyo. They have remained separate institutions to this day. While some historians view this as a deliberate "divide and rule" policy by Ieyasu, the Higashi Hongan-ji tradition maintains that Ieyasu was merely recognizing a pre-existing division, as the community had already functionally split into two opposing camps loyal to the respective brothers.

Following the formal division, Junnyo faced ongoing challenges in stabilizing his sect. Defections to the Higashi Honganji continued, even among those who had previously sworn oaths to him. Junnyo responded by focusing on internal development and external diplomacy. He oversaw the reconstruction of the Nishi Hongan-ji after a devastating fire and established several key branch temples (betsuin) across Japan to strengthen the sect's regional network. Recognizing the importance of political connections, he actively cultivated relationships with the Tokugawa shogunate and other powerful daimyō, making repeated visits to Edo to secure his sect's position in the new political order.

=== Edo period ===
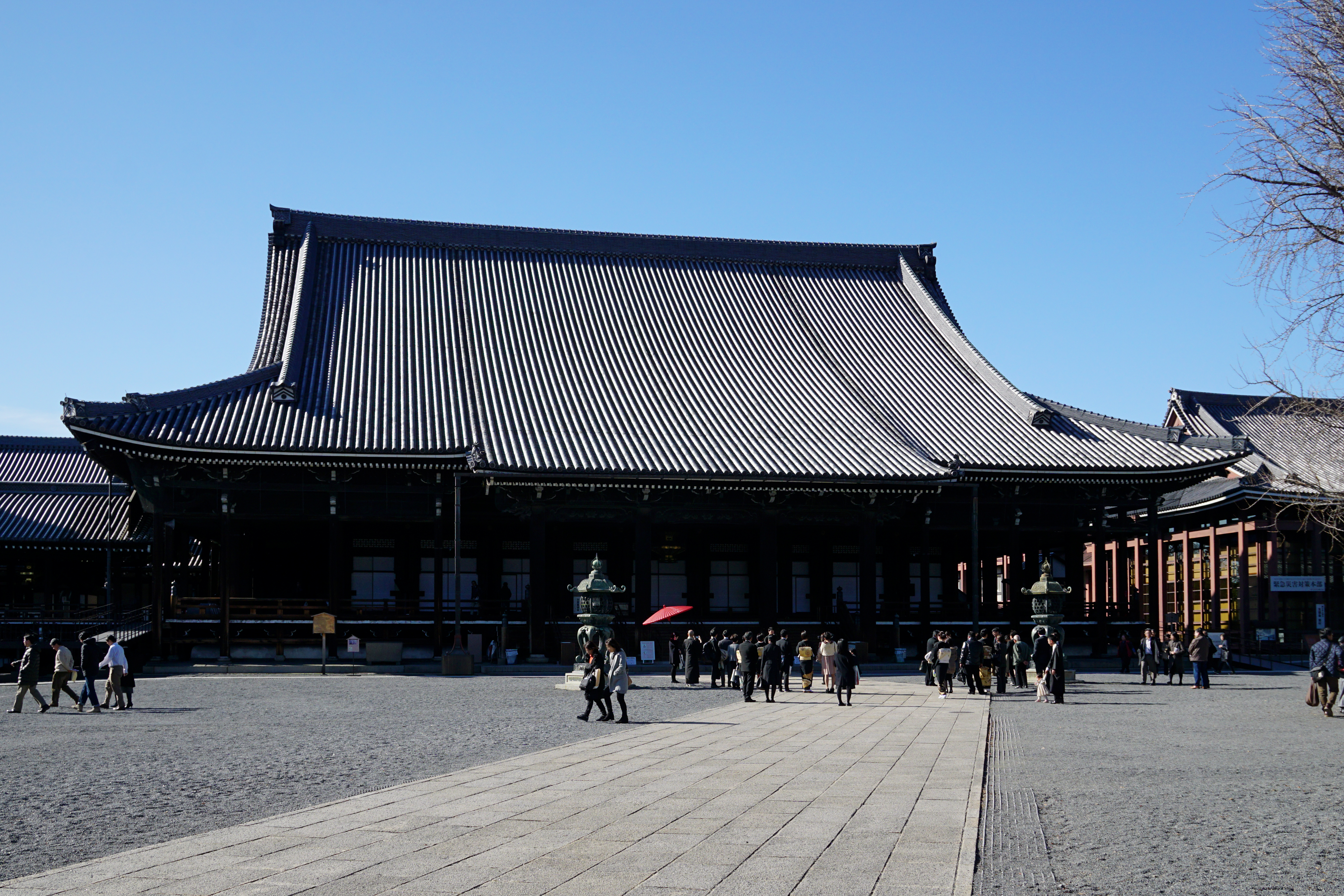
Nishi Hongan-ji's Amida hall, which dates to the Edo period

Following the unification of Japan during the Edo period (1600–1868), Jōdo Shinshū Buddhism adapted to the new danka system, which was made compulsory for all citizens by the Tokugawa shogunate in order to prevent the spread of Christianity in Japan. According to the new laws, all Japanese were required to belong to a temple. Their funerals had to be held at their temple and their burials held in the temple's cemetery. Temples kept records of all members, providing basic information about the residents. The danka system continues to exist today, although not as strictly as in the premodern period, causing much of Japanese Buddhism to also be labeled as "Funeral Buddhism", as funerary practices became a central function of Buddhist temples.

The Edo period saw the development of a sophisticated academic tradition by the Hongan-ji schools, leading to the founding of major universities like Dōhō University in Nagoya, Ryukoku University and Ōtani University in Kyoto, and Musashino University in Tokyo. The establishment of Jōdo Shinshū universities in the Edo period emerged from several institutional pressures which required a more systematized clerical education. As major Shinshū branches expanded their bureaucratic structures, they developed increasingly sophisticated scholastic curricula in order to regulate doctrine, manage extensive temple networks, and cultivate a clerical elite capable of interacting with the state and their parishioners. This environment encouraged the formation of dedicated training academies or "gakuryō" (seminaries) within the Shinshū establishment, which laid the groundwork for later universities connected to the major Shinshū headquarters in Kyoto. These academies became centers not only for sectarian doctrine but also for broader learning, engaging with Buddhist studies, language studies, history and philosophy. Over time, these scholastic centers developed into formal Western-style universities, with departments studying secular fields alongside Buddhist studies.

The Edo period also saw a series of doctrinal debates and conflicts within the Nishi Hongan-ji branch, mostly between Nishi clergy. These conflicts were not merely academic but involved institutional authority, political intervention, and the very definition of Shin orthodoxy. Two significant examples, the Jō'ō no Kyōgaku Ronsō (Conflict of the Jōō Era, 1653–1655) and the Meiwa Hōron (Debate of the Meiwa Era, 1764–1768), highlight the persistent tensions between central temple authority and dissenting scholars, and the role of the shogunate in adjudicating religious affairs. The Jōō no Gekishō was a disruptive early-Edo conflict originating from a charge of heresy within the Nishi Honganji's academic elite. The dispute began when the priest Gekkan accused Saigin, the head instructor of the Honganji's Gakuryo academy, of incorporating self-power (jiriki) and Zen-like elements into his teachings. The conflict escalated when Junshu, the head priest of Kōshō-ji and a relative of Gekkan, intervened with a doctrinal treatise supporting the accusations. This turned a scholarly disagreement into a high-level institutional crisis, with the Nishi Honganji abbot, Ryōnyo, authoring a formal refutation. Both parties appealed to the Tokugawa shogunate in Edo, who issued a severe verdict aimed at quelling the unrest and maintaining order. The shogunate ordered the physical destruction of the Nishi Honganji Gakuryo academy and sentenced both Junshu and Gekkan to exile in distant provinces. In the aftermath, Nishi Honganji was forced to rebuild its academy, now renamed Gakurin, in a rented Kyoto residence. The exiled priests were later pardoned, with Gekkan eventually transferring to the rival Higashi Honganji (Ōtani branch). The dispute also cemented a rift between Nishi Honganji and the Kōshō-ji subtemple, which had used the crisis to assert its independence.

Over a century later, another debate took place in Nishi: the Meiwa Hōron. This conflict centered on the precise iconographic form of the Shin main object of worship (honzon). The scholar-priest Chisen from Harima province challenged the orthodox Gakurin position established by the revered academic head Hōrin, who advocated for the standing Amida of the Contemplation Sutra as the true honzon. Chisen, in his treatise Jōdo Shinshū Honzon Gi, argued instead for the primacy of the seated Amida of the Larger Sutra of Immeasurable Life. The Gakurin academy swiftly moved to suppress Chisen's challenge, demanding his book be banned. Formal debates were staged in 1767, but they ended inconclusively. However, Gikyō and Chisen both died in 1768 and the dispute was ultimately resolved when the 17th Nishi abbot Hōnyo, issued ruling in favor of the Gakurin orthodoxy.

But the most serious Nishi Honganji internal conflict in the Edo period was the Sangōwakuran (1797–1806). The debate centered on differing interpretations of shinjin and Shin practice, primarily between the institution's official Academy faction and dissenting scholars from rural temples. The academy faction, led by Head Scholar Chidō (智洞 1736–1805), emphasized the necessity of the three devotional acts (bodily, verbal and mental) as an expression of true faith. Chidō and his followers criticized the theory that faith is essential for liberation (shingyō-kimyō-setsu) and defended the alternative theory that desire for birth in the Pure Land was essential (yokushō-kimyō-setsu). Their opponents (the "anti-academy faction", including scholars such as Daiei and Dōon, argued that this emphasis compromised Shinran's teaching of Absolute Other Power, asserting that true faith requires no self-directed effort and consists solely in reliance on Amida's compassion. The academy faction argued that "a fervent religious aspiration enacted in bodily, verbal and mental religious acts was not self-power practice but the mark of authentic entrusting to Amida's Primal Vow which itself arose through the working of Amida's compassion." At the core of this doctrinal dispute was how to interpret Rennyo's teaching of "tanomu". Chidō's faction interpreted the term to mean "to beg" the Buddha for liberation. His opponents instead read the term as "relying" on Amida Buddha.

The dispute evolved through three distinct phases: a period of intense scholarly debate, followed by a period of demonstrations and even violence, and finally, adjudication by the Tokugawa shogunate. After the Nishi administration proved unable to control the turmoil, the matter was brought before the Commissioner of Temples and Shrines. The ensuing trials, notably overseen by Commissioner Wakisaka Yasutada, were remarkably thorough and included detailed philosophical examination. The shogunate ultimately upheld the anti-academy interpretation as orthodox, a decision reinforced by the abbot of Nishi Honganji. The position of Chidō and the academy faction was condemned as heterodox, resulting in severe punishments for its leaders, including exile, imprisonment, and the posthumous exile of Chidō's ashes.

Scholarly perspectives on the incident vary significantly. The traditional view, upheld by many within the Nishi Honganji institution, regards the anti-Academy scholars as defenders of orthodoxy who corrected a deviation toward self-power. In contrast, some modern interpreters suggest the outcome was shaped more by the government's preference for social stability and conservative doctrine than by theological merit, arguing that it fostered a passive and institutionalized form of Shin Buddhism. A third, more neutral approach seeks to examine the specific doctrinal differences, such as the varied interpretations of key terms like tanomu (to beg vs. to rely on) in Rennyo's writings.

Apart from these internal controversies, Edo period Shin Buddhism also saw the "Sect Name Controversy" between Jōdo-shū and Shinshū (from 1774 to 1789). This conflict occurred when Jōdo-shū clerics pressed the Edo Shogunate to prohibit Shinran's lineage from using the name "Jōdo Shinshū". The Shogunate therefore officially referred to Shin as "Ikkō-shū" (the single-minded school). This had previously been the name of a separate Ikkō-shū sect which was now absorbed into the Ji-shū sect. Shinshū resisted and disputed this, but was forced to retain the name officially until the modern period.

=== Modern era ===
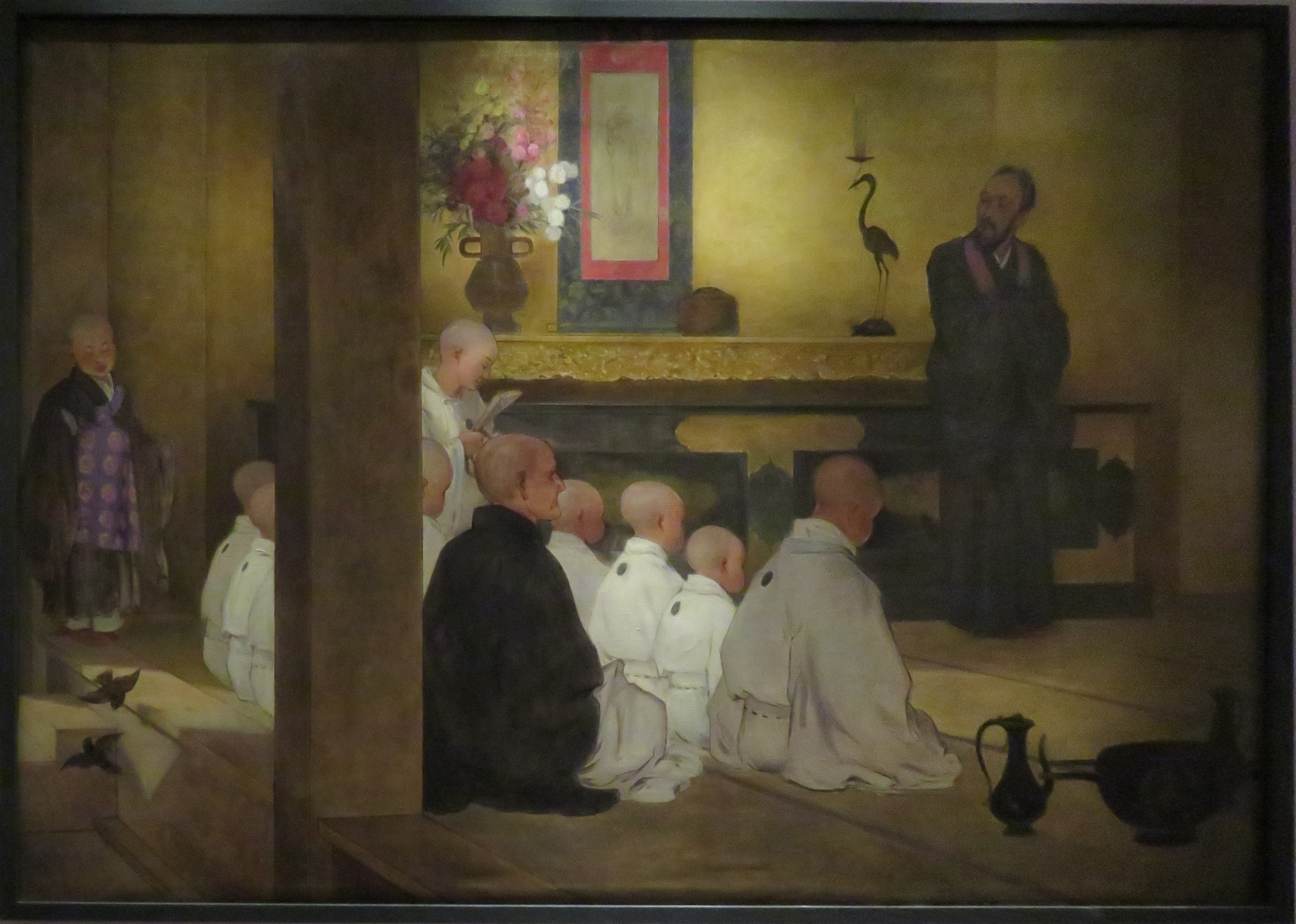
Tonsure des séminaristes dans le temple de Honganji à Kyoto (1877) by Félix Élie Régamey

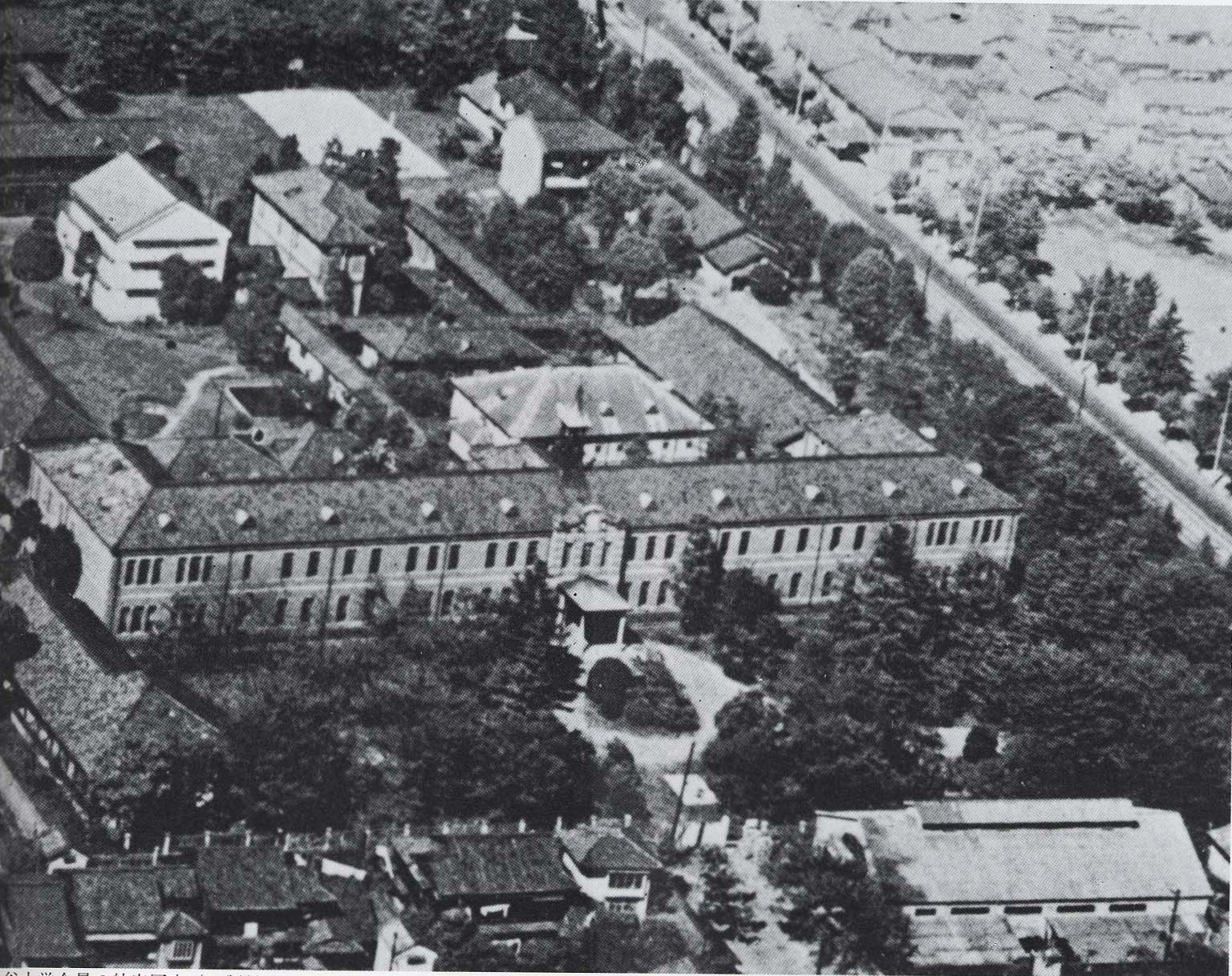
Ōtani University, 1949

The modern history of Jōdo Shinshū is marked by the radical transformation of Japanese society from the Meiji era (1868–1912) onward. In the late nineteenth and early twentieth centuries, new currents of Western philosophy, scientific rationalism, Japanese nationalism and State Shinto challenged inherited Buddhist worldviews, contributing to perceptions that traditional Pure Land doctrine was antiquated and foreign. Non-Buddhist voices such as Inoue Tetsujirō and Hirata Atsutane also directly attacked Buddhism itself as backwards, foreign and incompatible with modern Japan.

Anti-Buddhist ideologies, along with the wish to appropriate economic power of Buddhist temples, led to the campaigns of anti-Buddhist persecution known as haibutsu kishaku ("drive out Buddhism, destroy Śākyamuni"). These were most serious between 1868 and 1872 and affected all Japanese Buddhist schools. In spite of this, a reconciliation period during the middle Meiji era led to efforts to enlist Buddhist institutions in support of government policy. Also during this time, Japanese new religions began to develop and compete with established Buddhist schools. Christianity also became legal and Japanese Christians began to proselytize and criticize Buddhism. Shin Buddhists responded to the various pressures of this era with efforts to reform and modernize Shin education, expanding it to include the study of Christianity (to better refute it), Western Philosophy, ancient languages like Sanskrit, and Indology. This period also saw the emergence of a reformist intellectual movement that articulated challenging interpretations of Shin teachings, often under the influence of Western thought and modern Buddhist studies.

Kiyozawa Manshi (1863–1903) is widely regarded as the first major "modern" Shinshū thinker who led a turn toward introspective, philosophical, and existentially framed interpretations of Shinran. His writings reinterpret Pure Land concepts in modern philosophical ways, emphasizing personal religious experience and interior realization. According to Dobbins, "Kiyozawa borrowed from Hegelian idealism—describing Amida as absolute spirit and as the single great principle underlying the universe." Kiyozawa also saw Amida Buddha as a symbol of "the infinite" rather than as a supernatural being, writing: "Amida Buddha is an expedient expression signifying the infinite, the universe as a whole, or the law that courses through and animates that universe." Kiyozawa's way of thinking became extremely influential, leading to a new spiritual Shin orientation known as Seishinshugi (精神主義), which can be translated as "Cultivating Spirituality". According to Mark Blum, Seishinshugi was "a set of principles that prioritized personal, subjective experience as the basis for religious understanding, as well as the praxis that ideally brought about realization."

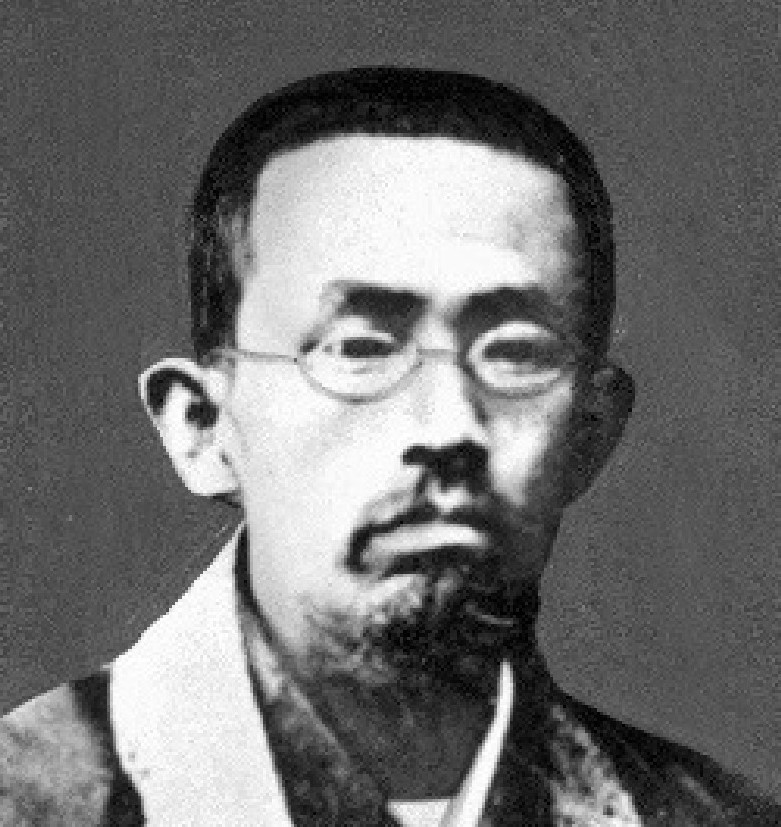
Kiyozawa Manshi

Kiyozawa gathered a group of followers, called Kōkōdō, who held discussions and published a journal named Seishinkai (Spiritual World). The group argued for the transformation of Shin education away from the rigidity of traditional doctrinal study (shūgaku) that was based on acceptance of the sect's dogmas. He also argued that Shinran's teaching pointed to an experiential encounter with other-power, something which he felt traditional Shin studies failed to communicate. Although some of his contemporaries saw him as a marginal and ultimately unsuccessful reformer, his work became the foundation of later doctrinal and institutional transformation. According to Blum, this movement was "the most important new conception of Shin thought since Rennyo reformed Honganji in the fifteenth century."

Successive generations of Kiyozawa's disciples, including Soga Ryōjin (1875–1971), Akegarasu Haya (1877–1954) and Kaneko Daiei (1881–1976), contributed to a broader modernist movement within Higashi Honganji that interpreted classic ideas from the perspective of inner religious experience. Kaneko also sought to integrate rationalism into Shin studies, asserting that even faith and nenbutsu must rest upon fundamental rational principles. Kaneko also referred to the Pure Land as a kind of Platonic "idea" and a "transcendental ideal" that influences us here and now, rather than an actual location we reach after death. The modernists also worked to center their faith around a humanized Shinran, seeing him as a model teacher, rather than as the manifestation of Amida Buddha on earth. As Dobbins writes, for the modernists Shinran was "an archetypal religious searcher or seeker (gudōsha), an individual seeking resolution to personal or spiritual turmoil and finding meaning through an inner awakening or realization of some type."

The modernist attempts to articulate new doctrinal positions provoked major pushback from Ōtani sect traditionalists, leading to controversies that included accusations of heresy. Institutional conflicts at Ōtani University which included expulsions of Kiyozawa, Soga, and Kaneko, resignations, reinstatements, and mass student withdrawals reflected deep divisions between modernist reformers and defenders of traditional Pure Land doctrine. While the conservative authors who rejected doctrinal modernist trends have often been depicted as mere reactionaries, they were just as sophisticated in their use of new philosophical concepts and modern media. The conservative critique of Seishinshugi modernism can be seen in the late writings of Murakami Senshō (1851–1929). Murakami had been part of the modernist movement himself, but he repudiated all of it in his late writings. One of Murakami's main critiques focused on Kaneko's view of Amida and the Pure Land as a philosophical "idea", a view that rejected the existence of Amida as an actual being as "superstition". For Murakami, this view indicated that modernists like Kaneko failed to understand the real meaning of Pure Land Buddhism, and equated their rejection of the Pure Land with ancient "mind-only pure land" views influenced by Zen. Also, from Murakami's point of view, it made no sense for someone who did not accept basic Pure Land principles to be a Shin cleric studying at Shin institutions. While the modernists wrote fine philosophy, it was not in line with the Shin faith, so they should do it outside of the bounds of Shin religious institutions.

Other important modern Shin scholars include Shimaji Mokurai (1838–1911), Nanjō Bun'yū (1849–1927), Inoue Enryō (1858–1919), and Kenryō Kanamatsu (1915–1986). Takakusu Junjirō (1866–1945) was another key Shin figure, known for his promotion of Buddhist education, founding of Musashino University (originally a women's school), and for leading the project to compile the Taishō shinshū daizōkyō, the most influential modern edition of the Chinese Buddhist Canon. Some Shin scholars became known for their academic study of Buddhism, including Susumu Yamaguchi and Takamaro Shigaraki (1926–2014). Count Ōtani Kōzui, the 22nd monshu of Nishi Hongan-ji, was also known for his role in the exploration of Silk Road sites and the 1902 Ōtani expedition. Shinran's ideas were also popularized by Kurata Hyakuzō's The Priest and His Disciples (1918), a play that presented a romanticized view of Shinran that was very culturally influential. It led to a Shinran craze (the "Shinran kaze no dairyūkō") that swept Japan in the 20s and 30s, and to wave of new popular books on Shinran. This also led to a new wave of Shinran scholarship that challenged traditional hagiography, as scholars like Tsuji Zennosuke (1877–1955), Washio Kyōdō (1875–1928), and Nakazawa Kenmyō (1885–1946) attempted to discover the real historical Shinran by studying newly discovered materials like Eshinni's letters.

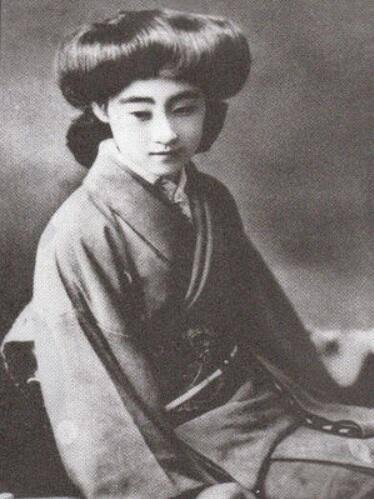
Takeko Kujō

An influential Shin woman leader during the modern era was Takeko Kujō (1887–1928), one of the founders of the Buddhist Women's Association. Takeko led humanitarian efforts after the Great Kantō earthquake, including sponsoring the construction of Asoka Hospital, one of Japan's first modern medical centers. She is also known for her Shin poetry and essays, some of which have been translated in Leaves of my Heart (2018).

During Japan's period of imperialistic wars, political pressure from the government added further complexity to internal debates within the Higashi sects. Both Higashi and Nishi Honganji had long maintained cooperative relationships with state authorities, a pattern intensified during the Pacific War (1931–1945). Under governmental demands to align Buddhist teaching with national ideology, Honganji leadership taught loyalty to the emperor and the state, censored scriptural passages critical of past emperors and supported state policies. The 20th head of Nishi, Kōnyo, wrote an influential text that mapped obedience to the emperor and imperial law into the Buddhist concept of conventional truth, retaining the ultimate truth for religious matters. Some modernist figures, including Soga and Kaneko, also advanced interpretations that could be assimilated to imperial nationalism, equating the Pure Land with the Japanese nation and Amida's vows with imperial vows. After Japan's defeat, Shin leaders acknowledged these wartime positions as mistaken and apologized for their acts. The Allied occupation also purged several Buddhist leaders, and both Soga and Kaneko were temporarily removed from academic posts. Postwar economic hardship, declining public confidence, and competition from Japanese new religions further destabilized the Shinshū communities.

=== Post-war Japan ===
The cumulative effect of the conflicts between the modernists and the conservatives was the development of a contemporary Shin Buddhism shaped by modern ideas, institutional struggles, and broader socio-political forces. One lasting effect of the modernist reform efforts was the rise of Shin activism based around social and political problems, such support for burakumin. Another impact was the reform of Ōtani Branch administration into a more democratic institution based on a representative assembly as well as limits on the head priest.

In the postwar decades, a modernist faction within the Higashi Honganji administration gained institutional influence and reoriented propagation toward lay religious life, emphasizing personal spiritual awakening, introspection, and communal life. Reformers such as Kurube Shin'yū (1906–1998), and later Akegarasu Haya (1877–1954), sought to translate Kiyozawa's Seishinshugi thought into practical religious programs, including retreats, district lectures, and lay education initiatives that eventually developed into the Dōbōkai movement of the 1960s. Modernist publications, such as the journal Shinjin, presented accounts of ordinary practitioners who discovered Buddhist meaning in daily life, illustrating a shift in emphasis from expectations of postmortem rebirth to recognition of awakening within present circumstances. Kiyozawa's status rose through this sustained reinterpretation and promotion by his intellectual heirs.

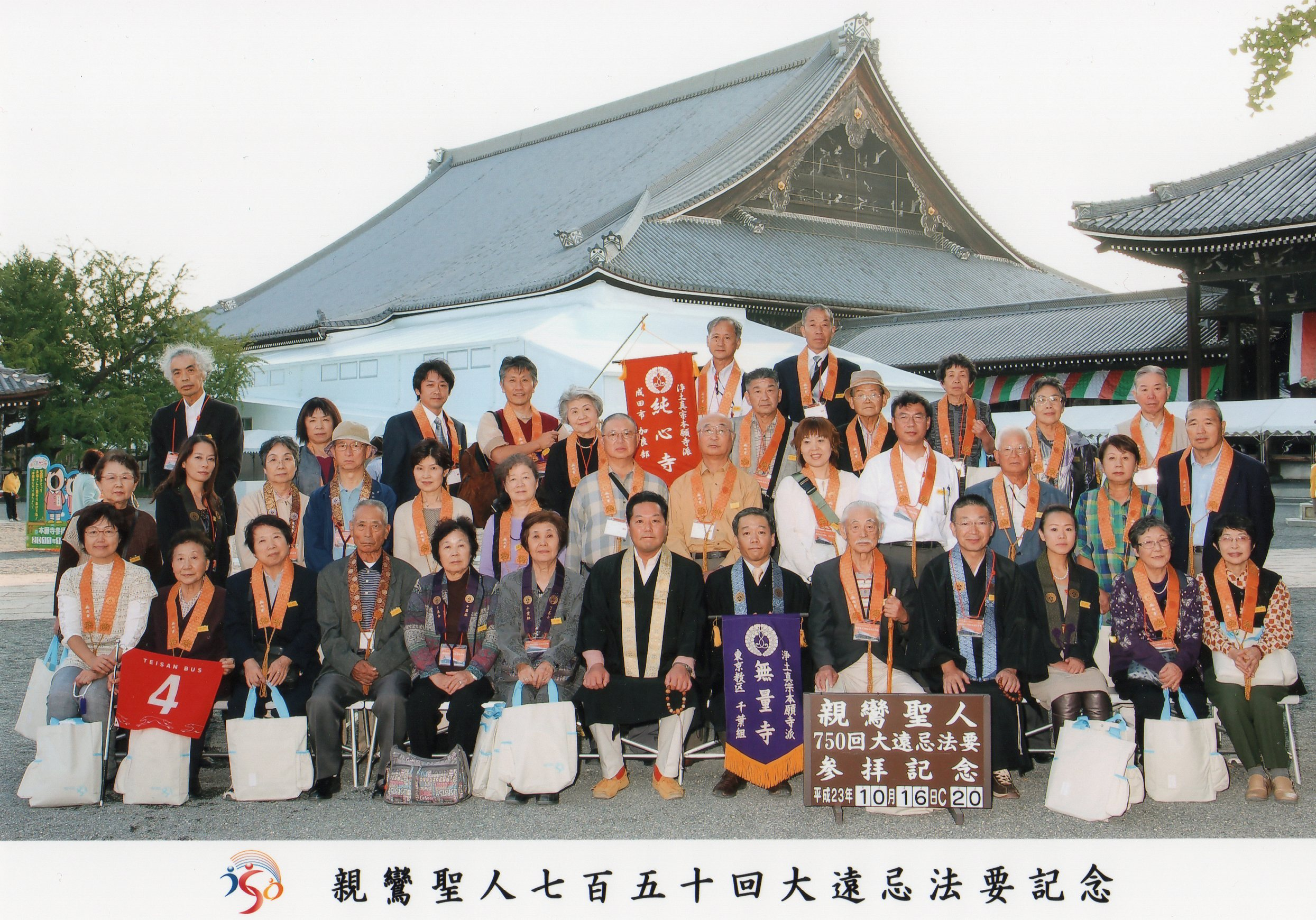
Shinran Shonin 750th Anniversary Memorial Service

Despite the influence of these Shin modernists, traditional Shin interpretations continued to resist their doctrinal innovations, and tensions within Honganji communities persisted well after WWII, eventually leading to the Ohigashi schism. According to Blum, while "Seishinshugi has been controversial from the start and remains so today," it was still extremely influential on all modern Shin thinkers, even those who rejected it. In particular, the recasting of Amida's Vow and birth in the Pure Land in existential and this-worldly terms generated both enthusiastic support and significant criticism. Some conservative critics saw these ideas as so unorthodox that they no longer saw people who espoused them as Shin Buddhists, and called for the resignation of any priests that defended it.

The post-war period also saw a boom in scholarship on Shinran and Shin history, which includes the work of historians like Hattori Shisō and Ienaga Saburō. Much of these works discussed Shinran's relationship with the common people, how he had criticized powerful authorities, how later Shin Buddhism had moved away from his ideals and the implications of Shinran's thought for society. Many popular books on Shinran were also written in the post-war era, more than for any other Japanese Buddhist founder, indicating a widespread interest.

Recent scholarship on Shin Buddhism emphasizes the complexity of the modern transformation of Jōdo Shinshū, and how it is the product of complex interactions among teachers, administrators, political pressures, educational reforms, and the lived experiences of ordinary believers. In contemporary times, Jōdo Shinshū remains one of the most widely followed forms of Buddhism in Japan. All ten schools of Jōdo Shinshū Buddhism commemorated the 750th memorial of their founder, Shinran, in 2011 in Kyoto.

== Shin outside Japan ==
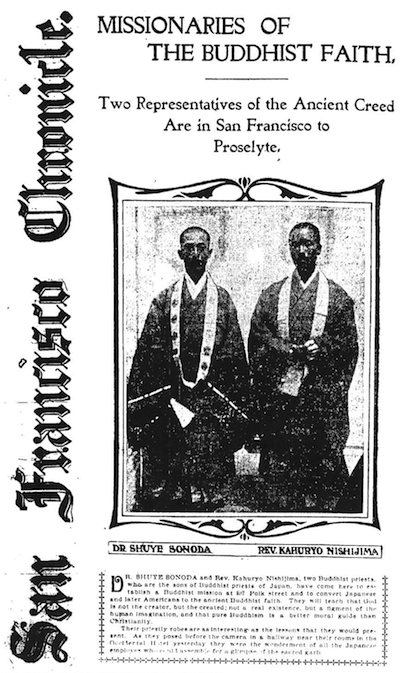
Revs. Shuye Sonoda and Kakuryo Nishijima, the first Shinshu missionaries in the US, on the cover of the San Francisco Chronicle. Sonoda later became the first kantoku (director) of Buddhist Mission of North America (BMNA).

During the 19th century, Japanese immigrants began arriving in Hawaii, the United States, Canada, Mexico and South America (especially in Brazil). Many immigrants to North America came from regions in which Jōdo Shinshū was predominant, and maintained their religious identity in their new country. The efforts of Nishi Honganji missionaries was important in the initial propagation of Shin Buddhism in the Western hemisphere. The first organized mission on American soil began when Rev. Dr. Shuya Sonoda and Rev. Kakuryō Nishijima arrived in San Francisco in 1899, forming the Bukkyo Seinenkai (Young Men's Buddhist Association) to unite Japanese Buddhists in the new land. From this nucleus grew temples across the western states—in Sacramento, Fresno, Seattle, Oakland, San Jose, Portland, and Stockton—forming what came to be known as the Jōdo Shinshū Buddhist Mission of North America.

The mainland mission developed alongside, but independently of, the Honpa Hongwanji Mission of Hawaii, which had been founded in the 1880s. In 1944, the organization was formally incorporated as the Buddhist Churches of America (BCA), now headquartered in San Francisco. Despite early struggles with anti-Japanese prejudice and the forced incarceration of its members during World War II, the BCA community persisted, maintaining Buddhist practice within the internment camps and later aiding in the resettlement of returning Japanese Americans through mutual support and shared temple spaces.

A parallel organization was also formed in Canada, the Buddhist Churches of Canada, now named the Jodo Shinshu Buddhist Temples of Canada (JSBTC). Furthermore, following extensive Japanese immigration to Brazil, a South America Hongwanji Mission was also established, which today maintains numerous temples in Brazil.

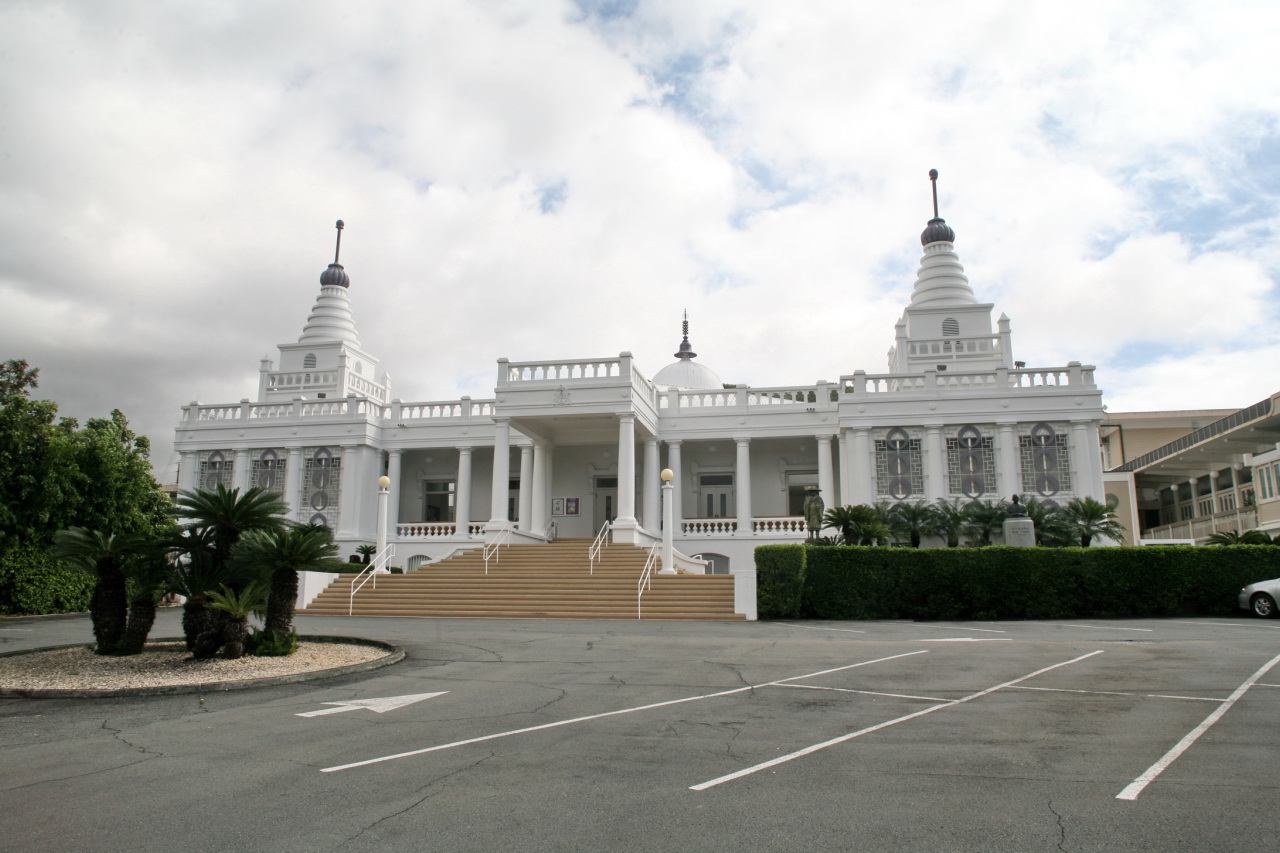
Honpa Hongwanji Mission of Hawaii, Honolulu

In the decades following the war, the BCA evolved from an immigrant religious association into a stable American Buddhist institution with over sixty affiliated temples and approximately twelve thousand members. The organization expanded its influence through education, founding the Institute of Buddhist Studies in Berkeley in 1949 as the first Buddhist seminary in the United States, now affiliated with the Graduate Theological Union.

Shin Buddhism grew in the U.S. through the efforts of numerous Japanese Shin Buddhists, Japanese Americans and even some American converts. Authors like D.T. Suzuki and Taitetsu Unno wrote some of the first English language books on Shin Buddhism. Western scholars and converts like Alfred Bloom and Roger Corless also contributed to the spread of Shin Buddhism.

The BCA has served as both a custodian of Jōdo Shinshū orthodoxy and a bridge between Japanese and Western religious cultures. It has sought to foster broader engagement with Buddhism in America through public festivals, youth and community programs, and interfaith activities, while also pioneering progressive stances such as the early endorsement of same-sex marriage and LGBTQ rights. Today, under leaders such as its first female president, Terri Omori, the BCA stands as the oldest and most established Buddhist organization in the continental United States.

Jōdo Shinshū continues to remain relatively unknown outside the ethnic community because of the history of Japanese American and Japanese-Canadian internment during World War II, which caused many Shin temples to focus on rebuilding the Japanese-American Shin Sangha rather than encourage outreach to non-Japanese. Today, many Shinshū temples outside Japan continue to have predominantly ethnic Japanese members, although interest in Buddhism and intermarriage contribute to a more diverse community. There are active Jōdo Shinshū Sanghas in the United Kingdom, such as Three Wheels Temple.

During Taiwan's Japanese colonial era (1895–1945), Jōdo Shinshū built a temple complex in downtown Taipei.

== Teaching ==
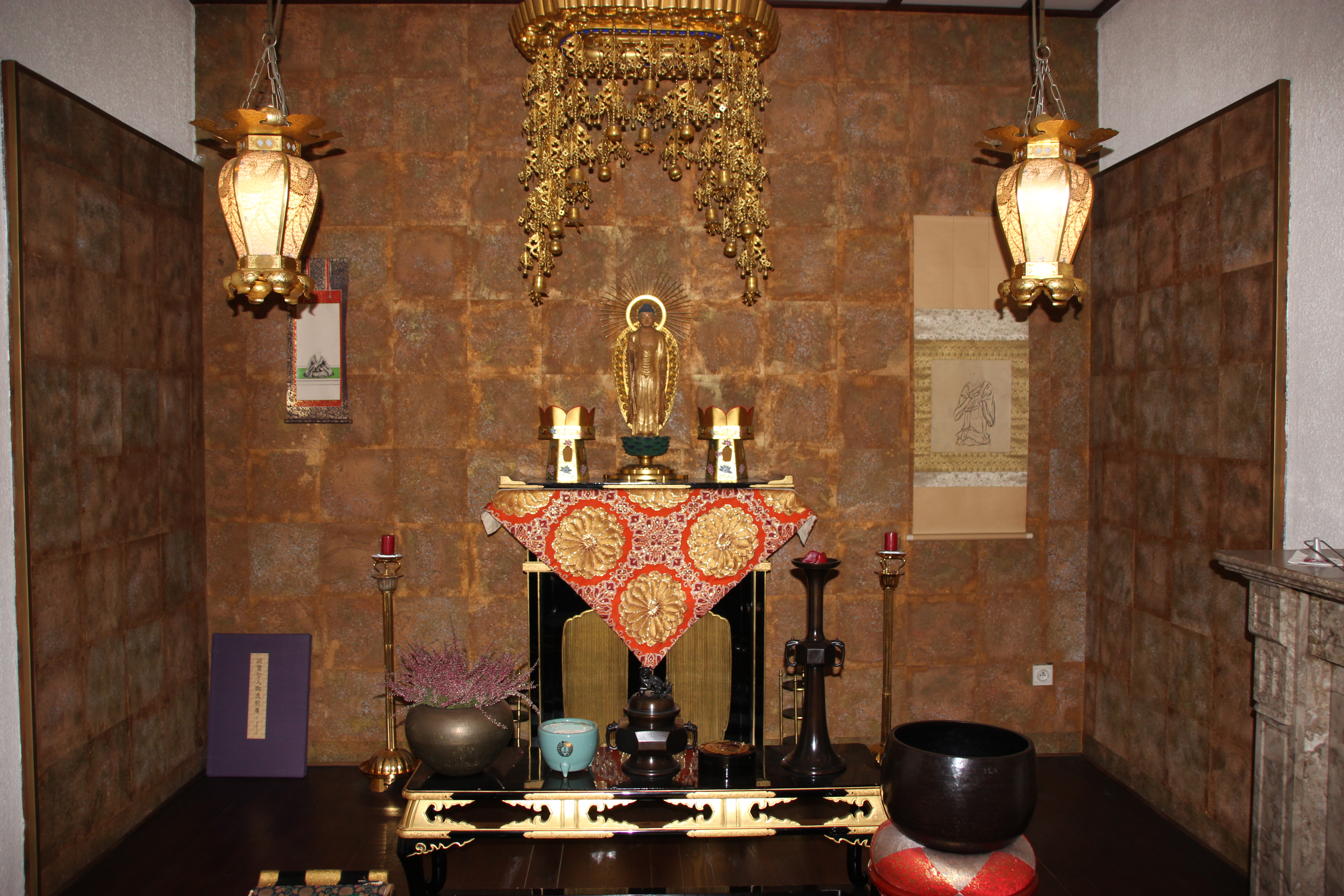
Shin altar at Jikōji (Temple of Compassionate Light)

Jōdo Shinshū doctrine and practice is based primarily on the works of Shinran, supplemented by the canonical Pure Land scriptures and the works of later figures like Rennyo. Shinran's teaching is closely based on the works of Chinese Pure Land Buddhist masters like Tanluan and Shandao, as well as on the teachings of Japanese Pure Land master Hōnen. For both Hōnen and Shinran, all conscious efforts towards achieving enlightenment through one's own power (jiriki) were defiled, deluded and useless. Only the power of Amida Buddha, channeled in the nembutsu (a praise of Amida's name), could lead beings to Buddhahood in the Pure Land. Due to his awareness of human limitations, Shinran advocated sole reliance on tariki, or other power (他力)—the power of Amitābha made manifest in his Original Vow—in order to attain Buddhahood in the Pure Land of Sukhavati.

Shin Buddhism thus holds that, in this current era of dharma decline, beings can only attain awakening through relying on the power of Buddha Amida. This reliance is called "true entrusting" or "the mind of faith" (J: shinjin, Sanskrit: prasanna-cittā). Shin Buddhism is thus described as a "natural" (jinen), "practiceless practice" by Shinran, for there are no specific acts that must be performed to attain liberation. This is contrasted with the "Path of Sages", which refers to all other Buddhist paths based on accumulating merit and wisdom through our own efforts applied to extensive ethical restraint, meditation, learning and so on. As such, Shin Buddhism is considered the "Easy Path", because one does not need to perform any difficult or extensive practices in order to attain enlightenment through birth in the Pure Land. All that is needed to rely completely and faithfully on the power of Amida's Original Vow (hongan).

=== Creed ===
The key worldview and creed of Shin Buddhism can be found in a popular short text by Rennyo known as the Ryōgemon (領解文; "Statement of Conviction") which states:

We abandon all indiscriminate religious practices and undertakings (zōgyō zasshu) and all mind of self-assertion (jiriki no kokoro), we rely with singleness of heart on the Tathāgata Amida in that matter of utmost importance to us now—to please save us in our next lifetime. We rejoice in knowing that our birth in the Pure Land is assured and our salvation established from the moment we rely [on the Buddha] with even a single nembutsu (ichinen), and that whenever we utter the Buddha's name thereafter it is an expression of gratitude and indebtedness to him. We gratefully acknowledge that for us to hear and understand this truth we are indebted to our founder and master [Shinran] for appearing in the world and to successive generations of religious teachers in our tradition for their profound encouragement. We shall henceforth abide by our established rules (okite) as long as we shall live. —Translation by Professor James C. Dobbins.

=== Amida and the Pure Land ===
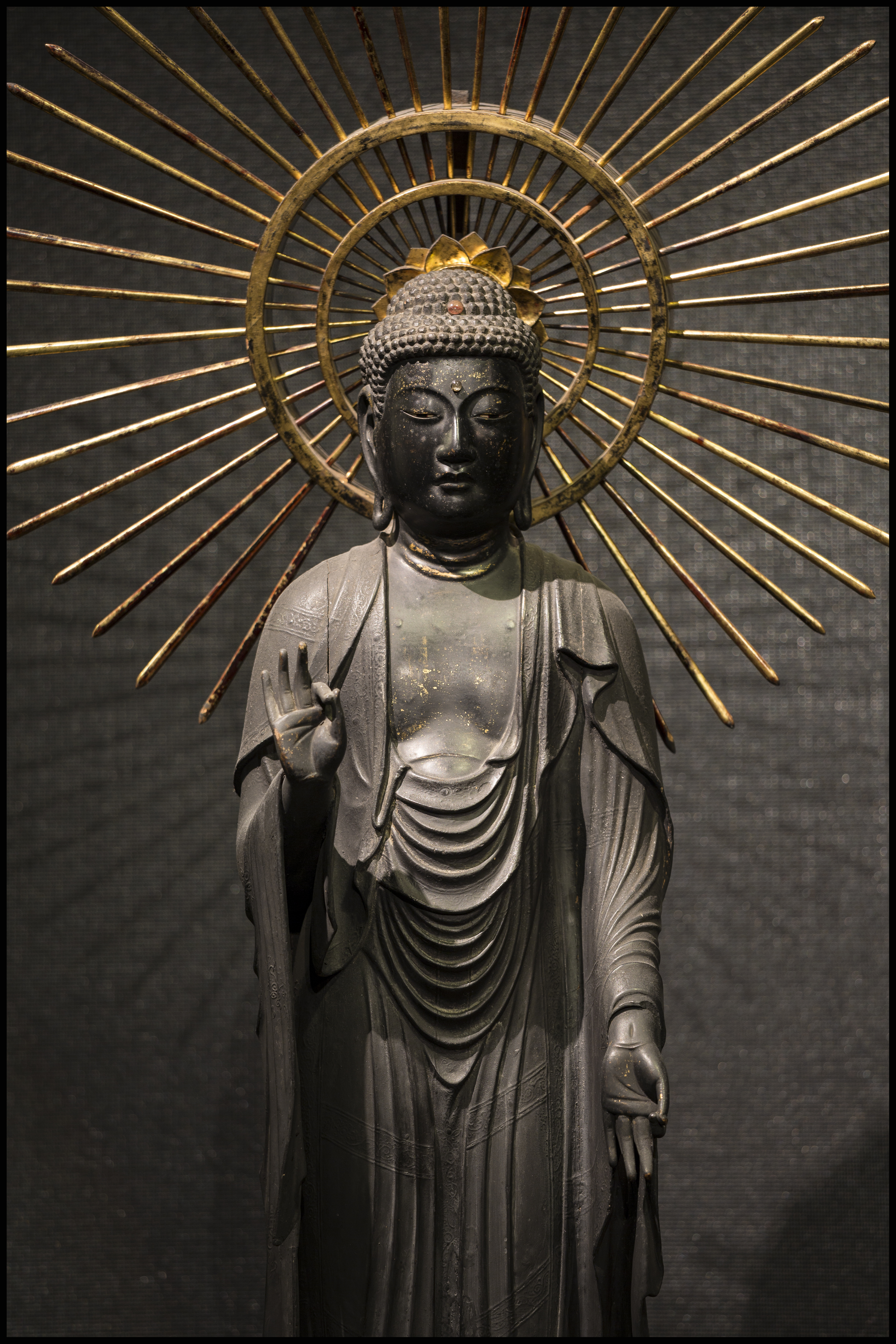
Standing Amida with light rays (48 in number, symbolizing his past vows), haloes and welcoming mudra, Museo d'arte orientale (Turin)

The central and ultimately only object of devotion and worship in Shin Buddhism is Amitābha Buddha (often called Amida in Japanese). According to Shin Buddhism, Amida is the original Buddha or fundamental Buddha (本佛, Jp: honbutsu), who is praised by all other Buddhas as supreme as per the Pure Land sutras. As per Shinran and Shandao, Amida Buddha is understood as a retribution-body (sambhogakāya) Buddha, the fruition of Dharmākara bodhisattva's aeons-long bodhisattva career long ago, beginning with his making of the Original Vow, which is thus seen as the heart of his compassionate power. However, Shinran also sees Amida as the direct compassionate manifestation of the formless, inconceivable Dharmakāya (the ultimate reality). In this view, from the "ocean of suchness", a form arose as Bodhisattva Dharmākara, whose Great Vow was the heart of Buddhahood. Hence Amida is the "Dharmakāya as skillful means", manifesting as unobstructed light covering the entire cosmos, which is Buddha wisdom itself.

Shinran thus emphasizes the non-duality between the formless and form aspects of the Dharmakāya. The Original Buddha's manifestation as Infinite Light is spontaneous, natural, and beyond all conceptual categories, and the Pure Land itself is ultimately not a spatial or temporal domain but the locus of awakening where ignorance is overturned. While conventional descriptions of jeweled lands and radiant bodies are upheld as compassionate means, their ultimate nature is vast, boundless, and inconceivable. For a person of true faith (shinjin), birth in the Pure Land entails the realization of the Dharmakāya and thus Nirvana. Nevertheless, at the conventional level Amida's body, name, and land appear so that deluded beings may be instructed. Thus Shinran articulates a path that affirms Mahāyāna non-dualism at the ultimate level while retaining the functional dualities needed for conventional religious practice, which are nevertheless harmonized within the Buddha's inconceivable wisdom and compassion.

Later Shin figures like Zonkaku and Rennyo clarified the status of Amida Buddha further, arguing that Amida was the original Buddha (honbutsu), who was the source or ground (honji) out of which all other Buddhas and bodhisattvas emanated from.

=== Shinjin and Nembutsu ===
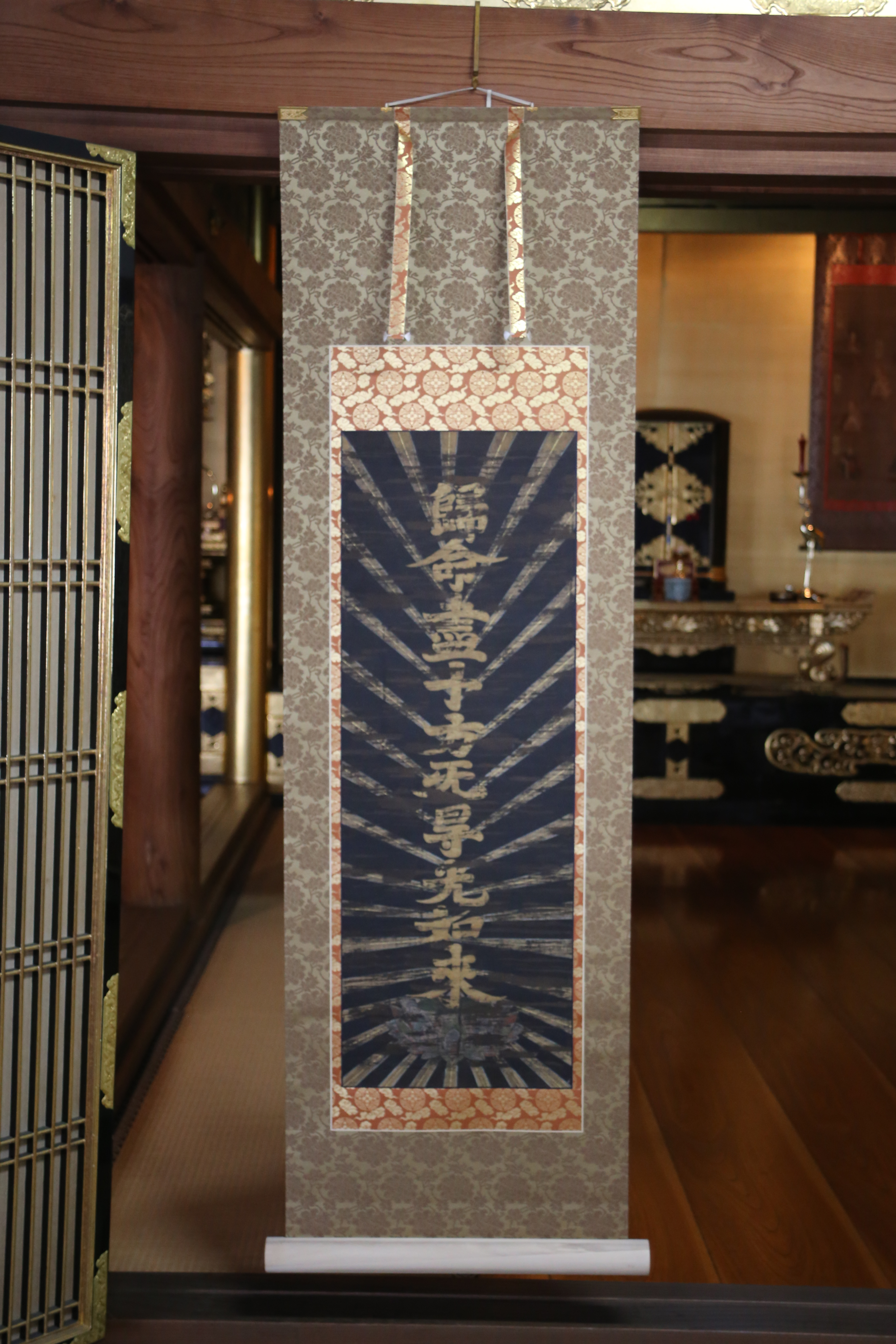
A scroll of the "ten character" nembutsu, which states "I take refuge in the Tathāgata of Unobstructed Light Suffusing the Ten Directions" (帰命尽十方無碍光如来, J: Kimyō jin jippō mugekō nyorai)

At the center of the Shin path is the attainment of the true mind of faith (shinjin) in Amida Buddha's liberating other-power (tariki) and its grateful expression through the nembutsu (the classic Pure Land devotional phrase "Namo Amida Butsu", Homage to Amida Buddha). Shinjin has been translated in different ways such as "faith" or "true entrusting", and it also often simply left untranslated. Shinran places the nembutsu at the center of Pure Land practice but interprets it through the lens of shinjin, which he identifies as the very core of the "true practice". Following Tanluan and Shandao, he teaches that true faith entails a twofold awareness: recognition of one's radical incapacity for awakening as a deluded being, and trust in the liberating efficacy of Amida's vows. All forms of self-power (jiriki), whether moral striving, meditative effort, attempts to accumulate merit, or any form of "calculation", are all understood as impediments to true entrusting. Only when a person fully realizes the futility of self-powered effort does the mind open to receive Amida's gift of shinjin, a state that is simultaneously absolute trust and profound awareness of one's defilements. This true entrusting is, for Shinran, the sole cause of birth in the Pure Land and equivalent to bodhicitta, buddha-nature, and even ultimate reality itself.

Shinran holds that shinjin does not arise from human will or practice but is bestowed entirely by Amida as the working of the Original Vow. The nembutsu, the Name of Amida itself, is the efficient cause of liberation, manifesting in recitation, teaching, and subjective experience. In Shinran's reading of the eighteenth vow of the Larger Sutra, the "one thought-moment" refers not to a temporal instant but to the "single mind" free of doubt, which is the Buddha's own mind directed toward beings. Thus shinjin is the Buddha's wisdom operating within the practitioner, and recitation of nembutsu becomes the spontaneous expression of that wisdom rather than a means of merit-making. Furthermore, since shinjin is a gift from Amida, it arises from jinen (自然, naturalness, spontaneous working of the Vow) and cannot be achieved through conscious effort but through a natural letting go. Thus, for Jōdo Shinshū practitioners, shinjin develops over time through "deep hearing" (monpo) of the Dharma and of Amida's call, which is the nembutsu itself. According to Shinran, "to hear" means "that sentient beings, having heard how the Buddha's Vow arose—its origin and fulfillment—are altogether free of doubt." The nembutsu is thus understood as an act that expresses gratitude to Amitābha. It is not considered a "practice" in an instrumental sense which generates karmic merit. Instead, the nembutsu is an expression of faith and gratitude in the Buddha's infinite benevolence which is the source of the nembutsu itself.

Due to the importance of faith, a key distinction in Shin Buddhism is between those who have attained settled faith from those who have not. The latter are advised to recite the nembutsu in gratitude and aspiration until shinjin arises naturally. Once true entrusting is received, the practitioner's afflictions become one with the sea of Buddha wisdom, suffused by the working of the Original Vow despite the continuity of ordinary existence. The nembutsu then functions solely as an expression of gratitude and as the natural activity of Buddhahood within the devotee. Because all true practice and the attainment of Buddhahood arise exclusively from Amida's power, Shinran's system has been characterized as "absolute other-power", a complete surrender of self-power in which all efforts are relinquished and the devotee is assured of birth in the Pure Land. This distinguishes Shin Buddhism from other Pure Land schools including Jōdo-shū, which argues that one must make an effort to repeat the nembutsu extensively and that this is important for attaining birth in the Pure Land. It also contrasts with other Buddhist schools in China and Japan, where nembutsu recitation was part of more elaborate rituals and systems of practice.

The biggest doctrinal difference with the Jōdo-shū lies in the concept of "Other Power" (Tariki). The Jōdo-shū holds that if we have faith and recite the nembutsu accordingly, we will be saved. Thus they hold that the main cause of birth in the Pure Land is the nembutsu. However, Jōdo Shinshū holds the view that shinjin (true faith, the mind of trust) is the main cause of birth in the Pure Land, not the saying of the "Namu Amida Butsu". The nembutsu in Shin Buddhism is merely a manifestation of the true faith and an expression of gratitude in our being already saved by Amida. It is not an instrumental practice that causes our birth in the Pure Land.

=== Realization and birth ===
Shin Buddhism follows Shinran's schema of the Pure Land to explain the differing results attained by nembutsu practitioners after death. Shin distinguishes two main aspects of the Pure Land: (1) the Transformed Land, perceptible to ordinary beings and attained by those who practice with partial reliance on self-power; (2) and the Truly Fulfilled Land, which is inconceivable and identified with Buddhahood itself, and realized only by those who attain shinjin. The Transformed Land is also associated with the concept of the "Borderland", where beings still burdened by doubt are born in lotus pods and remain temporarily separated from seeing Amida. Although Shinran proclaims the Fulfilled Land where one instantly attains Buddhahood as the real goal of the eighteenth vow, all provisional transformed lands are still seen as compassionate manifestations of the Original Vow.

In another departure from more traditional Pure Land schools, Shinran advocated that birth in the Pure Land was settled in the midst of this life. At the moment one entrusts oneself to Amitābha, the "one thought-moment of shinjin", one becomes "established in the stage of the truly settled." This is equivalent to attaining the stage of non-retrogression on the bodhisattva path. This single, timeless event of shinjin fuses finite existence with the boundless reality of the Original Vow and opens the heart to the nirvanic realm that pervades all reality. Thus, Jōdo Shinshū teaches that the moment one attains shinjin ketsujō (the settled state of faith), where the desire to be saved through one's own power is completely extinguished, one's rebirth in the Ultimate Fulfilled Land of Utmost Bliss is completely assured. This is because since the mind of self-power rejects the working of Amida; when this self-power mind is abandoned, one is automatically embraced by Amida's vow power. Though still living amid samsaric conditions, the person of shinjin already abides in the Pure Land in their heart and is assured of immediate Buddhahood after death, thereby bypassing the long bodhisattva path envisioned in other systems.

Despite this assurance, Shinran rejects the doctrine of attaining Buddhahood in this very life, insisting that full awakening occurs only upon birth in the Fulfilled Land. Yet he affirms significant present-life benefits for those who entrust themselves to Amida. These include protection by devas and Buddhas, the transformation of evil into good, and the constant presence of Amida's light, deep joy, gratitude, and compassion. By virtue of the Original Vow's power, practitioners become equal in status to beings such as Maitreya, possessing "one more birth" before Buddhahood, even though their Buddha-nature remains obscured until they reach the Pure Land. Thus, through the natural working (jinen) of Amida's infinite light, the deeply rooted karmic evil of countless rebirths are transformed into goodness and compassion. Shin stays within the Mahāyāna tradition's understanding of emptiness and understands that saṃsāra and nirvāṇa are not ultimately separate. As such, this state of shinjin is a state of being open to the working of Buddhahood while also remaining a foolish sentient being. According to Shinran, the spiritual transformation which occurs subsequent to the attainment of shinjin happens naturally, "without the practitioner having calculated it in any way".

=== Evil ===
In Shinran's account, the salvific activity of Amida operates beyond the duality of good and evil. Because Amida's Vow was established precisely to liberate beings overwhelmed by the afflictions, virtuous actions have no direct role in the attainment of birth in the Pure Land. Faith alone constitutes the sole condition. On this basis Shinran articulates the principle that the very persons most burdened by evil are the primary objects of the Vow (J: akunin shōki), for their recognition of their own incapacity disposes them to relinquish self-power and rely wholly on Amida. Those who regard themselves as virtuous, by contrast, tend to depend on their own merit and thereby fail to entrust themselves fully, placing themselves outside the central intention of the Vow.

Amida's infinite compassion means that even those guilty of the gravest offenses are embraced in the Pure Land. It also means that the virtuous cannot augment or constrain the operation of the Vow. This radical position often generated misinterpretations among some followers, who advanced the view of "licensed evil", claiming that deliberate wrongdoing was permissible or even desirable because salvation was assured. Shinran rejected this as a distortion of Other Power faith, arguing that intentional wrongdoing in order to provoke Amida's compassion is itself an expression of self-power and a fundamental misunderstanding of the Vow's aim.

Shinran also held that since the world had entered the Age of Dharma Decline, the traditional Buddhist clerical precepts no longer function as effective means for practice, for the path of sages depending on rigorous moral and meditative discipline is no longer viable for most beings. In this situation, one finds practitioners who are "monks in name only", and Shinran identified himself with this condition as one who is "neither monk nor layman" yet still follows the Buddha's way. Although sometimes interpreted as eliminating ethics altogether, Shinran maintained that the nembutsu naturally generates an aspiration to turn away from evil. Through the transformative influence of the Vow, the afflictions of beings are illuminated, softened, and gradually shaped by compassion, though not eradicated in this life. Because of this, Shinran sets forth no fixed set of moral injunctions nor any expectation of perfection in the present existence. Instead, he teaches that assurance of future Buddhahood coexists with the persistence of the afflictions, which are themselves taken up by the working of Other Power. The Shin path therefore involves recognizing one's ethical limitations, abandoning self-power, and accepting one's deluded condition while entrusting oneself to Amida.

=== Deviant doctrines ===
Jōdo Shinshū's tradition of doctrinal study and scholarship developed an extensive analysis of deviant Pure Land doctrinal positions. These deviant doctrines or divergently settled faiths (Jp: i-anjin 異安心) constitute all beliefs or interpretations that deviate from the true or settled view (anjin) of the Shinshū tradition, which is based primarily on Shinran's works. These divergences have appeared throughout the history of the Shin tradition, generating much controversy and debate. Related and alternative terms include "differing meaning" (igi, 異義), "different interpretation" (ikei, 異計), and "false teaching" (jagi, 邪義). The Shin school clarifies its unique doctrine of absolute reliance on other-power by analyzing these deviations from Shinran's teaching and contrasting them with its orthodox view.

Throughout the history of Shin Buddhism, several key disputes regarding practice and faith emerged, some of which represented extreme interpretations or deviations from Shinran's teaching that says birth in the Pure Land is settled when we receive the true faith of shinjin. Thus, i-anjin refers to any view which deviates from the fundamental Shin view which holds that "Shinjin is the True Cause of Birth" (信心正因; shinjin shō'in), also described as: "Faith Alone is the True Cause of Birth" (唯信正因; yuishin shō'in). These deviations include:

- Devotedly Practicing Goodness (専修賢善; Senju Zengen) – this view overemphasized the role of ethics and diligent and effortful practice. Senju Zengen leans in a self-power direction, away from the exclusive focus on other-power. These views argue that one must do good deeds to attain birth in the Pure Land.
- Doing Evil is not a Hindrance (造悪無礙; Zōaku Mugai), a radical antinomianism which holds that one can commit evil actions with impunity since they do not hinder our birth in the Pure Land. This is considered to be opposite extreme to Senju Zengen. It is a wrong view because it conceives of the Original Vow instrumentally, as something that gives us license to do evil, rather than as something to entrust. This attitute is thus said to "presume upon the vow", something Shinran compares to taking poison because we have an antidote. It is also said to betray a lack of sincerity and faith.
- Distinguishing Between Vow and Name (誓名別信; Seimyō Besshin) stresses an excessive distinction between Amida's Original Vow (hongan) and the power of his Name (myōgō). This wrong view may hold that those who merely recite the nenbutsu with faith in it alone can only attain the inferior birth in the border land of the Pure Land. Or it may express itself in the way that one can have true faith in the Vow without any nenbutsu. These are both mistaken because the Name arises from the Original Vow, and is ultimately one with it. Thus, to see them as separate is to misunderstand them both.
- The One Recitation Doctrine (一念義; ichinen-gi) and the Many Recitation Doctrine (多念義; tanen-gi) – these are two extreme views that claim that one attains rebirth in the Pure Land either through a single recitation of the nenbutsu, or through many recitations. Both were rejected by Hōnen as well as by Shinran (in his Notes on One Recitation and Many Recitations), as falsely relying on recitation itself or any calculations related to recitation, rather than true faith in the Buddha's Original Vow. Nevertheless, shinjin is not separate from practice, so it is not so that those who have true faith will not recite nenbutsu, rather their shinjin manifests as nenbutsu.
- Belief in the recitation of the Name as the True Cause (称名正因; shōmyō shō'in) is the general instrumentalist view that one attains birth through reciting the nenbutsu rather than through faith. The idea that one is saved because one recites can manifest in different doctrines. For example, there is "unbelieving mere recitation" (無信単称; mushin tanshō), which sees nenbutsu recitation as a kind of magic spell or password that works whether you have true faith or not. The orthodox Shin position is rather "recitation of the Name as gratitude" (称名報恩; shōmyō hō'on), which sees our practice of nenbutsu as expressing our gratitude to the Buddha for unconditionally saving us and praising his virtues.
- Recollection vs. Non-recollection (有念無念; Unen Munen). "Recollection" (unen) refers to the mind filled with forms or thoughts, while "Non-recollection" (munen) refers to a meditative state without thoughts or forms, which is considered a higher, more advanced practice. However, Shinran's teaching is that Pure Land rebirth is only through shinjin in Amida Buddha's Other Power, not through meditative states or any other mental states.
- Entrusting to a good friend (知識帰命; Chishiki Kimyō; also known as 善知識だのむ; Zenjishiki Tanomu), which constitutes an over-reliance on the good teacher and believes that the right teacher can ensure one's rebirth in the Pure Land (rather than relying on shinjin alone). While the good friend is still important in Shin Buddhism, it is not as central as faith, and any view which makes the teacher as important as shinjin or as the Buddha is a deviation.
- Secret Teachings (秘事法門; Hijihōmon) these deviations were found in several lineages and sects of Pure Land esotericism transmitted in secret groups. They often relied on secret initiation rituals and esoteric teachers who could lead people through the rituals and grant them shinjin, and guarantee them birth in the Pure Land or Buddhahood in this life.
- Secret Teaching of Ten Kalpas (Jikō Hijitsu) – According to this view, our salvation was already decided ten eons (kalpas) ago by Amida's Original Vow and his attainment of Buddhahood. Thus, there is nothing we need to do apart from accepting that we are already saved, and there is no need to emphasize attaining true faith (shinjin). This view may even reject all standard Shin religious practices or preaching any Pure Land Dharma other than the secret of the ten kalpas.
- The Doctrine of One Benefit (一益法門; Ichieki Hōmon) collapses the timeline of liberation through the Pure Land path and claims that a nenbutsu reciter can attain complete Buddha-hood immediately in this present life, at the moment they receive shinjin. The orthodox Shin position on how the Pure Land path works is that while shinjin grants the attainment of non-retrogression in this life (along with other "present life benefits" like divine protection), one only attains full Buddhahood upon being born in the Pure Land after death (the "future benefit", 當益; tō-eki). Ichieki Hōmon deviates in fusing present and future benefits.
- Entrusting the Three Acts (三業帰命; Sango Kimyō), a deviation that held that the act of entrusting must necessarily manifest through physical and verbal acts (and thus that shinjin must function through deeds of body, speech and mind). The orthodox Shin view is that while true faith can lead to moral growth, persons with Shinjin can also appear like completely ordinary persons. Thus, there is no single way that shinjin manifests in a person's personality and behavior, they do not have to appear as sagely and peaceful people. This deviation was the central element of dispute in the Sango Waku-ran controversy (三業惑乱; "Disturbance of the Three Acts"), which was one of the most famous disputes in later Shinshū history, beginning in 1763.
- Birth without good roots (無宿善往生; Musukuyaku Ōjō) – this is the view that people without any wholesome karmic roots planted in the past can still encounter and believe in the Pure Land teaching and so can attain birth in the Pure Land. This view was criticized by Kakunyo, who defended the orthodox view that encountering the Pure Land path is conditional on the ripening of good roots from past lives (shukusen).
- Wishing for birth as the true cause (欲生正因, yokushō-shō'in), the view that wishing for birth in the Pure Land is the true cause for rebirth, rather than shinjin.

== Customs and practices ==
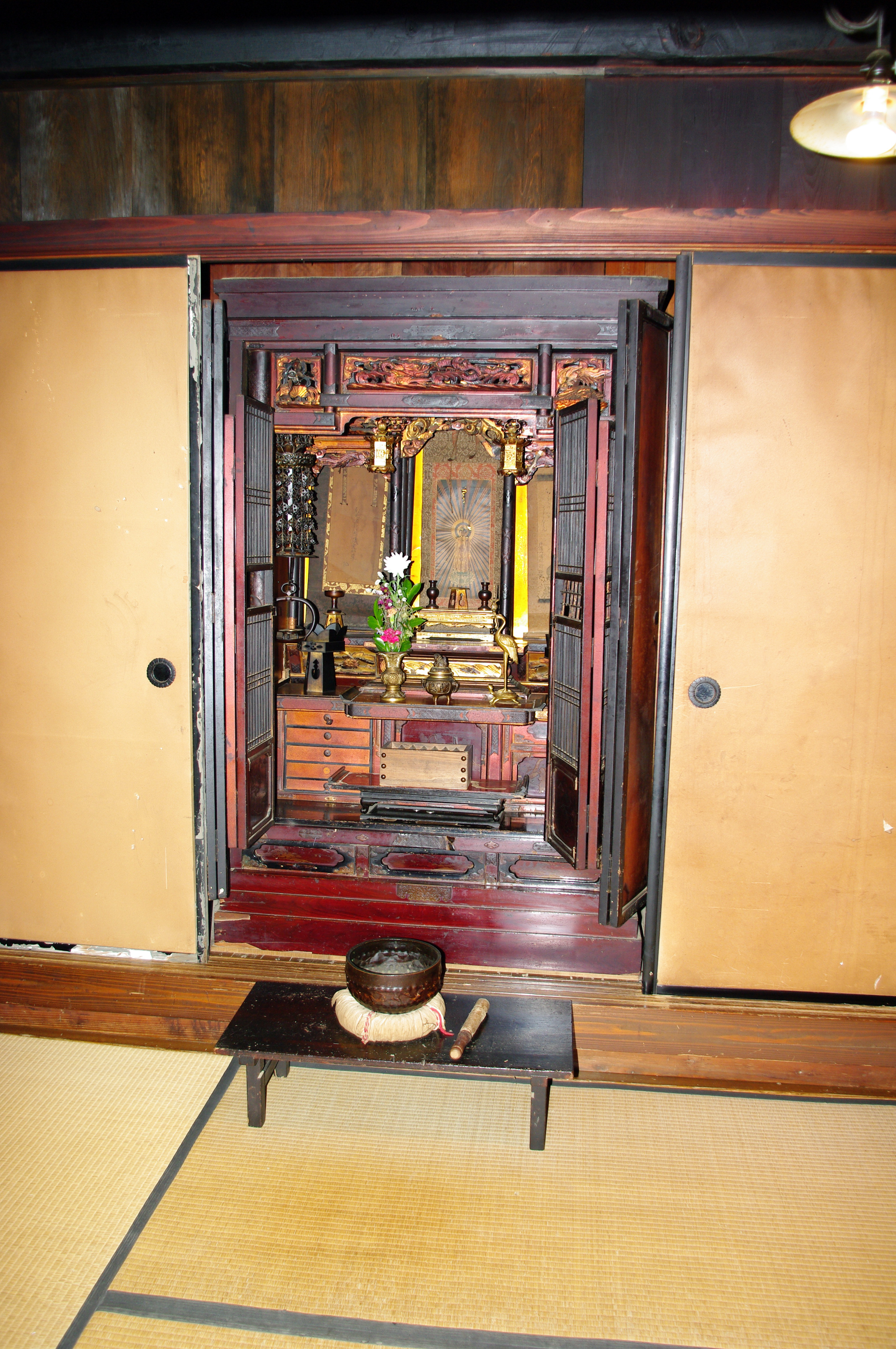
A Shin butsudan in Takayama museum

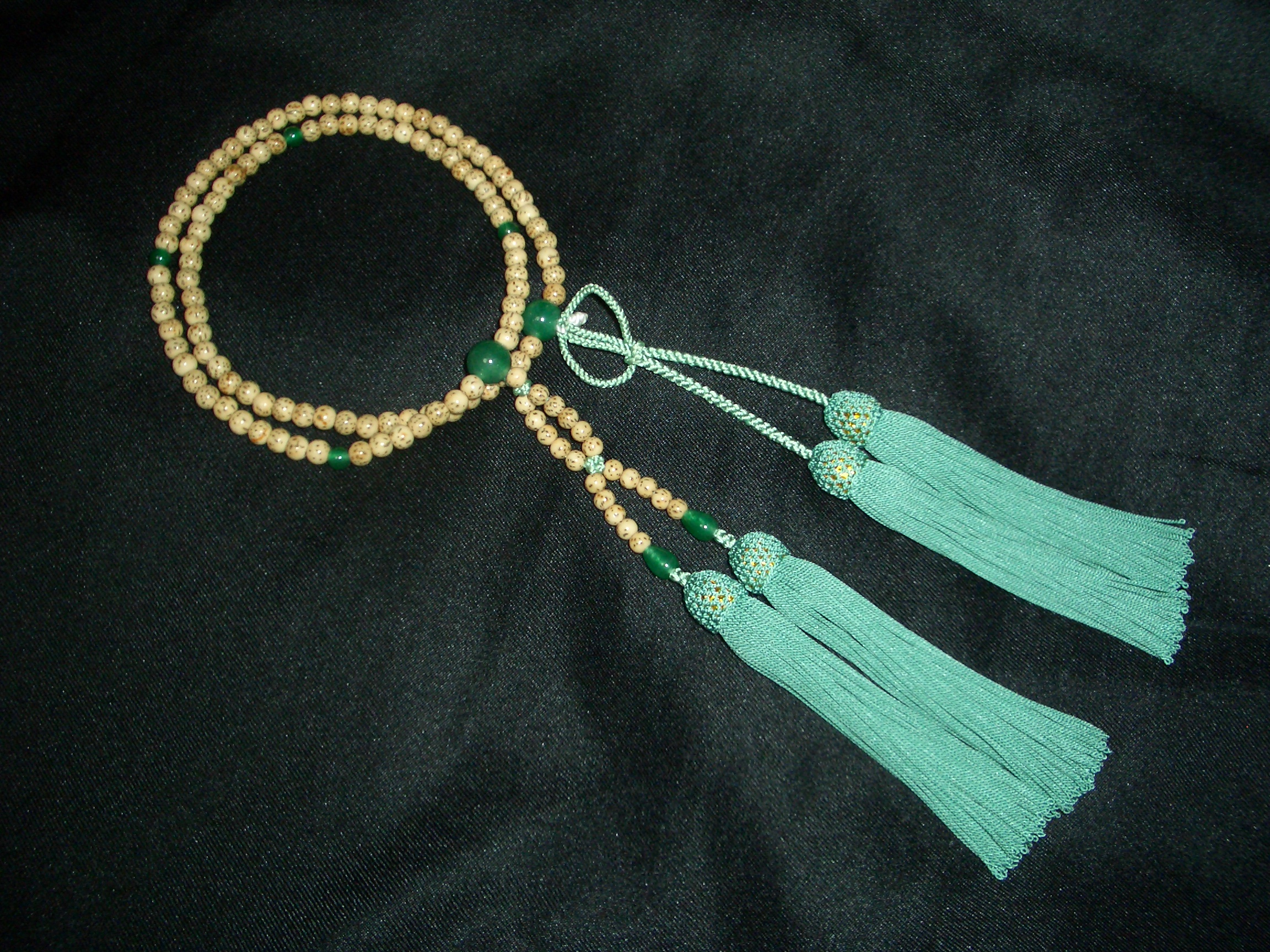
Jodo Shinshu Women's Style nenju (mindfulness beads). The unique knot on the right parent bead is called the "Rennyo Knot". These knots prevent the counting of rounds, which expresses the view that it is faith, not the number of recitations, that lead one to the Pure Land.

=== Standard religious practices ===
The central practice of Shin Buddhism is the simple recitation of the nembutsu ("Namo Amida Butsu") with faith and gratitude. This may be done at temples, at personal home shrines (butsudans) and in daily activities. It is customary to hold prayer beads when reciting the nembutsu, as well as to place one's hands together in gassho, and perform a bow (raihai) before a Buddhist shrine (butsudan). Shin Buddhists may also offer incense, flowers, candles, and other offerings like cooked rice in front of the butsudan.

Shin Buddhism also encourages the installation of a honzon (main object of worship) inside a Buddhist altar (butsudan) in every household. This may take the form of a simple inscription of "Namu Amida Butsu", a painted image, or a statue of Amida. Daily bowing and chanting of nembutsu and other liturgy in front of the butsudan is a common lay practice. Shin Buddhists in Japan traditionally use gold lacquered type butsudans. Shin butsudans are traditionally decorated with other objects such as a flower vase, incense burner and lanterns. There are specific traditional rules and requirements for these ritual objects. As the adornments are modeled after the head temples of each sub-sect, the shape and ritual implements differ by sub-sect. In Shin Buddhism, the honzon enshrined and adorned within the butsudan is seen as a "miniature temple" invited into each home, and it is not meant to be used as an ancestral altar with pictures of the deceased (as is common in other traditions).

Other Shinshū religious practices include the recitation of Shin Buddhist liturgy, including key passages from the Pure Land Sutras (such as Sambutsuge, and Juseige), hymns like the Shōshinge, the Sanjō Wasan, and Nāgārjuna's Junirai (Twelve Praises [to Amida]), along with other texts like the Ryogemon. The reading and study of Pure Land scriptures and the works of Shinran are also an important practice for some Shin Buddhists.

=== Clergy ===
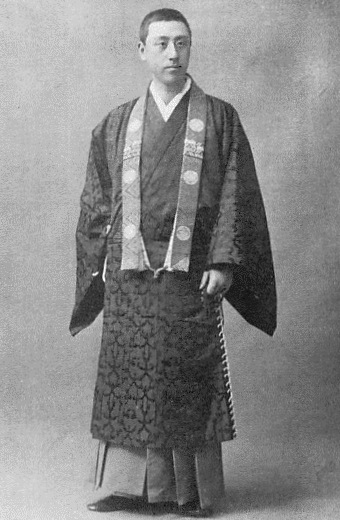
Koen Otani, the 23rd head priest of the Otani sect, in Shin clerical robes

The most significant difference between Jōdo Shinshū and other Buddhist schools (including Jōdo-shū) is its thoroughgoing non-observance of Buddhist clerical precepts, allowing its clergy to eat meat, drink alcohol and have families. Until the Meiji period (1868–1912), Shin was the only Buddhist sect where clerical marriage was openly permitted. This lack of clerical precepts originates from Shinran, who inherited from his teacher Hōnen the teaching that the nembutsu can save everyone, even those who fall outside ethical norms. However, unlike Shinran, Hōnen affirmed the importance of keeping clerical precepts, and this issue remains a significant difference between Shin Buddhism and Jodo-shu.

Prior to exile, Shinran had his monastic status stripped away, became "neither monk nor layman", officially married, and had children. Shinran held that the decline of precept keeping was a normal feature of the Age of Dharma Decline, and that birth in the Pure Land was not hindered by the lack of precepts. Shin Buddhist clergy follow this example and do not take official precepts like other Buddhist schools, not even the bodhisattva precepts. Nevertheless, they still undergo a process of ordination (tokudo), where they cut their hair, receive monastic style robes and recite statements of faith. Furthermore, Shin ministers (J: 住職 jūshoku) receive formal education in the doctrines and practices of Shin Buddhism in official universities and seminaries, just like the priests and monks of other Buddhist schools. With the rise of modern Shin education, the wives of temple priests (bonmori, "temple guardians") are also often educated as well and can perform many of the same roles.

Another key difference between Shin Buddhism and other forms of Japanese Buddhism lies in the role of the teacher and lineage. The teacher is an important figure in Shin, since it is they who introduce a person to the Pure Land path, provide guidance and help resolve doubts. Nevertheless, Shinran rejected the traditional view of formal Buddhist "master-disciple" lineage as well as any concept of Dharma transmission, famously writing that "I do not have a single disciple". Instead, Shinran, and thus Shin Buddhism as a whole, emphasize the central role of Amida Buddha as the main source of spiritual transformation. The teacher acts merely as a facilitator and instructor, not as the source of transmission and transformation. This stands in sharp contrast to Zen and Esoteric schools like Shingon, where the Zen master or Vajracharya is the main source of the transmission of wisdom or esoteric knowledge. According to Dobbins, this view has clear implications in Shin Buddhism, since in Shin the relationship between teacher and student "had to be subordinated to the primary religious concern, the personal encounter with Amida's vow."

=== Temple activities and customs ===
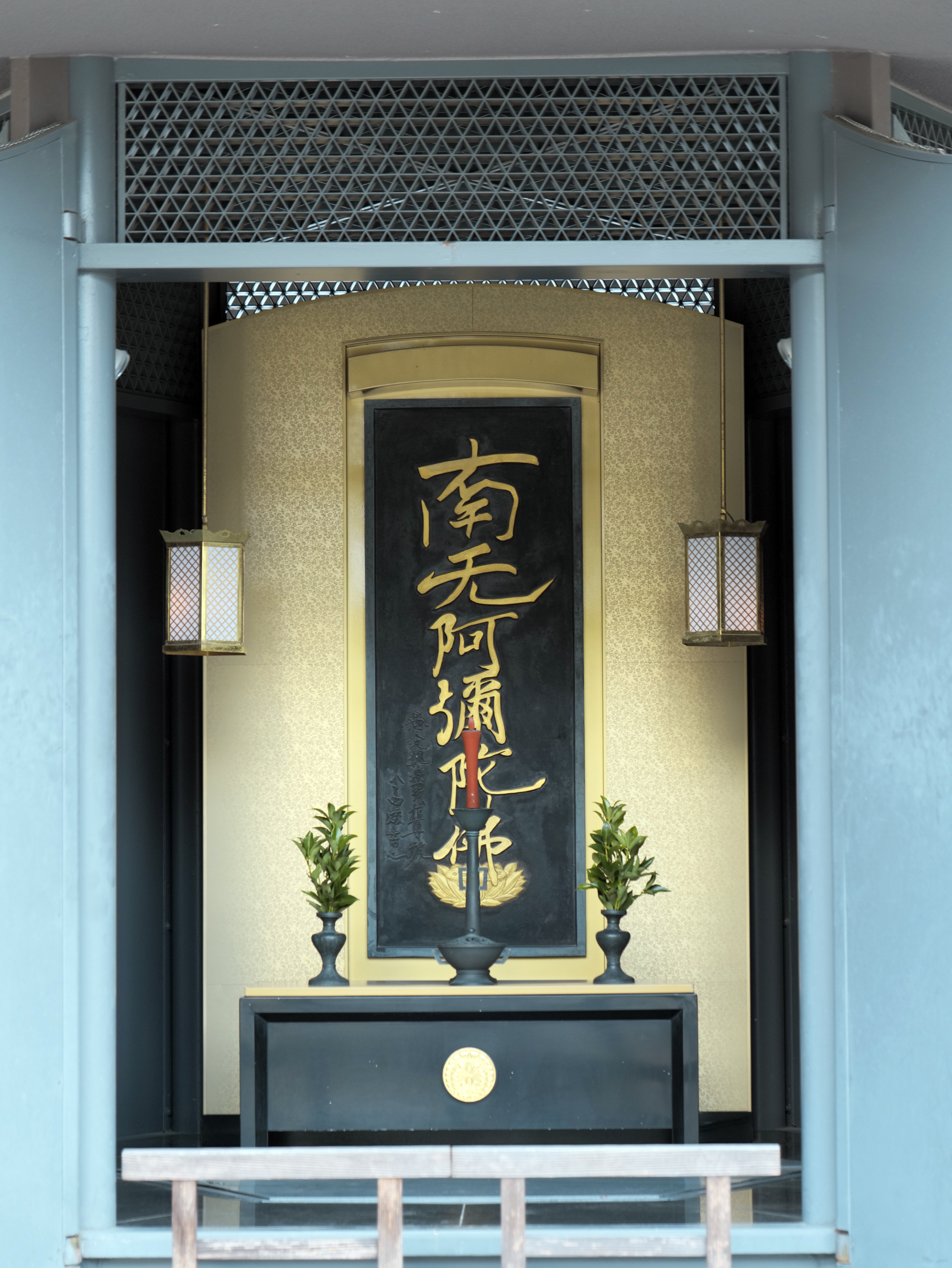
A nembutsu altar at a Jōdo Shinshū mausoleum in Higashiyama-ku, Kyoto

Shin Buddhist temples and congregations perform various activities throughout the year, including religious services, reading scripture, social activities, propagation of the teachings (fukyō), lectures (hōwa), yearly celebrations (like Obon), memorial rites (hōyō), and a variety of rites of passage.

Since Jōdo Shinshū teaches that all people can be reborn in the Pure Land by entrusting themselves solely to Amida, it does not adhere to many religious rituals and customs found in other schools (such as elaborate death ceremonies, and distribution of talismans or ofuda), instead emphasizing the nembutsu as an expression of gratitude and listening to the Dharma. Generally speaking, Shin Buddhist temples do not contain shrines for deities other than Amida Buddha and perhaps select bodhisattvas such as Kannon (manifested as Prince Shōtoku for example) or Shinran. Kami worship and Shinto shrines are thus not usually part of Shin Buddhist temples, as Shinran clearly rejected worship of these deities, and promoted exclusive veneration of Amida.

Later figures like Zonkaku and Rennyo argued that all Buddhist deities, bodhisattvas and kami were manifestations of Amida Buddha, who was their original ground and the original Buddha. As such, by worshipping Amida, one was protected by all these deities without having to actively worship them directly.

Shinran also rejected other common practices upheld by other schools of Japanese Buddhism, which he associated with self-powered efforts to gain worldly benefits and avert calamities. These included: "the propitiation of ghosts and evil spirits; divination of good and evil; belief in auspicious days, times, and directions; and observance of taboos (monoimi)."

Head temples (honzan) of Shin Buddhism always have a Founder's Hall (Goeidō) housing the true image (shin'ei) of the founder Shinran, which is a separate building from the Main Hall (Hondō) that houses the honzon representing Amida Buddha. Shin Buddhist temple architecture also has other characteristics not seen in other schools, such as a large outer sanctuary (gejin) compared to the inner sanctuary (naijin).

Shin Buddhist temples also observe traditional Japanese Buddhist holidays, like Obon.

=== Funerary services and memorials ===
All sub-sects of Jōdo Shinshū also perform a memorial service called the Hōonkō (報恩講) on the anniversary of Shinran's death, which focuses on gratitude and community by repaying the benevolence of Shinran and Amida through scriptural readings, chanting and lectures. This service is considered the most important event of the Shin liturgical calendar, though the specific date differs among sub-sects.

Apart from this, personal memorials services, funerals and other rites for the deceased are performed year round, such as ritual recitation of sutras for the dead (a rite called eitai-kyō). Another official service performed by Shin clergy is the "pillow service". This involves the recitation of Pure Land sutras for a dying person, giving them an opportunity to hear the Dharma one last time.

Unlike in other Buddhist sects, Shin memorial services are not considered to aid in the good rebirth of the deceased. Rather, these memorial services are considered to be opportunities for the living to remember the dead in gratitude and to share and listen to the Dharma. Shin funerary and deathbed rites are understood differently than those in other Japanese Pure Land traditions, which see the dying process as a key moment where one could attain birth in the Pure Land or fail to do so. Funerary rites meant to assure birth in the Pure Land were common during the Kamakura period, and included extensive periods of chanting by numerous monastics and various ritual objects. Shinran rejected the efficacy of all these rites, seeing them as self-powered efforts. For Shinran, only faith (shinjin) in Amida leads to the Pure Land, not extensive rituals or even simple chanting on behalf of others. Thus he is quoted in the Tannishō as stating "I have never said the nenbutsu even once for the repose of my father and mother." Shinran also requested not to be buried in a grave, rather that his body be placed in a river to feed the animals.

Because of this dimension of Shinran's teaching, while the Shin tradition did develop a system of funerary rites as all Japanese Buddhist schools, there was much doctrinal disagreement and debate regarding their orthodoxy and their application. When funerary rites came to be widely accepted, Shin clerics did not interpret these rites in an instrumentalist fashion as rites that could cause the deceased to attain birth in the Pure Land through the efforts of the officiants. Instead, they were generally interpreted in line with Shin orthodoxy as rites that relied on other-power. The rites could also be understood as ways of calling on the deceased for aid, since they had presumably entered the Pure Land and become Buddhas or bodhisattvas. This relies on the second interpretation of merit transference (ekō) as taught by Pure Land patriarchs like Tanluan, which refers to transferring merit to all sentient beings after having attained birth in the Pure Land. This contrasts with generating merit by performing a rite, which we can then transfer to the deceased to help them attain a good rebirth.

=== Other practices ===
Another important Shin practice taught by Kakunyo and Rennyo is the "fivefold method" (gojūgi 五重義) which relies on past good conditions (shukuzen 宿善), meeting a good teacher (zenchishiki 善知識), Amida's light (kōmyō 光明), faith (shinjin 信心); and the Name (myōgō 名号). According to Rennyo, while it is not necessary to rely on intellectual knowledge to gain shinjin, the simple recitation of nembutsu without proper understanding is also not fruitful and will not lead to birth in the Pure Land. As such, engaging in active discussions about the Pure Land Dharma with a good teacher is an important part of the path to shinjin, which is also an expression of the Buddha's wisdom. In the absence of teachers, Rennyo encouraged reading the classic Shin scriptures and reflecting on the teachings found in them. This active engagement with the Dharma is termed "hearing" (monpō 聞法), and it is seen as a key element of the Shin path.

According to Jørn Borup, "while not being part of orthodox Shin Buddhism, in recent years meditation has been discussed and accepted at official levels." Meditation in Shin Buddhism (sometimes called seiza) was promoted by modern Shin figures like Kaneko Daiei, Yoshikiyo Hachiya, Shūgaku Yamabe, and Susumu Yamaguchi. It is often presented as a way to calm the mind so that one can better listen to the Dharma without calculation (hakarai). Sitting meditation has also become popular in Western Buddhist Shin groups, some of them being influenced by Western Zen and other forms of mainstream modern Buddhist meditation.

However, this practice is controversial in Shin Buddhist organizations and considered unorthodox, since it is seen as a self-powered practice that the Pure Land founders set aside in favor of the nembutsu. While nembutsu itself originated as the meditative practice of buddhānusmṛti (recollection of the Buddha), which encompassed a spectrum of activities from visualization to ritual chanting, Shandao and Hōnen emphasized faithful vocal recitation. Hōnen went further in arguing that we should set aside other practices in favor of vocal nembutsu, and Shinran followed this view, while also reinterpreted nembutsu as an expression of faith.

== Scriptures ==
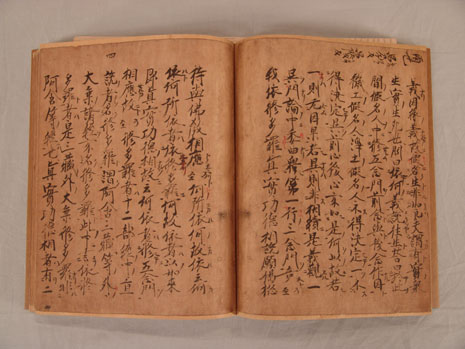
A manuscript of the Kyōgyōshinshō

The main sacred scriptures studied in Jōdo Shinshū are collected in the Jōdo Shinshū Seiten. The key works are the following:

- The Sutra of Immeasurable Life
- The Amida Sutra
- The Contemplation Sutra
- Nāgārjuna's Commentary on the Ten Stages Sūtra (Daśabhūmivibhāṣā-śāstra)
- Nāgārjuna's Twelve Adorations (Jūnirai)
- Vasubandhu's Discourse on the Pure Land (Jōdo Ron)
- Tanluan's Commentary on Discourse on the Pure Land
- Tanluan's Gathā in Praise of Amida (San Amida Butsu Ge)
- Daochuo's Collection on Peace and Bliss (Anraku-shū)
- Shandao's Commentary on the Contemplation Sūtra (Kangyōsho) along with his other works
- Genshin's Essentials of Birth in the Pure Land (Ōjōyōshū)
- Hōnen's Passages on the Selection of the Nembutsu in the Original Vow (Senchakushū)
- Hōnen's General Meaning of the Three Pure Land Sūtras (Sanbukkyō Taii)
- Hōnen's Letters
- Shinran's Complete Works (especially the Kyōgyōshinshō)
- Letters of Eshinni (Eshinni Shōsoku)
- Yuien's Tannishō
- Anjin Ketsujō Shō
- Seikaku's Essentials of Faith Alone (Yuishinshō)
- Ryūkan's On Once Calling and Many Calling (Ichinen Tanen Funbetsu no Koto)
- Ryūkan's On Self-power and Other-power (Jiriki Tariki no Koto)

Many of these texts are available in English translation as part of the Shin Buddhism Translation Series of Nishi Hongwanji's International Department.

The Honganji sect also maintains collections of specifically Honganji Shin figures, such as:

- Kakunyo's writings, such as Record of the Transmission of the Master's Life (Godenshō) and Treatise on Upholding and Maintaining [the Teaching] (Shūji-shō)
- Zonkaku's works, such as Essentials of the True Pure Land Teaching (Jōdo Shin'yō-shō) and Treatise on the Recitation of the Name (Jimyō-shō)
- Rennyō's writings, including his letters, commentaries on the Shōshinge, poems, etc.

=== Tannishō ===
The Tannishō (Record in Lament of Divergences) is a 13th-century book of recorded sayings attributed to Shinran, transcribed with commentary by Yuien-bo, a disciple of Shinran. While it is a short text, it is very popular because practitioners see Shinran in a more informal setting. For centuries, the text was almost unknown to the majority of Shin Buddhists. In the 15th century, Rennyo, Shinran's descendant, wrote of it, "This writing is an important one in our tradition. It should not be indiscriminately shown to anyone who lacks the past karmic good." Rennyo Shonin's personal copy of the Tannishō is the earliest extant copy. Kiyozawa Manshi (1863–1903) revitalized interest in the Tannishō, which indirectly helped to bring about the Ohigashi schism of 1962.

== In Japanese culture ==
Earlier schools of Buddhism that came to Japan, including Tendai and Shingon Buddhism, gained acceptance because of honji suijaku practices. For example, a kami could be seen as a manifestation of a bodhisattva. It is common even to this day to have Shinto shrines within the grounds of Buddhist temples.

By contrast, Shinran had distanced Jōdo Shinshū from Shinto because he believed that many Shinto practices contradicted the notion of reliance on Amitābha. However, Shinran taught that his followers should still continue to worship and express gratitude to kami, other buddhas, and bodhisattvas despite the fact that Amitābha should be the primary buddha that Pure Land believers focus on. Furthermore, under the influence of Rennyo and other priests, Jōdo Shinshū later fully accepted honji suijaku beliefs and the concept of kami as manifestations of Amida Buddha and other buddhas and bodhisattvas.

Jōdo Shinshū traditionally had an uneasy relationship with other Buddhist schools because it discouraged the majority of traditional Buddhist practices except for the nembutsu. Relations were particularly hostile between the Jōdo Shinshū and Nichiren Buddhism. On the other hand, newer Buddhist schools in Japan, such as Zen, tended to have a more positive relationship and occasionally shared practices, although this is still controversial. In popular lore, Rennyo, the 8th Head Priest of the Hongan-ji sect, was good friends with the famous Zen master Ikkyū.

Jōdo Shinshū drew much of its support from lower social classes in Japan who could not devote the time or education to other esoteric Buddhist practices or merit-making activities.

== Shin Patriarchs ==
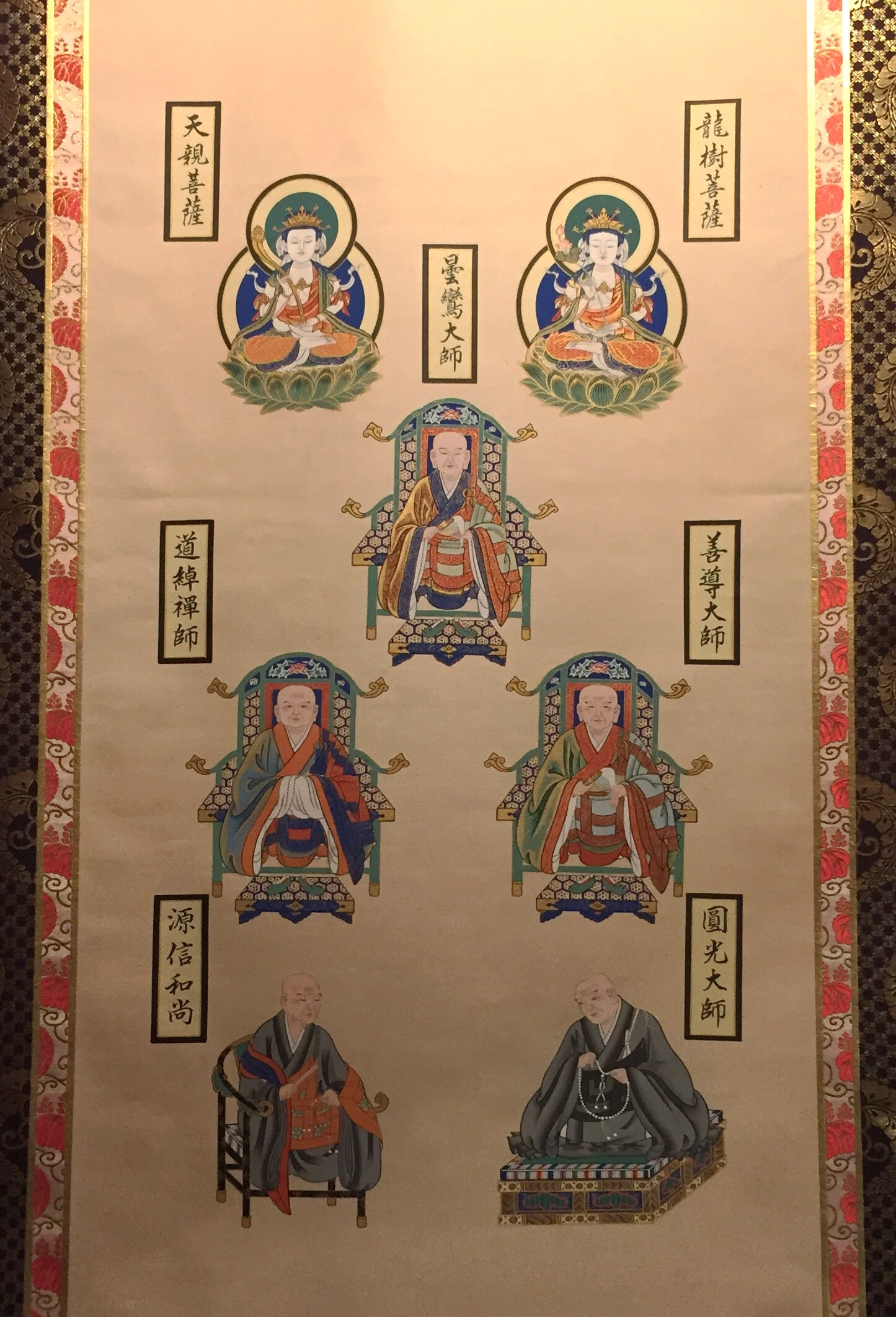
Jodo Shinshu Buddhist altar with the Seven Masters enshrined

The "Seven Patriarchs of Jōdo Shinshū" are seven Buddhist monks venerated in the development of Pure Land Buddhism as summarized in the Jōdo Shinshū hymn Shōshinge. Shinran quoted the writings and commentaries of the Patriarchs in his major work, the Kyōgyōshinshō, to bolster his teachings.

The Seven Patriarchs, in chronological order, and their contributions are:

Name	Dates	Japanese name	Country of origin	Contribution
Nāgārjuna	150–250	Ryūju (龍樹)	India	Indian master and Madhyamaka philosopher who presents Pure Land as the "easy path" in his Ten Stages Treatise.
Vasubandhu	c. 4th century	Tenjin (天親) or Seshin (世親)	India	Wrote the Discourse on the Pure Land explaining Pure Land practice.
Tanluan	476–542(?)	Donran (曇鸞)	China	Known for his commentary on Vasubandhu's Discourse, where he develops the key distinction between self-power and other-power.
Daochuo	562–645	Dōshaku (道綽)	China	Promoted the superiority of the "easy path" of Pure Land over the "path of the sages", which he held was no longer efficacious since the world had entered the "last days of the Dharma".
Shandao	613–681	Zendō (善導)	China	Wrote an influential commentary to the Contemplation Sutra where he discusses the threefold mind of faith, and argues that the verbal recitation of Amida's name should be the main practice in Pure Land Buddhism.
Genshin	942–1017	Genshin (源信)	Japan	Tendai teacher who popularized Pure Land practices as the most effective method for the era of Dharma decline (mappo) in his extensive Ōjōyōshū.
Hōnen	1133–1212	Hōnen (法然)	Japan	Popularised the exclusive recitation of the nembutsu in order to attain rebirth in the Pure Land and argued we should set aside other practices in favor of nembutsu.

In Jōdo Shinshū temples, the seven masters are usually collectively enshrined on the far left.

== Denominations ==
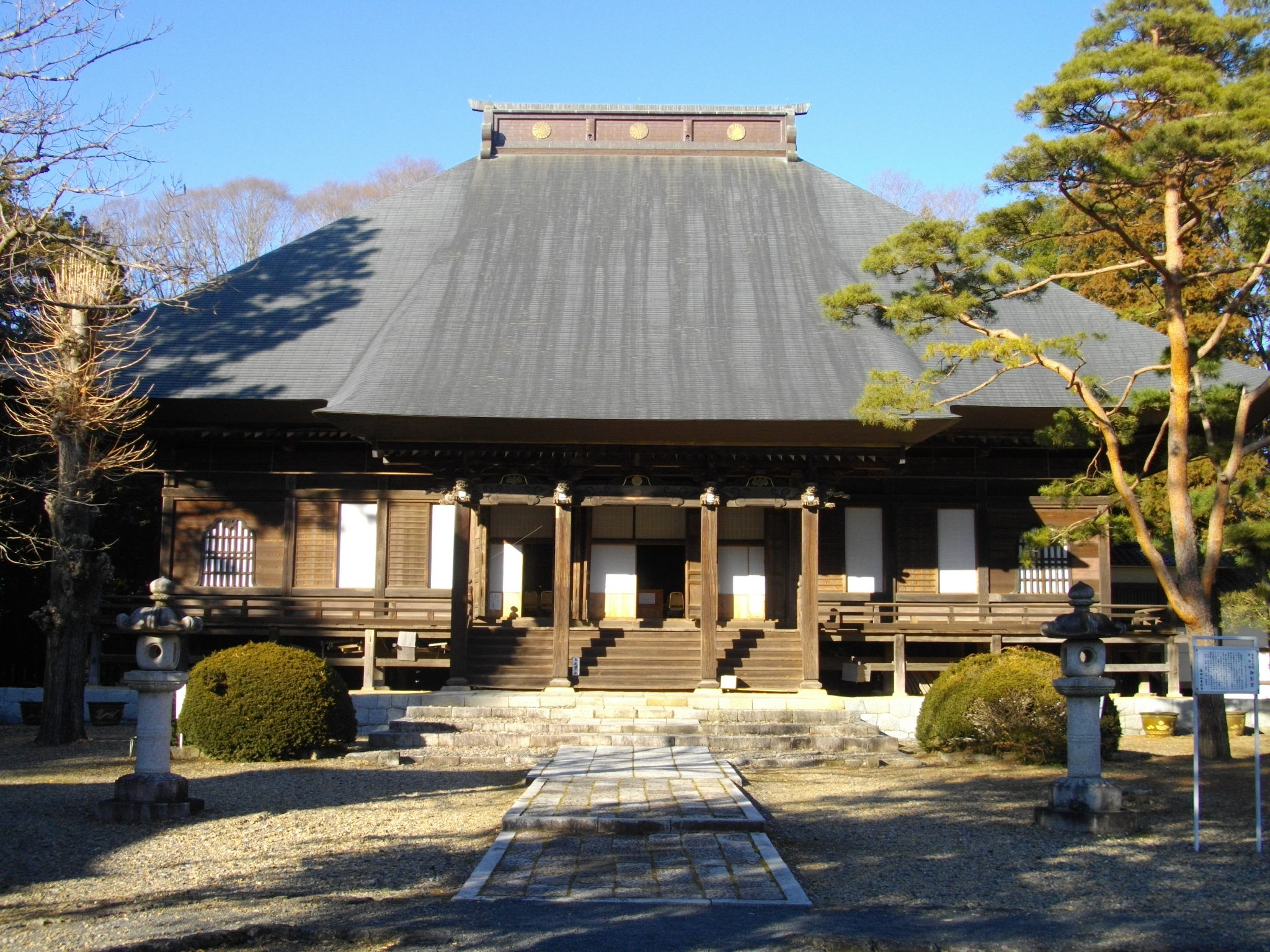
Senju-ji, the main temple of the Takada sect, known for housing several historically important manuscripts

=== Major sub-schools ===
All of the major sub-schools are part of the Shinshū Kyōdan Rengō umbrella organization. The largest tradition is the Hongan-ji tradition, which is itself divided into two main branches. The ten main sects are:

- Jōdo Shinshū Hongan-ji (Temple of the Original Vow) School forms the largest and most influential Shin tradition, tracing itself to Shinran and his family, especially Rennyo (which is seen as the "second founder" or "Restorer" of the sect). This tradition emphasizes "shinjin as the primary cause of birth in the Pure Land, and nenbutsu as an act of gratitute" (信心正因、称名報恩), a teaching that is shared by various sub-sects of Shin Buddhism. It is the source of various sub-sects that split off from it at various times. In the 17th century, the Honganji itself became divided into two main sub-sects:
  - Higashi Honganji (Eastern Temple of the Original Vow), with around 8,900 branch temples. The Shinshū Ōtani School is a major sub-sect of it.
  - Nishi Hongan-ji (Western Temple of the Original Vow). The sect has approximately 10,500 branch temples. The Nishi also has several branches in the West with some level of local autonomy:
    - Buddhist Churches of America (米国仏教団, Beikoku Bukkyōdan)
    - Jodo Shinshu Buddhist Temples of Canada
    - South America Hongwanji Mission
- Shinshū Bukkōji School, with the head temple at Bukkō-ji in Kyoto and branch temples in the three hundreds. It regards Shinbutsu as its founder (so) and Ryōgen as its restorer (chūkō no so), and traces itself back to the lineage of the Araki Monto, centered around Mampukuji in Araki (present-day Gyōda City, Saitama Prefecture), led by Genkai, which was a branch of Shinbutsu's Takada monto. A distinctive feature of this sub-school is the recording of names in "salvation registers" (myōchō 名帳) which recorded all followers who had achieved shinjin, and the use of "portrait lineages" (ekeizu 絵系図) of the sect's priests.
- Shinshū Takada School, with its head temple at Senju-ji in Tsu, Mie Prefecture and branch temples in the six hundreds. It traces its origins to Shinran's direct disciples Shinbutsu and Kenchi, and the early 13th-century founding of Senjuji in Shimotsuke Province. It is regarded as the "dharma lineage sect", maintaining a distinct tradition that emphasizes its direct transmission from Shinran. The Takada lineage was later institutionalized by the fourth head Sengu (1292–1343), and the restorer Shin'ne (1434–1512), who moved the head temple to Mie Prefecture. Shin'ne is credited Takada's distinctive emphasis on "faith and practice together" (信行具足 shin-gyō-gusoku), which differs from the Hongan-ji understanding. In the Takada school, true faith arises from nenbutsu recitation, and they must both be present to achieve birth. They do not emphasize shinjin over nenbutsu, nor do they see nenbutsu as a mere act of gratitude, but see both as equally important, emphasizing their unity. The school was also associated with secret oral transmissions concerning the inner meaning of faith and nenbutsu. They also maintain a tradition known as the injō nenbutsu (引声念仏), a melodic nenbutsu chanting derived from Tendai.
  - Shinshū Kita Honganji School (Kitahongan-ji)
- Shinshū Kōshō School, with a head temple at Kōshō-ji in Kyoto and 486 branch temples. The school also traces itself to Shinbutsu and Ryōgen. The sect was part of Hongan-ji until 1876, when it became an independent sect under head priest Honjaku. Their teaching also follows Rennyo and is similar to the Hongan-ji's. One unique element of the Kōshō school is its tradition of shōmyō chanting, which retained an older more traditional style that is similar to the Tendai school's chanting while the Hongan-ji developed its own distinct style of chant after the Meiji separation.
- Shinshū Kibe School, with Kinshoku-ji (錦織寺) in Yasu, Shiga Prefecture, as its head temple. It originates from the lineage of the Yokozone Monto, centered around Hōon-ji in Yokozone (Ibaraki Prefecture), which was led by Shinran's disciple Shōshin. The number of branch temples is approximately 200.
- Shinshū Izumoji School, with its head temple at Gōshōji in Echizen, Fukui Prefecture, which was founded by Jōsen (乗専, also read Jōzen; 1295–1377), a senior disciple of Kakunyo. Jōsen adopted Zenyū (善入), Kakunyo's fourth son, as his heir. This sub-sect only became independent of the Honganji school in 1878 (Meiji 11), and thus, their teaching is very similar to that of the Hongan-ji. Nevertheless, there are some liturgical differences, such as a unique melody for the recitation of the Shōshinge.
- Shinshū Sanmontō (Three Gates) School is based at Senshōji in Fukui City. It originates from the lineage of Nyodō (如道), who was originally a member of the Takada-ha Wada Monto. It is part of the "Four Head Temples" of the Hokuriku region. Once a larger force it is now a smaller sect after a long history of doctrinal shifts, internal splits, and external conflicts. "Sanmontō" ("Three Gates") derives from the three founders: Nyodō, Dōshō (道性), and Nyokaku (如覚). The school was also known as the "Sanmon-to" (讃門徒, "Hymn Followers") because of its emphasis on chanting the Sanjō Wasan, Shinran's three collections of hymns. They were also known for their unique lineages of secret Shin teachings, including the "secret teaching of non-worship" which held that nenbutsu and worship are unnecessary. However, by the modern era, the teachings of this sub-sect are mostly aligned with mainstream Shin positions.
- Shinshū Jōshōji School, with Jōshōji in Sabae, Fukui Prefecture, as its head temple. It has approximately 70 branch temples. The sect's lineage descends from Nyokaku, a student of Zonkaku, and the son of the Sammonto leader Dōshō. The Jōshōji sect emphasizes the use of Shinran's wasans and the Shōshinge to spread the teachings, and do not follow the writings of Rennyo. The liturgy of the school focuses on the wasans and the Shōshinge, using unique melodies.
- Shinshū Yamamoto School, the smallest of the ten temples, with a head temple at Shōjō-ji in Fukui Prefecture. It was founded by Dōshō, a disciple of Nyodō.

=== Other independent sects and temples ===
There are also numerous other sects, independent temples and organizations, including:

- Shinshū Jōkōji School (Jōshō-ji)
- Shinshū Chōsei School (Chōsei-ji)
- Shinshū Seishōji-ha (Seishōji)
- Jōdo Shinshū Bekkyaku Honzan (Sainenji)
- Kōgan Shinshū (Shōgenji)
- Butsugen-shū Einichikai (Ryōjuji)
- Montoshūichimi School (Kitami-ji)
- Shinshū Kita-Honganji-ha
- Jōdo Shinshū Dōhō Kyōdan
- Jōdo Shinshū Kakōkai
- Kayakabe Teaching (a kind of hidden nenbutsu)

==== Shinran-kai ====
The Jōdo Shinshū Shinran-kai, commonly known as Shinran-kai, is a Japanese new religious organization based in Toyama Prefecture. Founded in 1958 by Kōmori Kentetsu, its stated mission is to accurately transmit the traditional teachings of Shinran. While its core doctrines align with Honganji orthodoxy, it positions itself as a reform movement, strongly criticizing mainstream temples for having strayed from Shinran's original message. The group emphasizes achieving shinjin so as to escape hell and attain birth in the Pure Land, venerates its founder Kōmori as the essential spiritual teacher and the "one and only good friend" available in this present era. It has grown through zealous missionary work, publications, and animated films. The sect also bans all images and statues, using only a scroll of the nembutsu as an object of worship.

Shinran-kai is a deeply controversial group, often labeled a cult due to its recruitment methods and intense internal dynamics. It has a long history of conflict with the traditional Nishi Honganji sect and is frequently criticized for "disguised recruitment", where it conceals its identity (particularly on university campuses) to attract members. The organization requires significant financial contributions from members and has been accused of creating psychological burdens. Although its missionary tactics have drawn sharp criticism from cult experts, journalists, and former members, no illegal activity has been legally proven. Estimates of its active membership vary widely, from tens of thousands to much smaller figures, and it remains a significant, polarizing presence within the landscape of modern contemporary Buddhism.

== Major holidays ==
The following holidays are typically observed in Jōdo Shinshū temples:

Holiday	Japanese name	Date
New Year's Day Service	Gantan'e	January 1
Memorial Service for Shinran	Hōonkō	November 28, or January 9–16
Spring Equinox	Higan	March 17–23
Buddha's Birthday	Hanamatsuri	April 8
Birthday of Shinran	Gotan'e	May 20–21
Bon Festival	Urabon'e	around August 15, based on solar calendar
Autumnal Equinox	Higan	September 20–26
Bodhi Day	Jōdō'e	December 8
New Year's Eve Service	Joya'e	December 31

== Major modern Shin figures ==
- Nanjō Bun'yū (1848–1927)
- Saichi Asahara (1850–1932)
- Kasahara Kenju (1852–1883)
- Kiyozawa Manshi (1863–1903)
- Jokan Chikazumi (1870–1941)
- Eikichi Ikeyama (1873–1938)
- Soga Ryōjin (1875–1971)
- Ōtani Kōzui (1876–1948)
- Akegarasu Haya (1877–1954)
- Kaneko Daiei (1881–1976)
- Zuiken Saizo Inagaki (1885–1981)
- Takeko Kujō (1887–1928)
- William Montgomery McGovern (1897–1964)
- Rijin Yasuda (1900–1982)
- Gyomay Kubose (1905–2000)
- Shuichi Maida (1906–1967)
- Harold Stewart (1916–1995)
- Kenryu Takashi Tsuji (1919–2004)
- Alfred Bloom (1926–2017)
- Zuio Hisao Inagaki (1929–present)
- Shojun Bando (1932–2004)
- Taitetsu Unno (1935–2014)
- Eiken Kobai (1941–present)
- Dennis Hirota (1946–present)
- Kenneth K. Tanaka (1947–present)
- Marvin Harada (1953–present)

== See also ==
- Ohigashi schism
- Hongan-ji
- Kenryo Kanamatsu

== Literature ==
- Bandō, Shojun; Stewart, Harold; Rogers, Ann T. and Minor L.; trans. (1996) : Tannishō: Passages Deploring Deviations of Faith and Rennyo Shōnin Ofumi: The Letters of Rennyo, Berkeley: Numata Center for Buddhist Translation and Research. ISBN 1-886439-03-6
- Bloom, Alfred (1989). Introduction to Jodo Shinshu, Pacific World Journal, New Series Number 5, 33–39
- Dessi, Ugo (2010), Social Behavior and Religious Consciousness among Shin Buddhist Practitioners, Japanese Journal of Religious Siudies, 37 (2), 335–366
- Dobbins, James C. (1989). Jodo Shinshu: Shin Buddhism in Medieval Japan. Bloomington, Illinois: Indiana University Press. ISBN 9780253331861; OCLC 470742039
- Ducor, Jerome (2021): Shinran and Pure Land Buddhism; San Francisco, Jodo Shinshu International Office; 188 pp., bibliography (ISBN 978-0-9997118-2-8).
- Inagaki Hisao, trans., Stewart, Harold (2003). The Three Pure Land Sutras, 2nd ed., Berkeley, Numata Center for Buddhist Translation and Research. ISBN 1-886439-18-4
- Lee, Kenneth Doo (2007). The Prince and the Monk: Shotoku Worship in Shinran's Buddhism. Albany, New York: State University of New York Press. ISBN 978-0791470220.
- Matsunaga, Daigan, Matsunaga, Alicia (1996), Foundation of Japanese Buddhism, Vol. 2: The Mass Movement (Kamakura and Muromachi Periods), Los Angeles; Tokyo: Buddhist Books International, 1996. ISBN 0-914910-28-0
- Takamori/Ito/Akehashi (2006). "You Were Born For A Reason: The Real Purpose of Life", Ichimannendo Publishing Inc; ISBN 9780-9790-471-07
- S. Yamabe and L. Adams Beck (trans.): Buddhist Psalms of Shinran Shonin, John Murray, London 1921. e-book
- Galen Amstutz, Review of Fumiaki, Iwata, Kindai Bukkyō to seinen: Chikazumi Jōkan to sono jidai and Ōmi Toshihiro, Kindai Bukkyō no naka no Shinshū: Chikazumi Jōkan to kyūdōshatachi, in H-Japan, H-Net Reviews July, 2017.
