= Hongan-ji =

School of True Pure Land Buddhism

Coordinates: 34°59′28″N 135°45′04″E

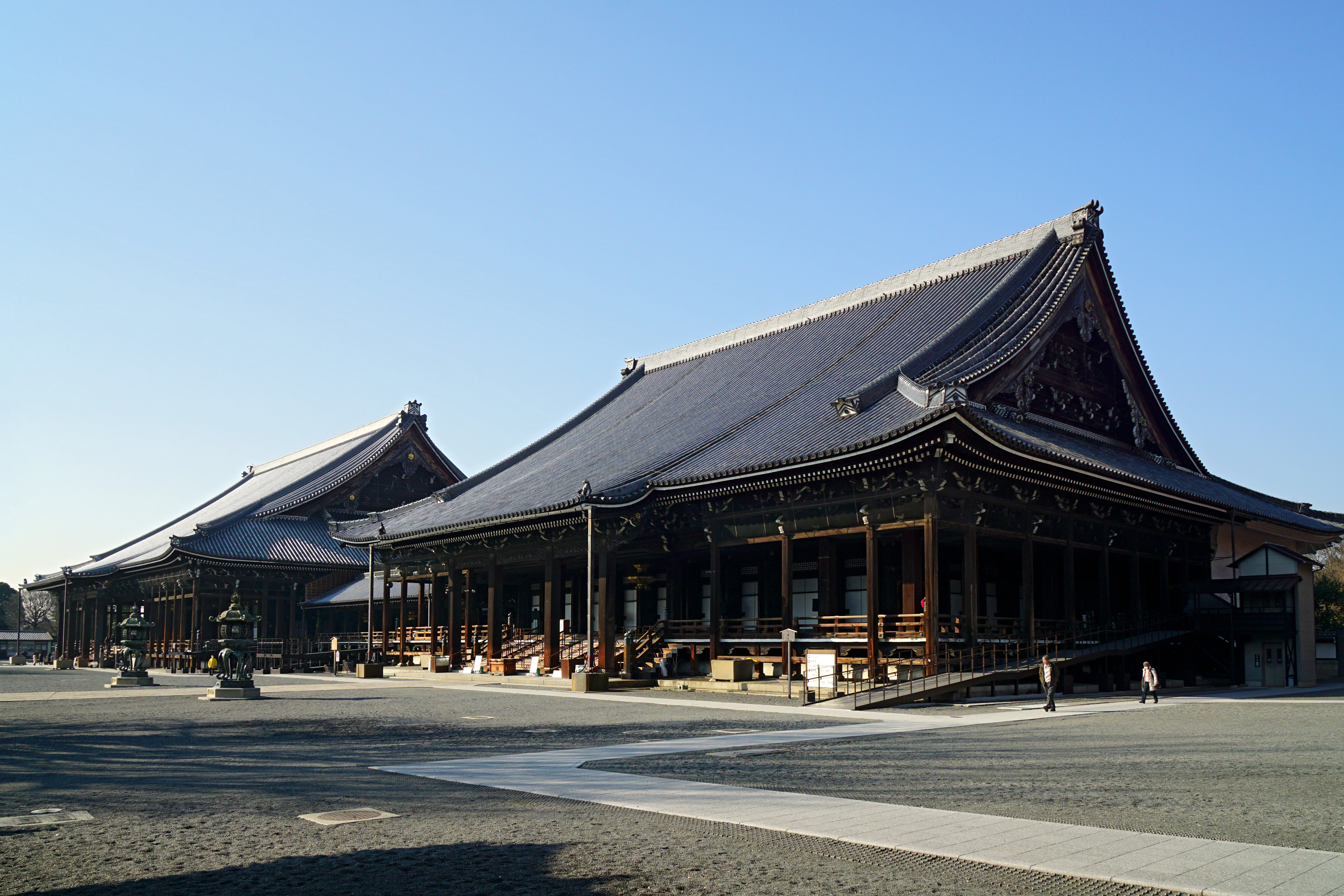
Nishi Hongan-ji, Kyoto

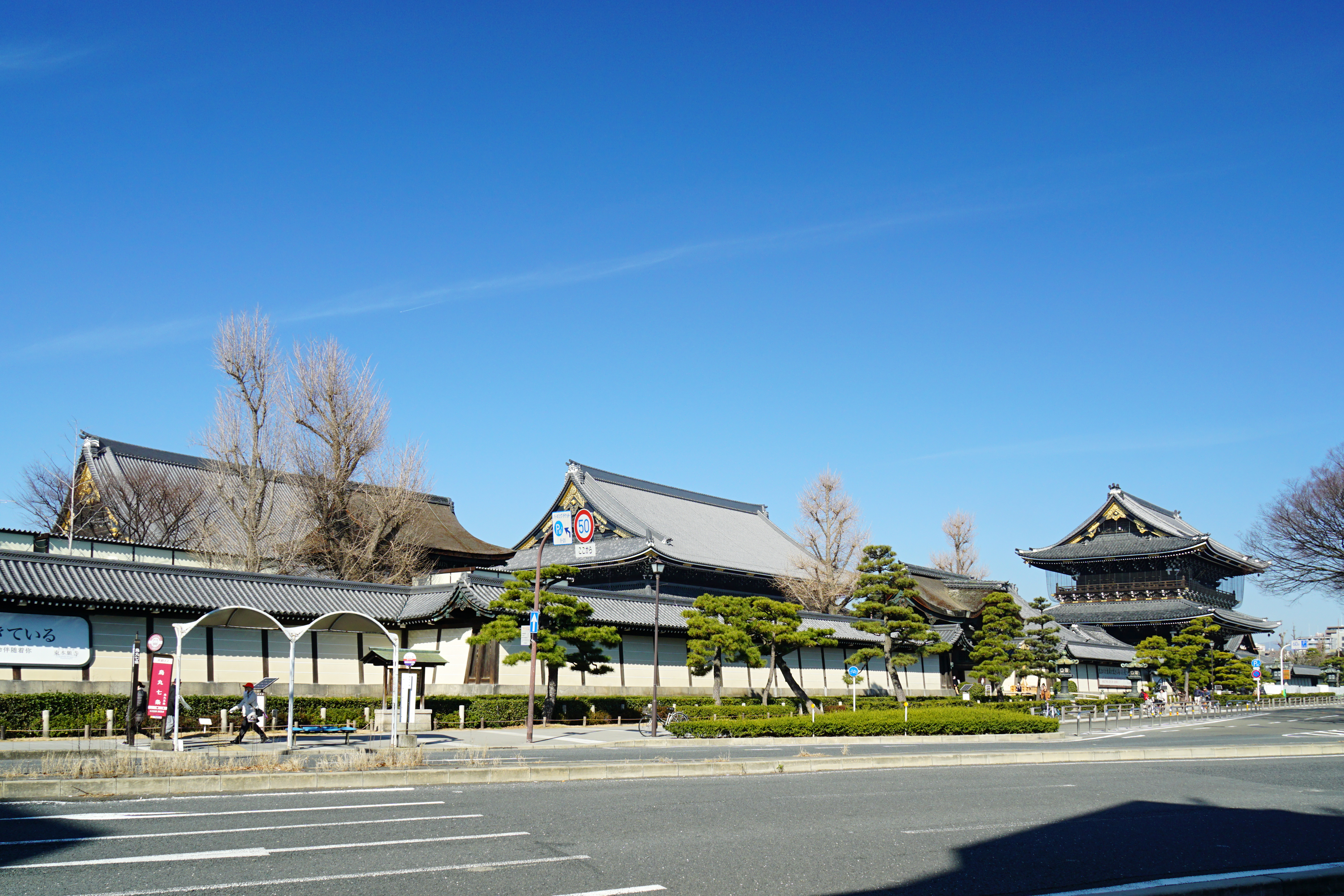
Higashi Hongan-ji, Kyoto

Hongan-ji (本願寺, Temple of the Primal Vow), also archaically romanized as Hongwan-ji, is the collective name of the largest school of the Jōdo Shinshū branch of Buddhism in Japan, which is subdivided into Nishi (Western) and Higashi (Eastern) branches. 'Hongan-ji' may also refer to any one of several actual temple buildings associated with the sect. Nishi Hongan-ji (西本願寺) and Higashi Hongan-ji (東本願寺) are two major temples in Kyoto.

== Early history ==
Hongan-ji was first established as a Buddhist temple in 1321 on the site of the mausoleum Higashi Otani, where Shinran, the founder of the Jōdo Shinshū school of Pure Land Buddhism was buried. Shinran's grandson Kakue, the son of his daughter Kakushinni, attended the mausoleum. Kakue's own son, Kakunyo, became the first chief priest of the Hongan-ji and third monshu (spiritual leader), and dedicated it to the worship of Amitābha (Amida). The Hongan-ji first gained power and importance in the 15th century, when Rennyo became its eighth monshu.

The Tendai sect of Mount Hiei, saw this expansion as a threat and attacked the Hongan-ji three times with its army of sōhei (warrior monks). Rennyo fled to Yoshizaki-gobō, where he established a new temple compound.

During the Sengoku period, fearing the power of the Hongan-ji sōhei, Oda Nobunaga attempted to destroy the Hongan-ji and its associated ikkō-ikki (allied armed league). For ten years, he laid siege to Ishiyama Hongan-ji in Osaka, one of the two primary temple-fortresses of the sect. In 1580, the abbot of Ishiyama, Kōsa, surrendered, although the fortress burnt to the ground. His son Kyōnyo refused to surrender, for which he was publicly disowned. Osaka Castle began construction on the burnt ruins of the Ishiyama site three years later.

After the death of Nobunaga in 1582 and the ascent of Toyotomi Hideyoshi, Abbot Kōsa was rewarded for his opposition to Shibata Katsuie by being granted land in Kyoto, now the site of the Nishi Hongan-ji, sometimes called the Honpa Hongan-ji (本派本願寺).

In February 1588, Tokugawa Ieyasu, head of the Tokugawa clan, ordered the seven Hongan-ji temples, which had been granted pardons for the construction of the Kyoto residence and the Great Buddha Hall of Hōkō-ji, to submit 5000 pieces of timber. However, the seven temples, already preoccupied with their own reconstruction efforts, refused, citing excessive taxes. Enraged, Ieyasu revoked the ban and ordered the temples to be expelled again. Subsequently, Hideyoshi's younger brother, Hidenaga Hashiba, persuaded Ieyasu, at the request of Shimoma Yorikan, to rescind the order. Ieyasu had to submit to the Toyotomi government's strong political intervention, which had been promoting reconciliation with the Hongan-ji sect.

Kōsa was succeeded by his legitimate son, Junnyo, as abbot in 1592. At the same time, Kyōnyo re-established a Hongan-ji site in Osaka in 1596. He had local support because of his refusal to surrender to Nobunaga earlier. After the death of Hideyoshi in 1598, Kyōnyo openly supported Tokugawa Ieyasu, who became shōgun in 1602. In reward for his loyalty, Kyōnyo was rewarded with land for a temple in Kyoto to the east of Nishi Honganji, which then became known in 1603 as Higashi Honganji (東本願寺 "Eastern Hongan-ji"). In 1619 the government recognized the two entities as separate congregations. It is popularly believed, however mistakenly, that the institution was split in two in order to maintain control of the order.

== Modern divisions of the Hongan-ji ==
=== Nishi Hongan-ji ===
Formally known as the Jodo-Shinshu Honganji-ha, it is the largest of all the Jodo Shinshu branches. Compared with the Higashi Hongan-ji, it has a history of institutional stability that accounts for high membership figures, and a larger geographical reach, but fewer well-known modern thinkers. The Nishi Hongan-ji has a sizable number of overseas temples in the United States, South America, Hawai'i, Canada, and Europe which are organized into several kyodan ("districts"). The largest of these is the Buddhist Churches of America.

The Hongwanji International Center, to the east of Nishi Hongan-ji, coordinates dialogue with Jōdo Shinshū organizations around the world and produces translation work.

The Nishi Hongan-ji operates the Hongwanji Publishing Company which produces books, music, films, and anime about Jōdo Shinshū Buddhism. They also publish a bimonthly newspaper, the Hongwanji Journal and their website includes, among other things, a TV channel devoted to explaining Buddhism and Hongan-ji's everyday operations.

=== Higashi Hongan-ji ===
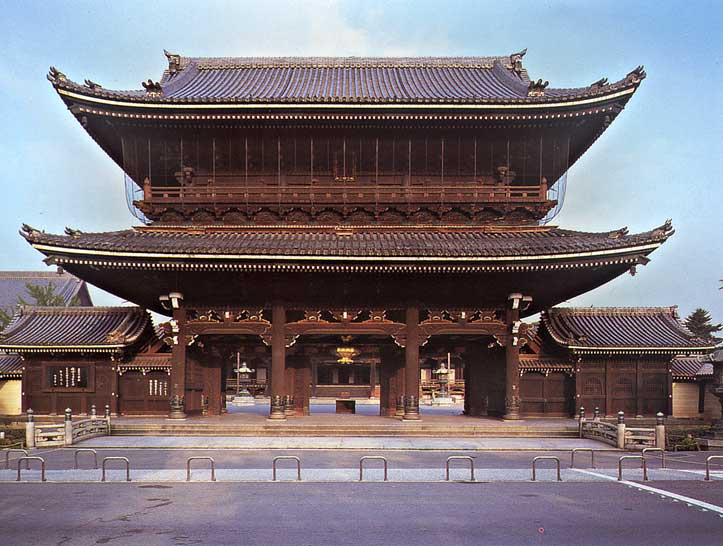
Higashi Honganji - Kaisando Gate (Goeidō Mon), built in 1911, 31 m (103 ft) x height 27 m (90 ft), 59,387 roof files

Higashi Hongan-ji is one of the two dominant subsects of Jōdo Shinshū, the other being the Nishi Honganji.

During the Meiji Restoration in the 1860s, the government set down new guidelines for the management of religious organizations. An organization called Ōtani-ha was put in control of Higashi Hongan-ji. In 1987, this temple was renamed Shinshū Honbyō "Shinshū Mausoleum", although the earlier name is still used. The buildings have not been changed or moved, and of course the historical cultural and religious significance of the place has not changed.

Due to opposition to the creation of the Ōtani-ha, and a number of other controversies and disputes such as the Ohigashi schism, several new Higashi Hongan-ji branches came into existence such as the Higashiyama Hongan-ji, founded in Kyoto in 1996 by Otani Korin, and the Tokyo Higashi Hongan-ji, whose current leader is Otani Koken. Despite, or perhaps even because of, this climate of instability, the Higashi Hongan-ji movement has also produced a significant number of controversial but influential thinkers, such as Soga Ryōjin, Kiyozawa Manshi, Kaneko Daiei and Akegarasu Haya, amongst others.

The largest Higashi Hongan-ji grouping, the Ōtani-ha has approximately 5.5 million members, according to statistics.

=== Joint activities ===
In recent years some members of the Honganji sects have been involved in high-profile protests against the visits of Japanese politicians to the controversial Yasukuni Shrine.

Along with the other non-Honganji Jōdo Shinshū subsects, the Honganji issued a statement opposing the 2003 invasion of Iraq.

== Important Hongan-ji buildings ==
=== Higashi Hongan-ji ===
The Shinshū Honbyō, the mausoleum of Shinran, is now owned by the Ōtani-ha but is still commonly called Higashi Hongan-ji (東本願寺) by Kyoto visitors and locals. The massive Goei-dō (also known as Mie-dō), or Founder's Hall Gate, is often one of the first things one sees walking north from JR Kyōto Station. Nearly identical to the Nishi Hongan-ji head temple in layout, it too features an Amida-dō, and a larger Mie-dō. The Mie-dō at Higashi Hongan-ji dates from 1895 and vies with a number of other structures for the claim of largest wooden building in the world.

A few blocks from the main grounds of the Higashi Hongan-ji is the Shosei-en garden, owned by the temple. Poet-scholar Ishikawa Jozan and landscape architect Kobori Masakazu are said to have contributed to its design in the 17th century.

=== Nishi Hongan-ji ===
The Nishi Honganji, like the Higashi Honganji, features a huge ), Kaisando and a smaller Amida-dō (阿弥陀堂) or Amitābha hall housing an image of Amitābha. Nishi Hongan-ji's Kura (倉), or storehouse, houses many National Treasures, most of which are not on view for the public. The shoin (書院), or study hall, is also quite famous; it is split into two sections, the shiro-shoin (白書院), or white study hall, and the kuro-shoin (黒書院), or black study hall.

Nishi Hongan-ji also contains a large shōgun complex from the medieval period, which was largely moved into the temple from elsewhere in Kyoto in the 16th century. This includes Hiunkaku (飛雲閣), a large tea pavilion, four Noh stages, one of which is thought to be the oldest in existence and the other being the largest outdoor Noh stage, and the Kokei no Niwa (虎渓の庭) garden.

Some medieval parts of Nishi Hongan-ji are now independent organizations: Ryukoku University and Kōshō-ji.

== See also ==
- List of Special Places of Scenic Beauty, Special Historic Sites and Special Natural Monuments
- Ikkō-shū
- Historic Monuments of Ancient Kyoto (Kyoto, Uji and Otsu Cities)
- Tsukiji Hongan-ji, Tokyo
- Ishiyama Hongan-ji, destroyed 1580, now the site of Osaka Castle
- Yamashina Hongan-ji
- Hongwanji Mission School

== Bibliography ==
- Ducor, Jérôme: Terre Pure, Zen et autorité : La Dispute de l'ère Jôô et la Réfutation du Mémorandum sur des contradictions de la foi par Ryônyo du Honganji, avec une traduction annotée du Ha Anjin-sôi-no-oboegaki (Collège de France, Bibliothèque de l'Institut des Hautes Etudes Japonaises); Paris, De Boccard, 2007 (ISBN 978-2-913217-18-8).
- Popular Buddhism In Japan: Shin Buddhist Religion & Culture by Esben Andreasen, p. 11 University of Hawaii Press 1998, ISBN 0-8248-2028-2
- Rogers, Minor L and Ann T. (1990). The Honganji: Guardian of the state (1868–1945), Japanese Journal of Religious Studies 17 (1), 3-28
