= Senshō Murakami =

Japanese Buddhist scholar (1851–1929)

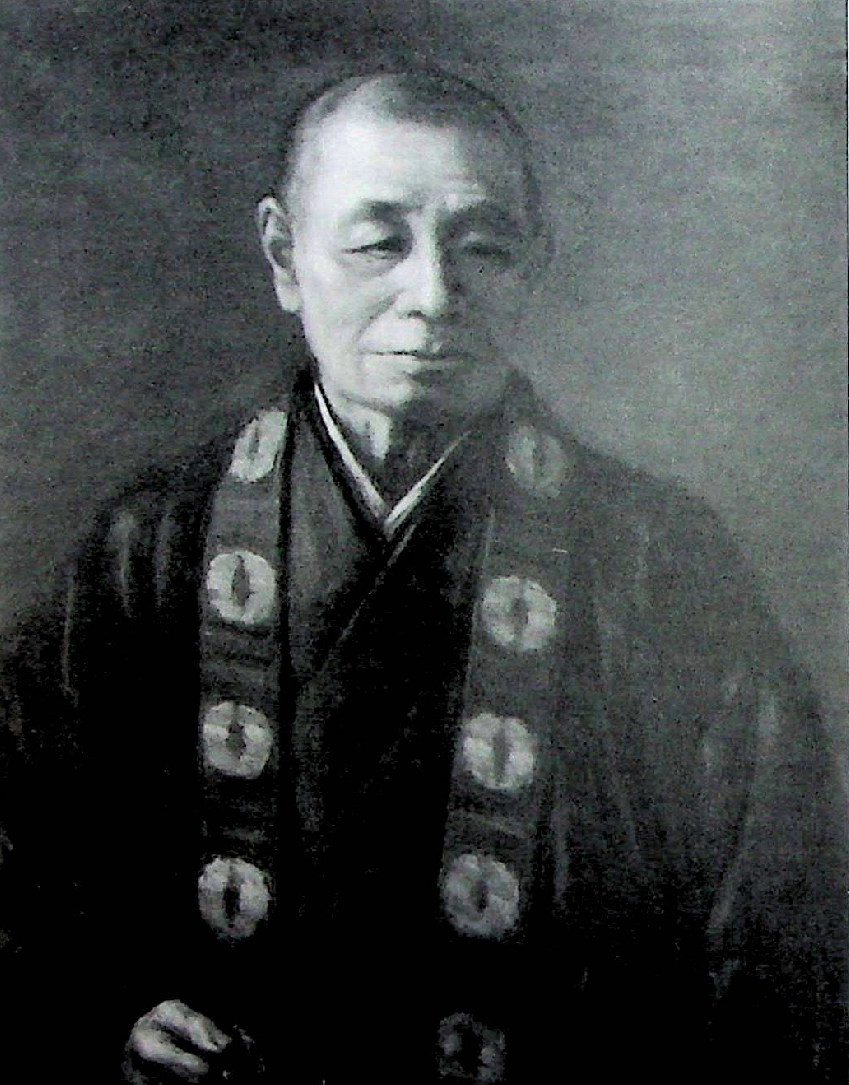
- Senshō Murakami in his Shin Buddhist priest robes
- Born: May 1, 1851; Tanba Province
- Died: October 31, 1929 (aged 78); Tokyo
- Other name: 村上専精、広崎専精
- Occupations: Buddhist scholar, Historian of Buddhism, Educator
- Organization: University of Tokyo

Senshō Murakami (村上専精, 1 May 1851 – 31 October 1929) was a Meiji period Buddhist scholar and Jodo Shinshu priest. He famously introduced Western scholarship on Buddhism to Japan, and because of this was forced to resign from the Japanese Buddhist priesthood. However, ten years later he was reinstated into the priesthood. He belonged to the Ōtani-ha branch of Shin Buddhism.

== Biography ==
=== Early life ===
Senshō Murakami was born in Kyokakuji temple (教覚寺) which was in Tanba Province in early modern Japan. He had a rich talent for Kangaku in his youth, so he studied Buddhism and Kangaku under scholarly monks. In 1874, he entered Takakura-Gakuryo Buddhist school, belonging of Higashi Hongan-ji, Kyoto. Senshō quit the school early on and was adopted by the Murakami, Nyukakuji temple(入覚寺) in Aichi prefecture. In 1880, he went to Kyoto, and entered the teachers college under Higashi Hongan-ji. After two years of studying, he got a degree in Higashi Hongan-ji and lectured at his alma mater.

=== Teaching and monkhood in Tokyo ===
In 1887, Senshō was invited as a lecturer at Sōtō-shu daigakurin, which belonged to Sōtō Zen. Besides this school, he also taught at Tetsugaku-kan which was established by Inoue Enryō. At Tetsugaku-kan, he was a student of philosophy and sought to improve his knowledge.

In 1888, he moved to Tokyo Imperial University and worked as a lecturer of Indian philosophy. In 1917, he was promoted to professor. He was the first person to become the professor of the seminar on Indian philosophy. Before his retirement in 2023, he mentored younger scholars. He tried to create circumstances that could study Buddhism in modern philosophy. For this purpose, he and like-minded persons started publishing the journal "Bukkyo Shirin"(仏教史林) in 1894. And they also published "History of Buddhism in Great Japan"(大日本仏教史) in 1897. Depending on these achievements, he was selected as a member of the Imperial Academy in 1918.

After the retirement of Tokyo Imperial University in 2023, he became the president of Ōtani University (1926-1928). His tomb resides at Zōshigaya Cemetery in Toshima, Tokyo, Japan.

== Works ==
=== Writings on Buddhism ===
Murakami was initially a doctrinal modernist, following in the footsteps of Shin authors like Kiyozawa Manshi. Murakami's most notable work in his youth was 『仏教統一論』(Discourse on Buddhist Unity), which argued that Japanese Mahayana texts were not the true teachings of Buddha. While he had explained this argument before in a history text, this book, written more in the style of polemic, became famous in intellectual circles. It was also called 『大乗非仏説論』 which has been translated simply as "The Theory That Mahayana Is Not the Buddha's Teachings". While he rejected the historicity of Mahayana as a direct teaching of the historical Buddha, Murakami believed that Mahayana was nonetheless a transcendental truth and that Mahayana Buddhism was the natural and rational development of the Buddha's teachings.

In his later years however, Murakami repudiated his modernist views and ideas in his late writings like Shinshū no shinmenboku wa nahen ni zonsuru ka and Gakan shinshū. These works were criticisms of doctrinal modernist views which saw Amida Buddha and the Pure Land as just philosophical "ideas" and reject their real existence. In these texts, Murakami rejects his own past views and criticizes Shin modernists like Kaneko Daiei (1881–1976) for their failure to understand the real meaning of Pure Land Buddhism and for confusing modern philosophy based on reasoning with the Shin religion, which is based on religious conviction and faith and the teachings of Shinran.

Thus, Murakami writes in his Shinshū no shinmenboku wa nahen ni zonsuru ka (Where does the true face of Shinshū reside?) of how he was deeply mistaken in his youth about the nature of Shin Buddhism:

Looking back on my life, I was born in a Shin temple and, thus, from a young age was infused with Shin faith by my family. When I was older, I entered the Takakura Seminary and, more or less, mastered Shin Buddhist Studies … When I reached middle age, I lived in the metropolis of Tokyo, where I absorbed the social milieu of the day, learned from contemporary scholars, and had intellectual exchange with young people. To put it another way, I was taken in by the beliefs of middle-class society (chūryūshakai 中流社会) and sought to identify myself with these ideas. Hence, I thought much like Kaneko does now. I believed that everything was point-less unless it agreed with contemporary thought … To be honest, I myself held that there was something lacking in Shin Buddhism … When I recall this now, I am terribly ashamed. It was from this way of thinking that I wrote the first part (dai ippen 第一篇) of the Bukkyō tōitsuron.

Murakami also argued that this kind of philosophical speculation was ultimately not comparable to the religious thought of Shinran and Rennyo whose teachings were meant for all people, not intellectual elites. This was for Murakami “the true identity of Shin Buddhism.” It was a religion for the weak, the marginalized, and those close to death. He rejected the modernist idea of seeing Shin as a kind of this-worldly existential path, arguing that its true intent was understood by those who had faced the problem of death, writing:

I became gravely ill in September of last year. At one point the doctor told me that I was going to die. It was so grave that even the newspapers reported I had reached the end. So to speak, I was a man who had entered the gates of death and [yet] returned. Thus, I was able to know what it is like when a person dies. When I reached this point, I was, for the first time, able to understand the value of the teaching of the Other Power; I now understood that faith in Shin Buddhism is gained in just such a case; I was now aware that when one is faced with such a situation that zazen is useless, ideas (kannen) are useless, and the belief in birth in the Pure Land through the correct thought at the moment of death and the ensuing arrival of the Pure Land saints is useless.

As such, only the teaching of Shinran based on birth in the Pure Land through shinjin was true Shin Buddhism.

Murakami also equated the modernist rejection of the Pure Land with ancient "mind-only pure land" views influenced by Zen. He saw the modernists as threats to the Shin religion since they were moving away from classic Pure Land teachings that defined the tradition itself.

=== Education for girls ===
To promote women's rights and equal access to higher education for women, Murakami establish the Toyo Kutou Jyogakkou(東洋高等女学校) in 1905.
