= Nishi Hongan-ji =

Buddhist temple in Shimogyō, Kyoto, Japan

Nishi Hongan-ji 西本願寺
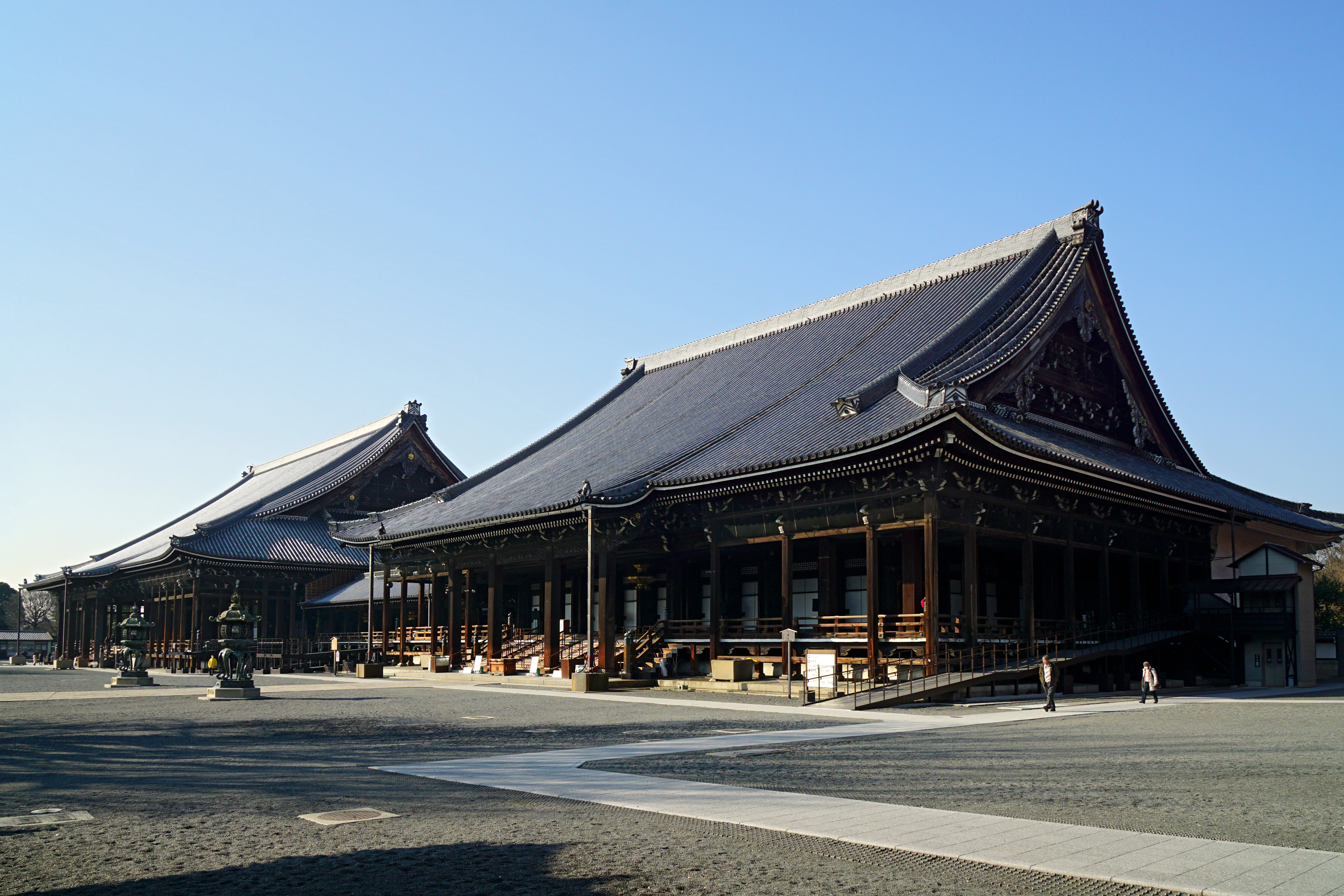
- Amidadō and Goeidō (National Treasures)

Religion
- Affiliation: Jōdo Shinshū Honganji-ha
- Deity: Amitābha (Amida)
- Status: Head temple

Location
- Location: 60 Monzen-machi, Horikawa-dōri Hanaya-chō Kudaru, Shimogyō-ku, Kyoto, Kyoto Prefecture
- Country: Japan
- Interactive map of Nishi Hongan-ji 西本願寺
- Coordinates: 34°59′31.37″N 135°45′5.8″E

Architecture
- Founder: Honganji Kennyo
- Completed: 1591

Website
- http://www.hongwanji.or.jp/english/

Nishi Hongan-ji (西本願寺) is a Buddhist temple in Shimogyō-ku, Kyoto, Japan. It serves as the head temple of the Jodo Shinshu Hongwanji-ha subsect. It is one of two Jōdo Shinshū temple complexes in Kyoto, the other being Higashi Hongan-ji, which is the head temple of the Ōtani-ha subsect.

Established in its current location in 1591, the temple's origin dates back to the 14th century. Many of its building have survived from the Azuchi–Momoyama and early Edo periods, making it a great example of Japanese architecture from the 17th and 18th centuries. A total of seven Nishi Hongan-ji structures have been designated National Treasures in three different categories: the karamon, Goei-dō and Amida halls (temple buildings), the Flying Cloud Pavilion, shoin and the Black study hall, including the Denrō gallery (residences) and the north Noh stage (miscellaneous structure).

Nishi Hongan-ji was designated a World Heritage Site in 1994 as part of the Historic Monuments of Ancient Kyoto.

== History ==
The original Hongan-ji was established as a temple in 1321, on the site of the Ōtani Mausoleum, where Shinran, the founder of the Jōdo Shinshū ("True Pure Land") was buried. The mausoleum was attended by Shinran's grandson (through his daughter Kakushinni), Kakue. Kakue's own son, Kakunyo, became the first chief priest of the Hongan-ji and third monshu (spiritual leader), and dedicated it to the worship of Amitābha (Amida). The Hongan-ji first gained power and importance in the 15th century, when Rennyo became its eighth monshu. However, the Tendai based on Mount Hiei saw this expansion as a threat and attacked the Hongan-ji three times with their army of sōhei. Rennyo fled to Yoshizaki-gobō, where he established a new temple compound.

During the Sengoku period, fearing the power of the monks of the Hongan-ji, Oda Nobunaga tried to destroy it. For ten years, he laid siege to the Ishiyama Hongan-ji in Osaka, one of the two primary temple fortresses of the sect. In 1580, the abbot of the Ishiyama Hongan-ji, Kennyo, surrendered, while his son Kyōnyo refused to surrender, for which he was publicly disowned.

After the death of Nobunaga in 1582 and the ascent of Toyotomi Hideyoshi, Kennyo was rewarded for his surrender to Nobunaga by being granted land in Kyoto, at the site of modern-day Nishi Hongan-ji (西本願寺, "Western Hongan-ji"; sometimes called the Honpa Hongan-ji 本派本願寺). He was succeeded by his legitimate son, Junnyo, as abbot in 1592. While his brother Kyōnyo re-established the Osaka Hongan-ji in 1596 with local support, owing to his refusal to surrender to Nobunaga earlier. After the death of Hideyoshi in 1598, Kyōnyo openly supported Tokugawa Ieyasu, who became shōgun in 1602. In reward for his loyalty, Kyōnyo was rewarded with land for a temple in Kyoto to the east of Nishi Honganji, which then became known in 1603 as Higashi Honganji (東本願寺 "Eastern Hongan-ji"). In 1619 the government recognized the two entities as separate congregations. It is popularly believed, however mistakenly, that the institution was split in two in order to maintain control of the order.

In 1994 Nishi Hongan-ji was listed as a UNESCO World Heritage Site as one of the Historic Monuments of Ancient Kyoto.

== Architecture ==
Nishi Hongan-ji occupies almost an entire rectangular area bounded by Hanayachō-dōri (Hanayachō Street) to the north, Horikawa-dōri (Horikawa Street) to the east,^{A} Shichijō-dōri (Shichijō Street) to the south, and Ōmiya-dōri (Omiya Street) to the west. The main entrance to Nishi Hongan-ji is to the east on Horikawa-dōri. As the name of the temple implies, it is located to the west of Higashi Hongan-ji. Nishi Hongan-ji is older than the latter and has a more integral architecture.

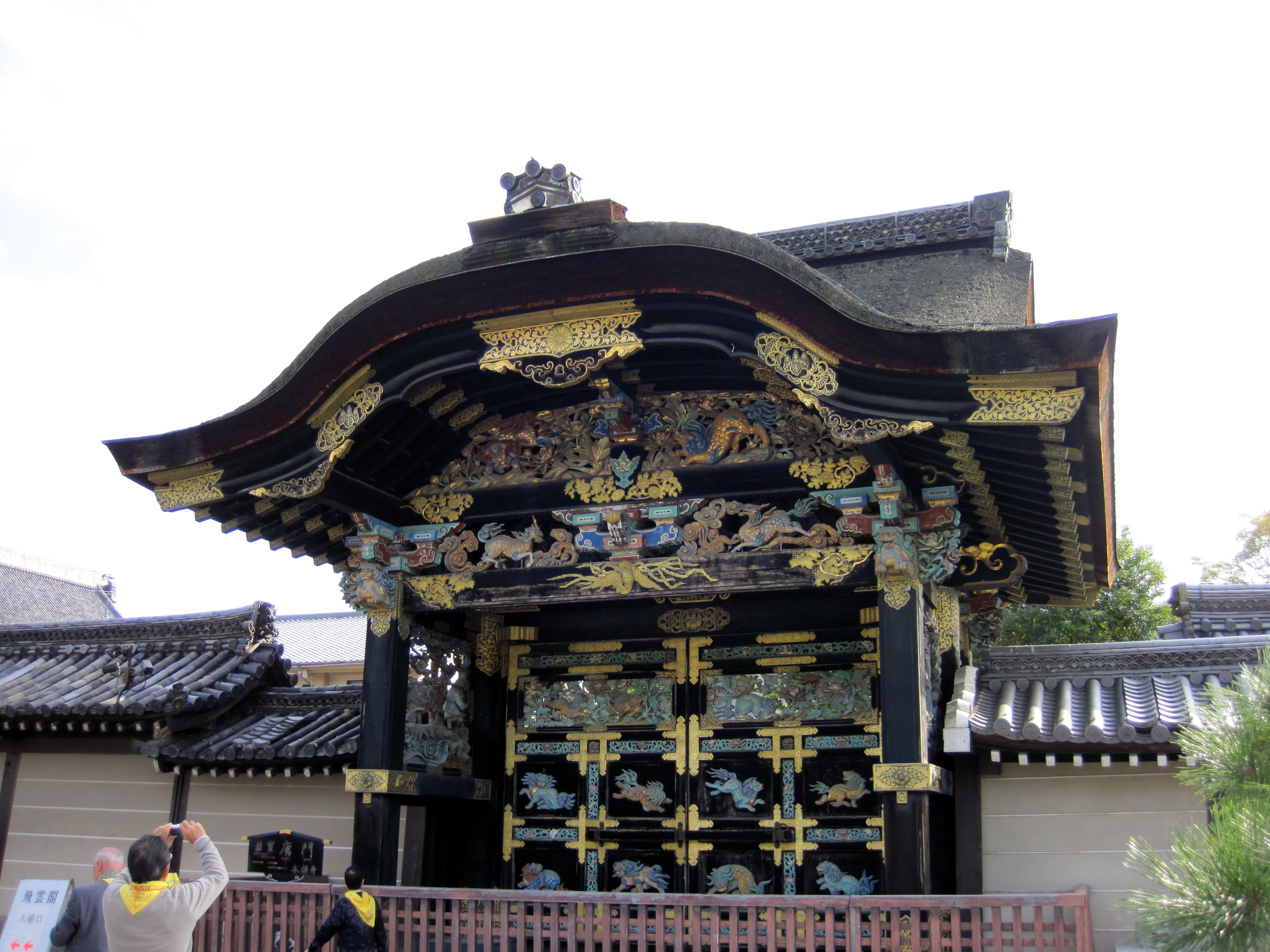
Karamon (National Treasure)

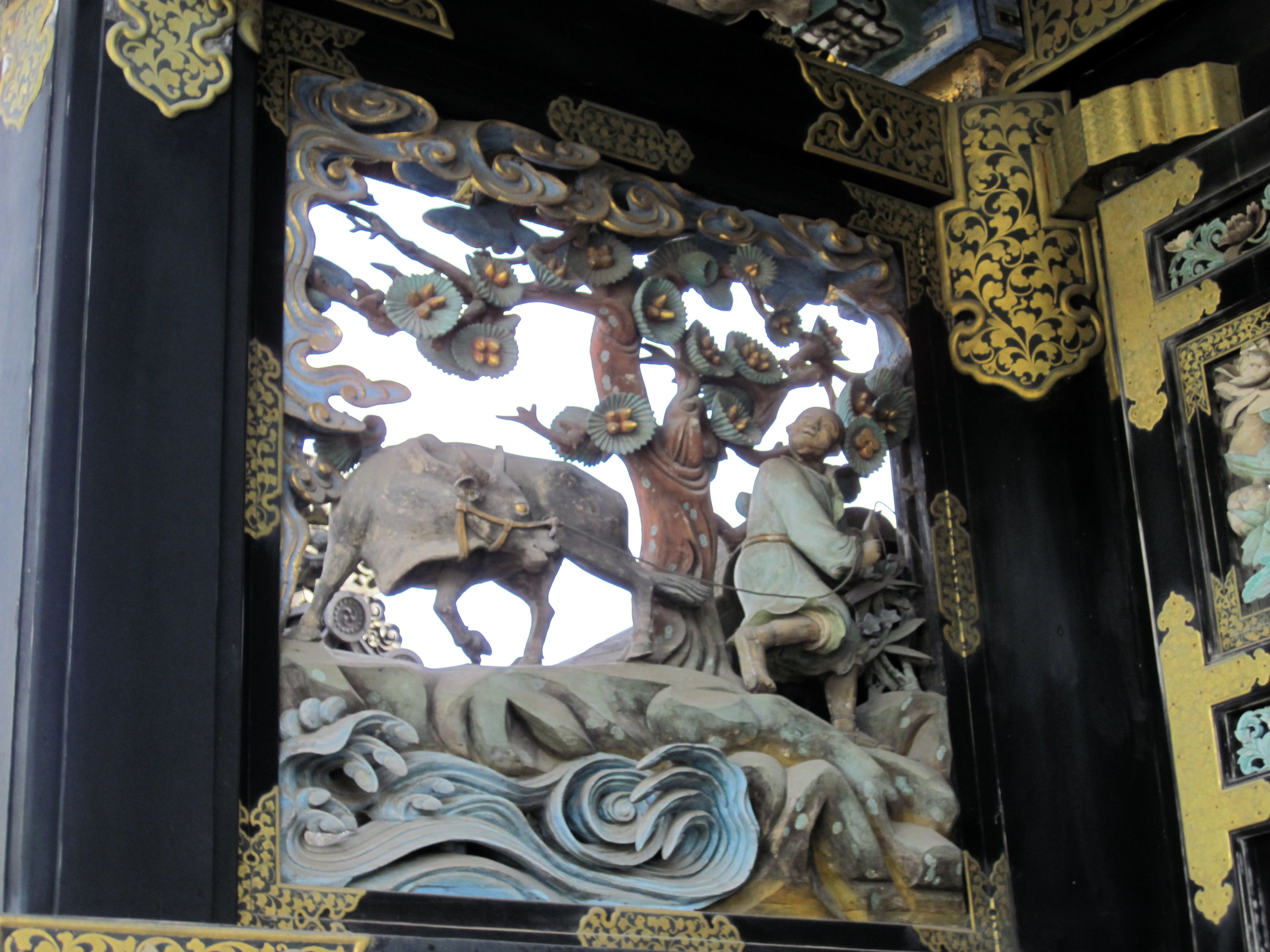
Chao Fu leading his ox away from the water tainted by Xu You washing his ears

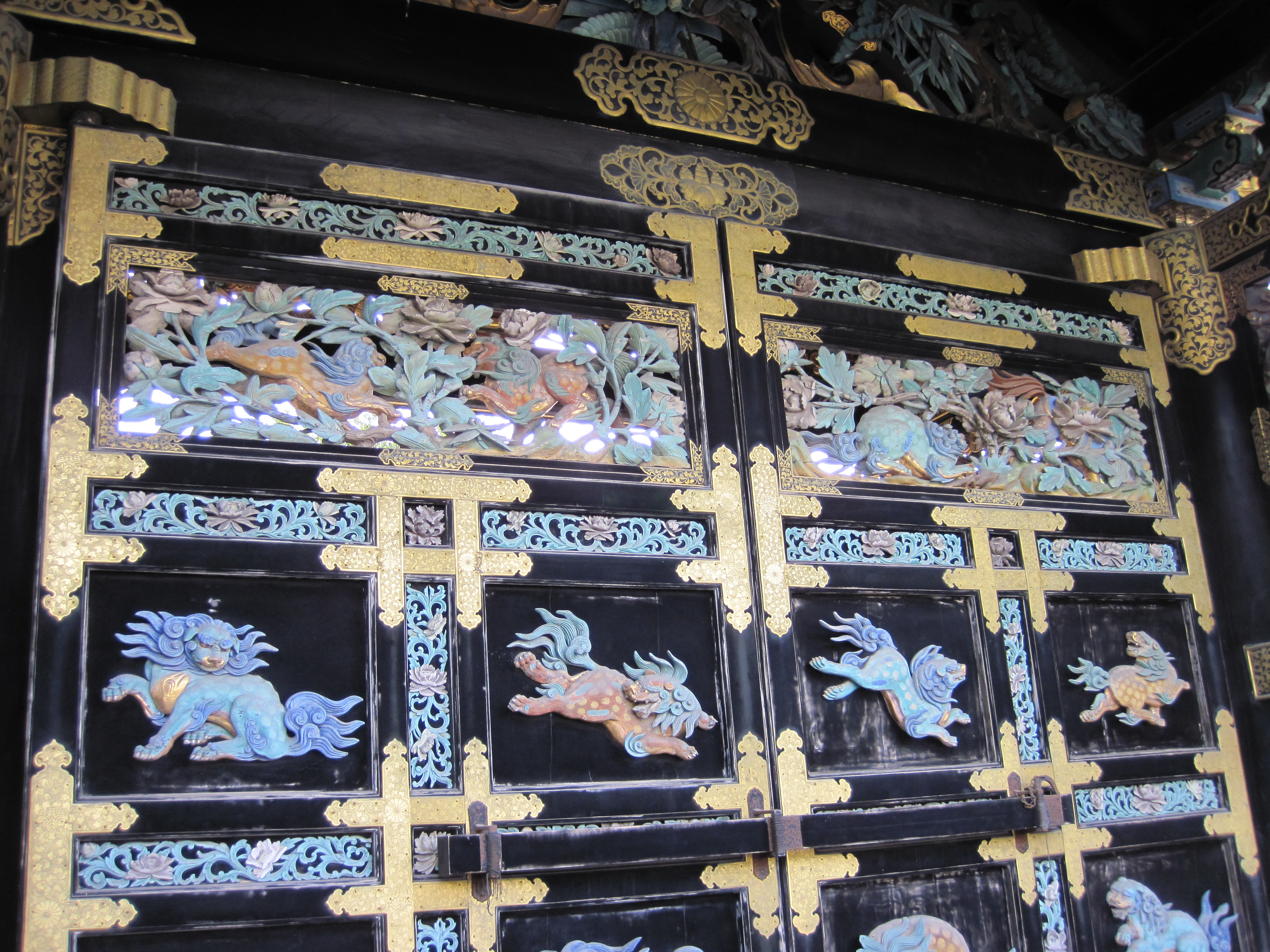
Detail of the door, front view

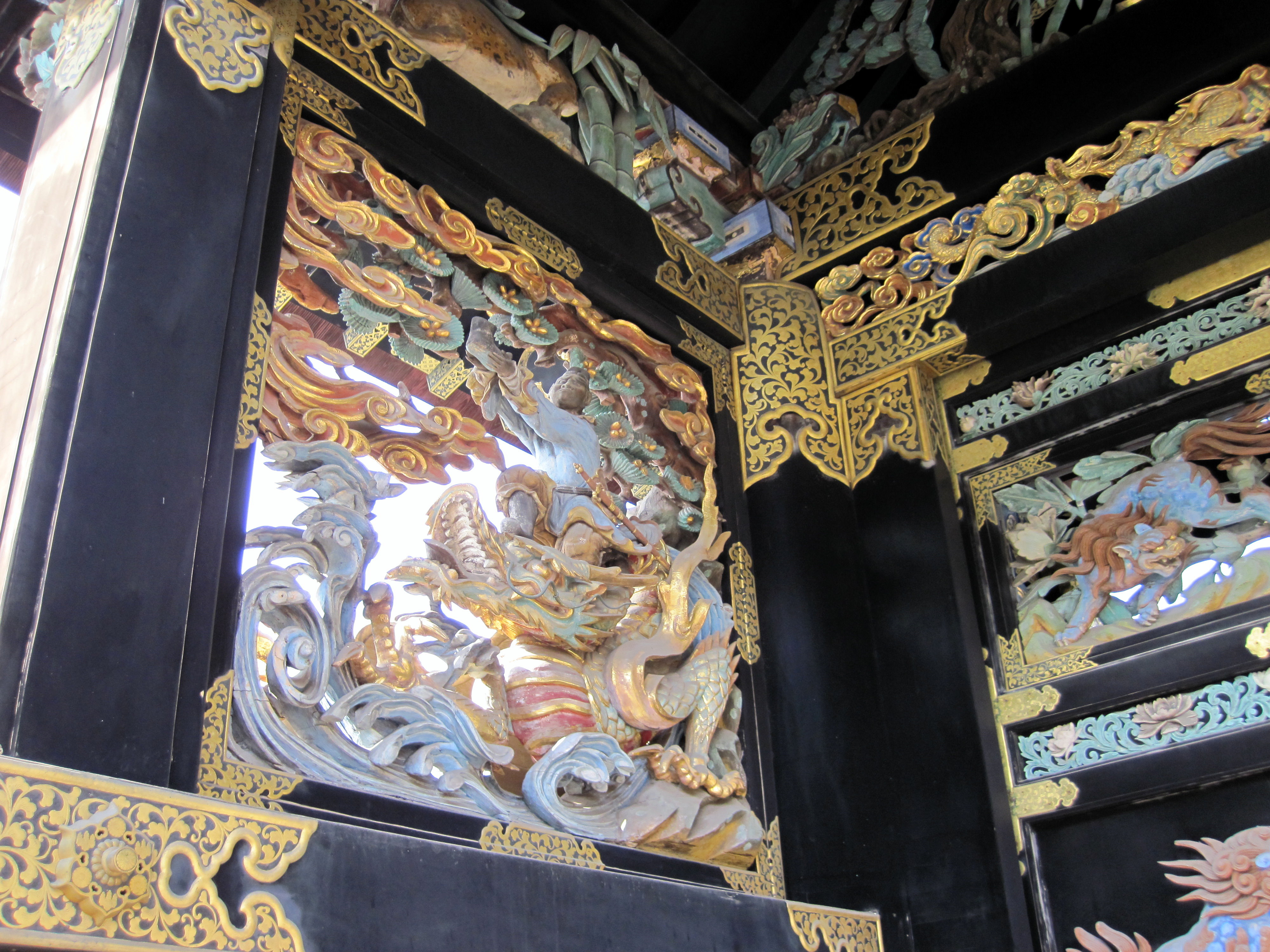
Carving of a Chinese dragon

=== Karamon ===
The karamon (唐門) gate of Nishi Hongan-ji was originally built for Toyotomi Hideyoshi's Fushimi castle, probably around 1598. After the castle was dismantled in 1623, it was moved to Nishi Hongan-ji in 1632 for a planned visit of Tokugawa Iemitsu to the temple. It was last renovated in 2018–2021. It is designated a National Treasure, one of six such a structures to hold this distinction.

It is constructed as a four-legged gate with karahafu gables of undulating curves on the front and back. It has a roof in the irimoya style, a style of hip roof sloping down on all four sides and integrated on two opposing sides with a gable. The roof is covered by bark shingles made from hinoki cypress.

It is also known as the Higurashi no Mon ("all day gate"), due to the high number and quality of the carving that decorate the gate, including images of flowers, animals and fantastic figures. One of the panels shows the legendary Chinese hermit Xu You beside a waterfall, "washing from his ear an offensive proposal from the Emperor Yao". Another one shows a farmer cleaning his ox, "expressing anger at the pollution of the stream".

The last two times the gate was opened and visitors were allowed to walk through it were in 1983, during a rite related to the founder of Jōdo Shinshū Buddhism Shinran, and in 2017, prior to the renovation of the gate in 2018. It is also used for occasional visits of the Imperial Family.

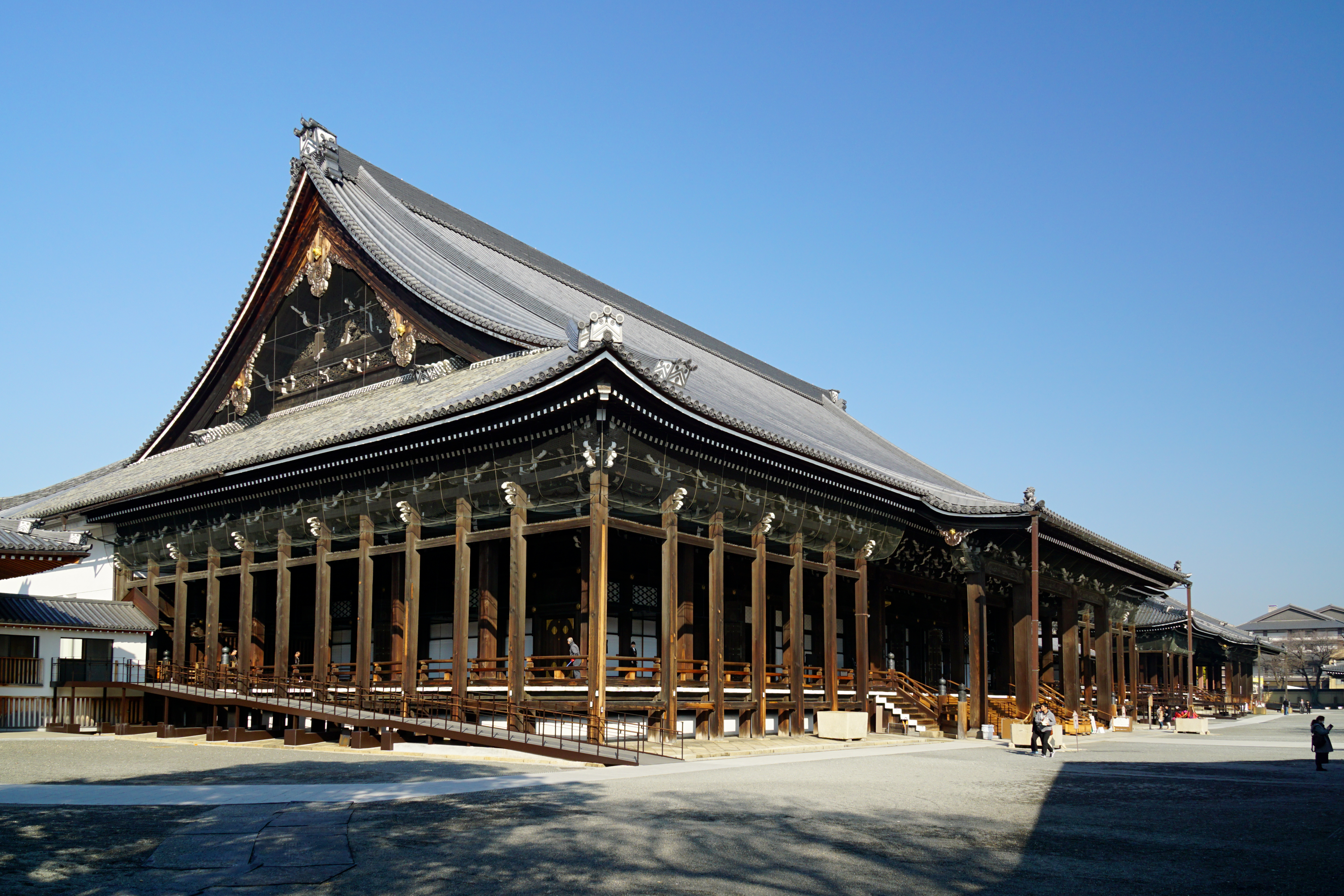
Goeidō (National Treasure)

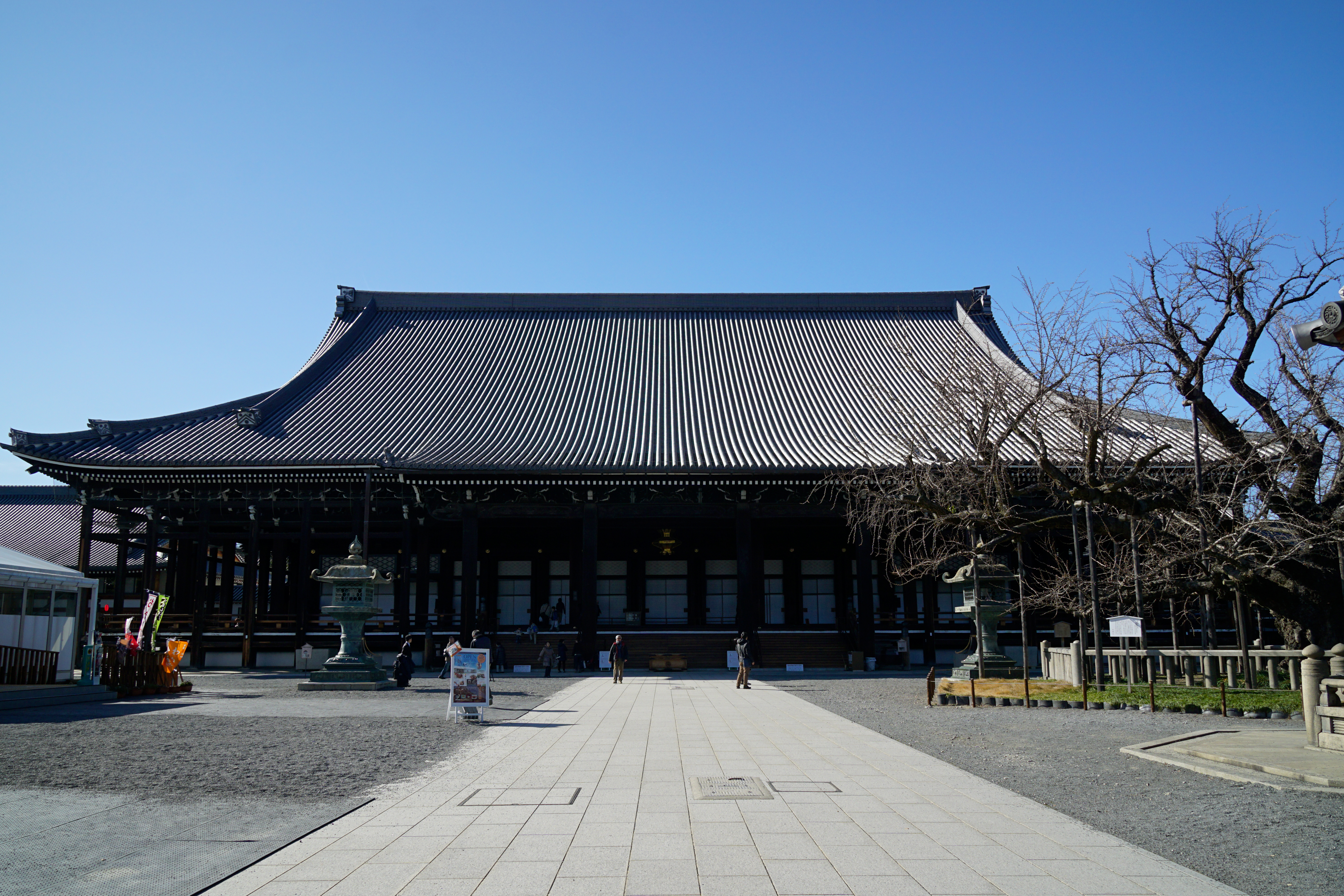
Front view of the Goeidō

A four-fifths replica was created for the Japan-British exhibition held in London in 1910. After the exhibition closed, the replica was reconstructed in Kew Gardens where it is the centrepiece of the Japanese garden.

=== Goeidō ===
The goeidō (御影堂) or "Founder's Hall" was rebuilt in 1636, following the destruction of the previous main halls by an earthquake in 1596 and a fire in 1617. It was designated a National Treasure in 2014.

The building, single-storied, with a hongawarabuki roof, a tile roof composed of flat broad concave tiles and semi-cylindrical convex tiles covering the seams of the former, in the irimoya style. It measures 62 by 48 metres, with a height on 29 metres.

A wooden image of Shinran is enshrined in the central altar, with portraits of the successive head priests (monshu) on display alongside. Major ceremonies conducted at Nishi Hongan-ji are usually conducted at this building.

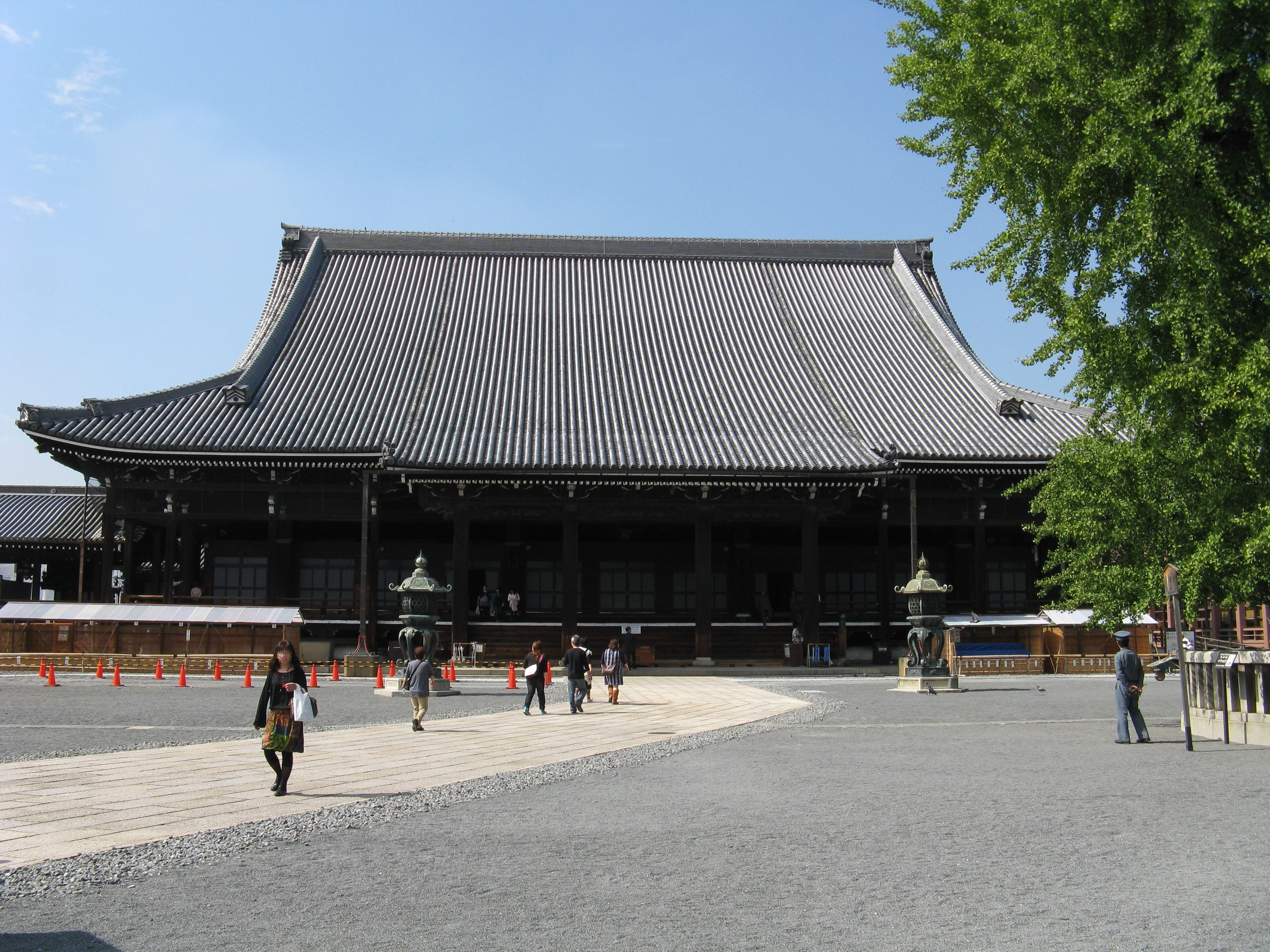
Amidadō (National Treasure)

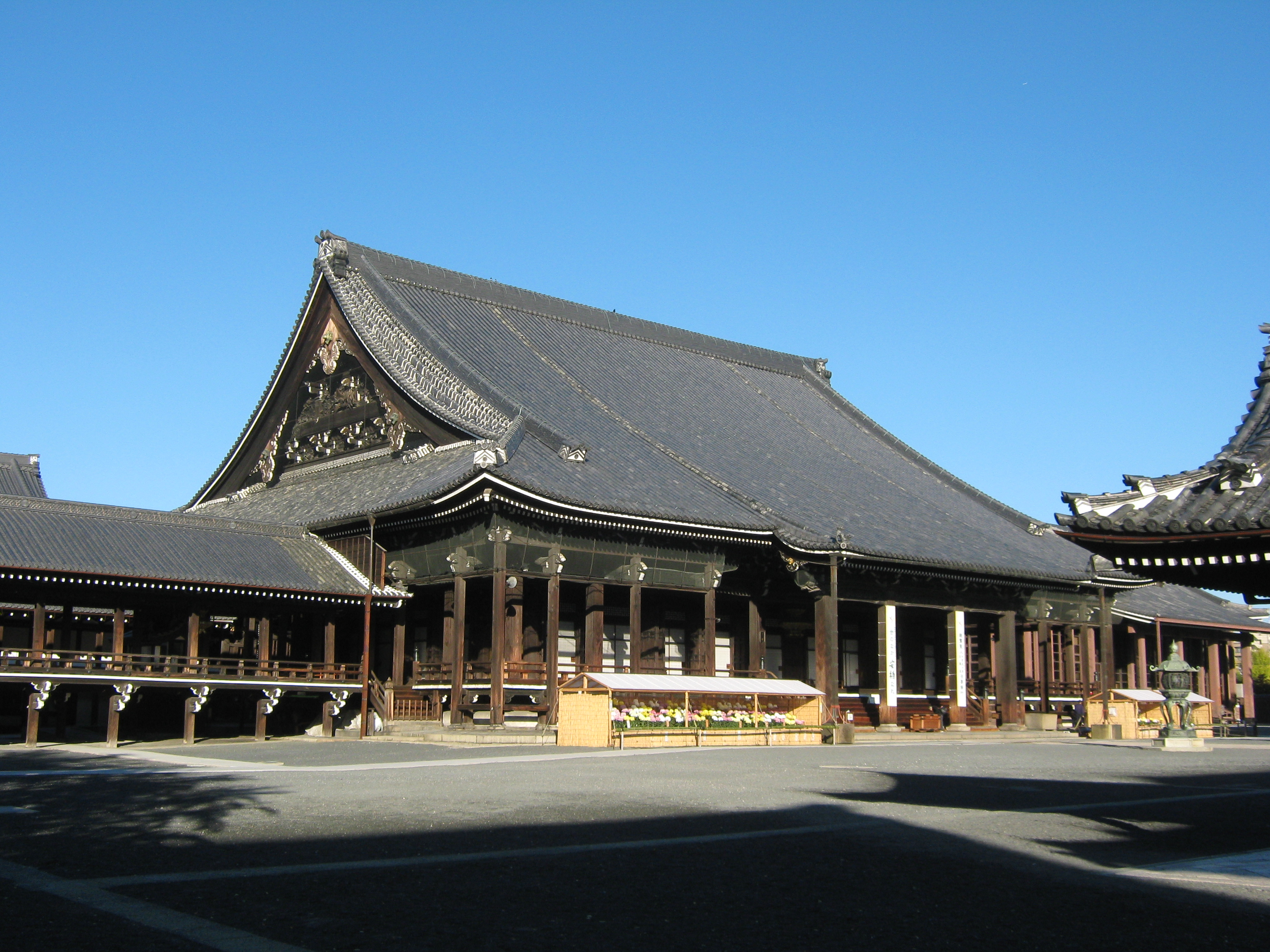
Lateral view of the Amidadō and the corridor leading to the Goeidō

=== Amidadō ===
The amidadō (阿弥陀堂) or "Amida Hall" was rebuilt in 1760 as the temple's main worship hall. It was designated a National Treasure in 2014.

It is a single-storied building with a hongawarabuki roof in the irimoya style, measuring 45 by 42 metres (148 by 138 ft), with a height of 25 metres (82 ft). It houses a sculpture of Amida Buddha surrounded by the portraits of six of the seven Pure Land Masters in the central altar, and images of Shinran's master Honen and Prince Shotoku.

Due to renovations, the interior of the Amidadō was not accessible to the public until February 2019, when the front half of the hall was opened. The back half was closed until the end of March 2022, when the restoration work concluded.

== See also ==
- Glossary of Japanese Buddhism
- List of National Treasures of Japan (miscellaneous structures)
- List of National Treasures of Japan (residences)
- List of National Treasures of Japan (paintings)
- List of National Treasures of Japan (writings)

== Footnotes ==
A.The defunct hanamachi courtesan's district of Shimabara is located directly to the west of the north side of Nishi Hongan-ji along Hanayachō-dōri.

== Bibliography ==
- Kirby, John B. (1962). From Castle to Teahouse: Japanese Architecture of the Momoyama Period. Tokyo: Tuttle Publishing. OCLC 512972
- Rogers, Minor L and Ann T. (1990). The Honganji: Guardian of the state (1868–1945), Japanese Journal of Religious Studies 17 (1), 3-28
- Alicia, Matsunaga (1993). Foundation of Japanese Buddhism. Vol. II, The mass movement (Kamakura & Muromachi periods). Buddhist Books International. OCLC 137242947
