= Buddhist Temple of Chicago =

Coordinates: 41.967277°N 87.658430°W

Religion
- Affiliation: Independent with informal ties to Higashi Honganji branch of Jōdo Shinshū

Location
- Location: 1151 West Leland Avenue, Chicago, Illinois 60640
- Country: United States
- Interactive map of Buddhist Temple of Chicago

Architecture
- Founder: Gyomay Kubose
- Completed: 2006

Website
- www.budtempchi.org

The Buddhist Temple of Chicago (BTC) was founded in October 1944 by Gyomay Kubose, a minister of the Higashi Honganji branch of the Jōdo Shinshū ("True Pure Land School") sect, along with several laypeople who had been released from the Japanese American internment camps. Although the temple is administratively independent, the teaching lineage reflects the progressive Jōdo Shinshū thought of Manshi Kiyozawa and his student, Haya Akegarasu, who was Kubose's teacher.

The temple was originally called the Chicago Buddhist Church and was located in the Hyde Park neighborhood on Chicago's south side. In the mid-1950s, the temple relocated to the Uptown neighborhood on the north side.

In 2006, the temple dedicated its new building.

The membership base continues to be Japanese American, but from early on in the temple's history the number of non-Japanese members has steadily increased. Today the active membership includes a diverse congregation of Asian, European, Latino and African members. The temple also accepts those who identify as LGBTQA+.

== See also ==
- Buddhism in the West
- Buddhism in the United States
- Japanese in Chicago
- Glossary of Japanese Buddhism
