= Chicago temple =

A Chicago temple may refer to:

- BAPS Shri Swaminarayan Mandir Chicago, is a Hindu place of worship of the denomination of the Swaminarayan branch of Hinduism.
- Baháʼí House of Worship (Wilmette, Illinois), in a suburb of Chicago, the second Baháʼí House of Worship ever constructed and the oldest one still standing.
- Buddhist Temple of Chicago, was founded in October 1944 of the Jōdo Shinshū ("True Pure Land School") of Higashi Hongan-ji ("Shin Buddhism") by those that had been released from Japanese-American internment camps.
- Chicago Illinois Temple, the thirty-fifth temple of the Church of Jesus Christ of Latter-day Saints.
- First United Methodist Church of Chicago, a church located at the base and utmost floors of the Chicago Temple Building.
- Masonic Temple (Chicago) which was a skyscraper built in Chicago, Illinois in 1892, and from 1895 to the 1920s the tallest building in Chicago.
- Medinah Temple, built by Shriners architects Huehl and Schmidt on the Near North Side of Chicago, in 1912, as an example of Moorish Revival architecture.

See also Category:Churches in Chicago, Category:Synagogues in Chicago, and generally Category:Religious buildings and structures in Chicago
