= Ziyuan =

Ziyuan may refer to:

- Ziyuan (字苑), or Essays on Chinese Characters, Chinese dictionary attributed to the Eastern Jin Dynasty scholar Ge Hong
- Ziyuan County (资源县), Guilin, Guangxi, China
  - Ziyuan Town (资源镇), town in and county seat of Ziyuan County
- Ziyuan (satellite), a series of Chinese satellites
- Ziyuan (子遠), style name of Xu You
