= Gyomay Kubose =

Japanese-American Buddhist teacher (1905–2000)

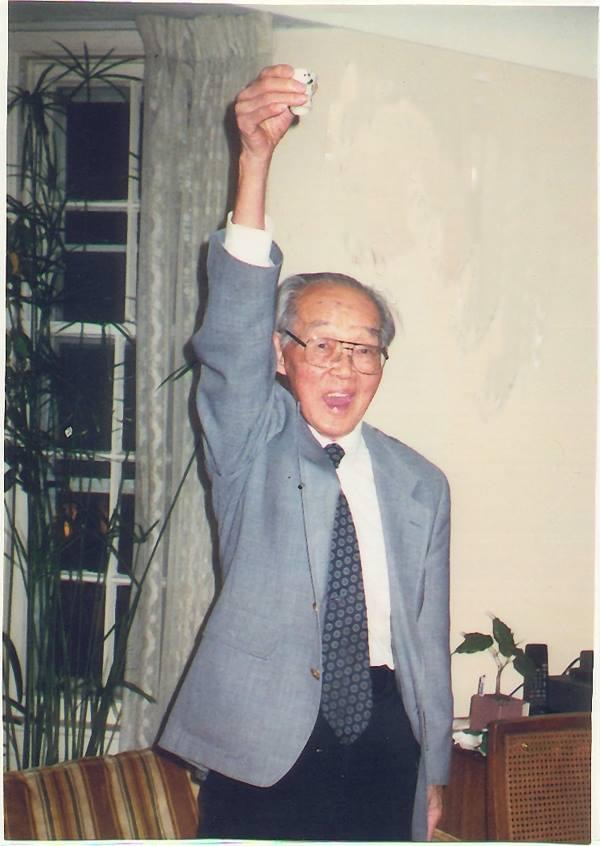
Gyomay Kubose

Gyomay Kubose (久保瀬 暁明; June 21, 1905–March 29, 2000), born Masao Kubose was a Japanese-American Buddhist teacher. In 1944, after leaving the Heart Mountain internment camp, he founded the Chicago Buddhist Church, later renamed the Buddhist Temple of Chicago.

== Early life ==
Although born in the United States, he spent a large amount of his youth in Japan. After graduating from University of California at Berkeley, Kubose moved back to Japan where, for five years, he studied under his spiritual instructor Haya Akegarasu, who was in turn a student of Kiyozawa Manshi, a Meiji-era reformer of Shin Buddhism.

== Buddhist Ideas ==
Kubose was a non-sectarian Buddhist and followed Kiyozawa's message that Buddhism should be implemented as a personal voyage, and not merely a communal tradition as it had become prior to the Meiji era. He also extended a great amount of influence in North America, and traveled much of the United States on his lecture tours. In addition to founding one of the first non-sectarian Buddhist temples in America, he also established the American Buddhist Association, the Buddhist Educational Centre in Chicago, Scouting Clubs, and many among other groups. Rev. Gyomay was a pioneer in American Buddhism, preaching Pureland Dharma while also conducting Zen meditation sessions. Returning to Japan in 1966, he attended Ōtani University in Kyoto for three years, pursuing special studies in Buddhism.

Rev. Gyomay extended the Buddhist ideal that duality is an illusion created by egotism, and that primordially everything is Oneness. Many of his lectures and teachings focus upon this, using a juxtaposition that oneness and individuality can coexist, provided one does not allow the ego to get in the way. Another focus of his was the extension of Kiyozawa's message, that Buddhism should be a personal experience and it is not sufficient to merely attend temple services and recite sutras. The experience must come from within, or there is no substance. To that end, Kubose placed the Buddha in the same field as Socrates, in that Buddhism should be regarded as a philosophy first, and a religion second. Philosophy is something a person contemplates anew, and while one may rely on the teachings of a religious tradition, the deeply personal practice of realizing Oneness and thereby Enlightenment must be one’s own. He published several books of his own Dharma writings, including Everyday Suchness and The Center Within, published collaborative works with other authors, and also published English translations of Japanese Buddhist texts, such as those by Haya Akegarasu with his own accompanying commentary.

== Legacy ==
Gyomay Kubose’s son, Koyo Kubose, was named his spiritual successor in 1998. Rev. Koyo later founded Bright Dawn Center of Oneness Buddhism to carry on the Dharma legacy of his father, a center which has thus far trained approximately one hundred non-sectarian Buddhist ministers.

== Works ==
- Everyday Suchness: Buddhist Essays on Everyday Living (1967, Dharma House Publication; ISBN 9780964299207)
- Zen Koans (1973, Dharma House Publishing; ISBN 9780964299221)
- Heart of the Great Wisdom Sutra (1975, Dharma House)
- American Buddhism: A New Direction (1976).
- Tan Butsu Ge (1976, Dharma House)
- The Fundamental Spirit of Buddhism (1977, Dharma House Publishing; ISBN 9780964299238)
- The Center Within (1986, Dharma House Publishing; ISBN 9780964299245)

== Awards and honors ==
In 2000 a street sign was installed in Chicago at the corner of N. Racine Av. and W. Leland Av. which reads "The Honorary Reverend Gyomay and Minnie Kubose Way" to honor his and his wife's contribution to the community.

In 1971 he was awarded the Buddhist Mission Cultural Award (Bukkyo Dendo Bunka-Sho) from Yehan Numata's Society for the Promotion of Buddhism (Bukkyo Dendo Kyokai).
