= Ohigashi schism =

The Ohigashi schism (お東騒動) was a religious schism in the Ōtani-ha (also known as Higashi Hongan-ji) subsect of the Jōdo Shinshū school of Buddhism that occurred in 1969 after a reformist group created internal divisions.

== History ==
The Dobokai movement (同朋会運動), a reform group within Higashi Hongan-ji, officially began on the 700th memorial of Shinran in 1962, though its roots were in a movement started in 1947 by a group of practitioners calling themselves the shinjinsha "true person community". The grass-roots reform group was led by Kurube Shin'yū. Akegarasu Haya, Soga Ryōjin, and other disciples of Kiyozawa Manshi were also closely involved.

The goal of the Dobokai movement was to awaken and unite members of Higashi Hongan-ji due to internal conflict over differences of doctrinal opinion such as over the idea of shinjin and whether the Pure Land was to be entered in death or in this life. The Dobokai movement based itself largely on the Tannishō, a collection of sayings attributed to Shinran with commentaries by Yuien-bo, one of his disciples, and the idea of cutting through spiritual differences.

The movement split Higashi Hongan-ji into four different groups. What is now known as the Higashi Honganji-ha is centered in Tokyo. The physical property of Higashi Hongan-ji temple is run by the much larger Ōtani-ha, which changed the temple's name to "Shinshū Mausoleum". Meanwhile, the treasure of Higashi Honganji-ha at the time, amounting to about $200 million in donations, was seized for use by a "nonprofit organization" which does not maintain any temples. In 2012 a court ruled that this money must be returned.
