= Xu You =

Xu You may refer to:

- Xu You (hermit) (許由) (fl. 23rd century BC), legendary hermit during Emperor Yao's time
- Xu You (Han dynasty) (許攸) (died 204), Han dynasty strategist
- Xu You (Southern Tang) (徐遊) (fl. 960), Southern Tang dynasty minister
