= Shōman-ji, Nagoya =

Buddhist temple in Japan

Coordinates: 35°09′48″N 136°54′22″E

Shōman-ji
- 勝鬘寺 しょうまんじ
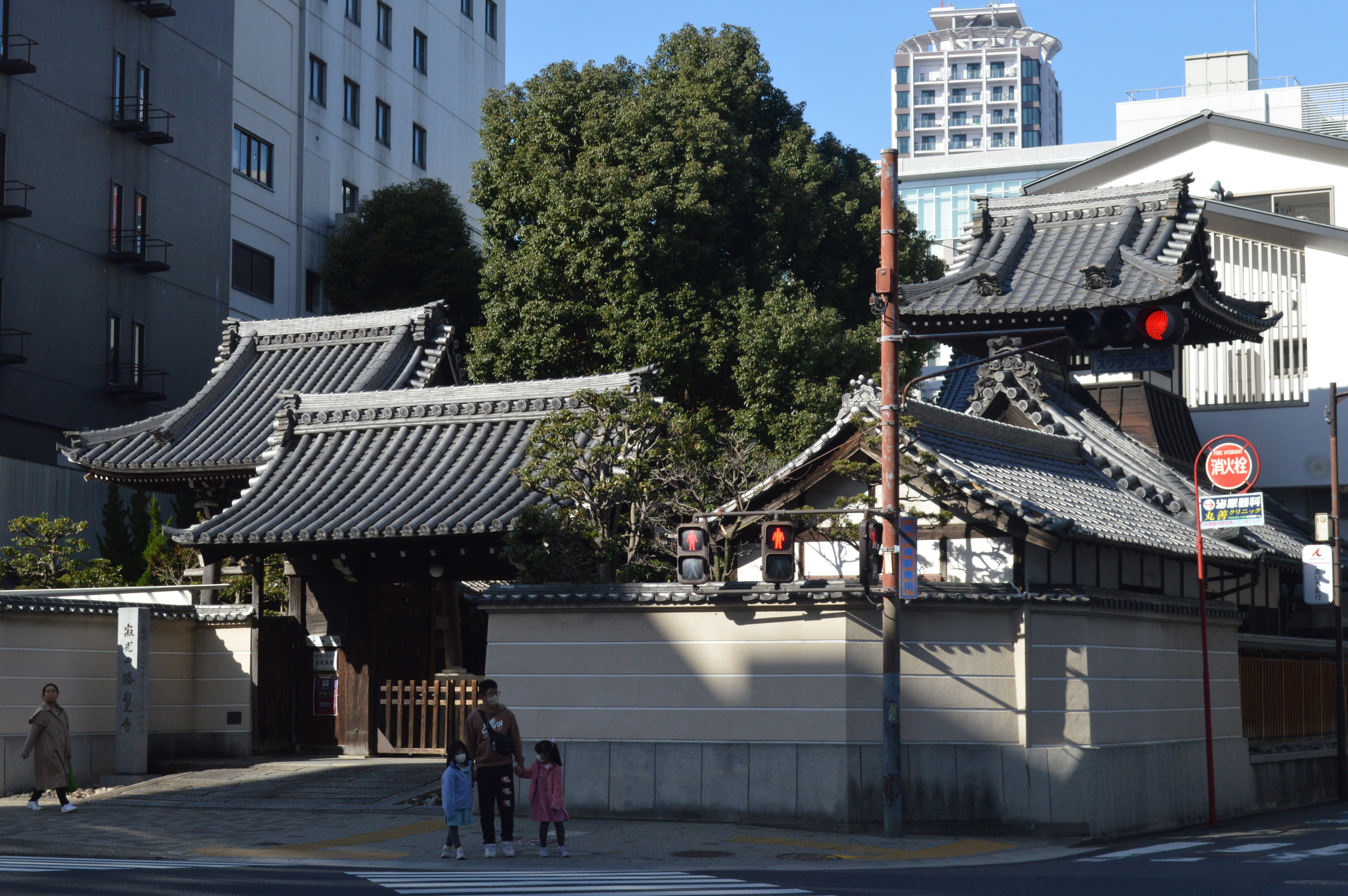

Religion
- Affiliation: Buddhism

Location
- Location: 3 Chome-33-10 Sakae, Naka-ku Ward, Nagoya, Aichi 460-0011, Japan

Architecture
- Founder: Ryoi
- Date established: 1573 - 1592

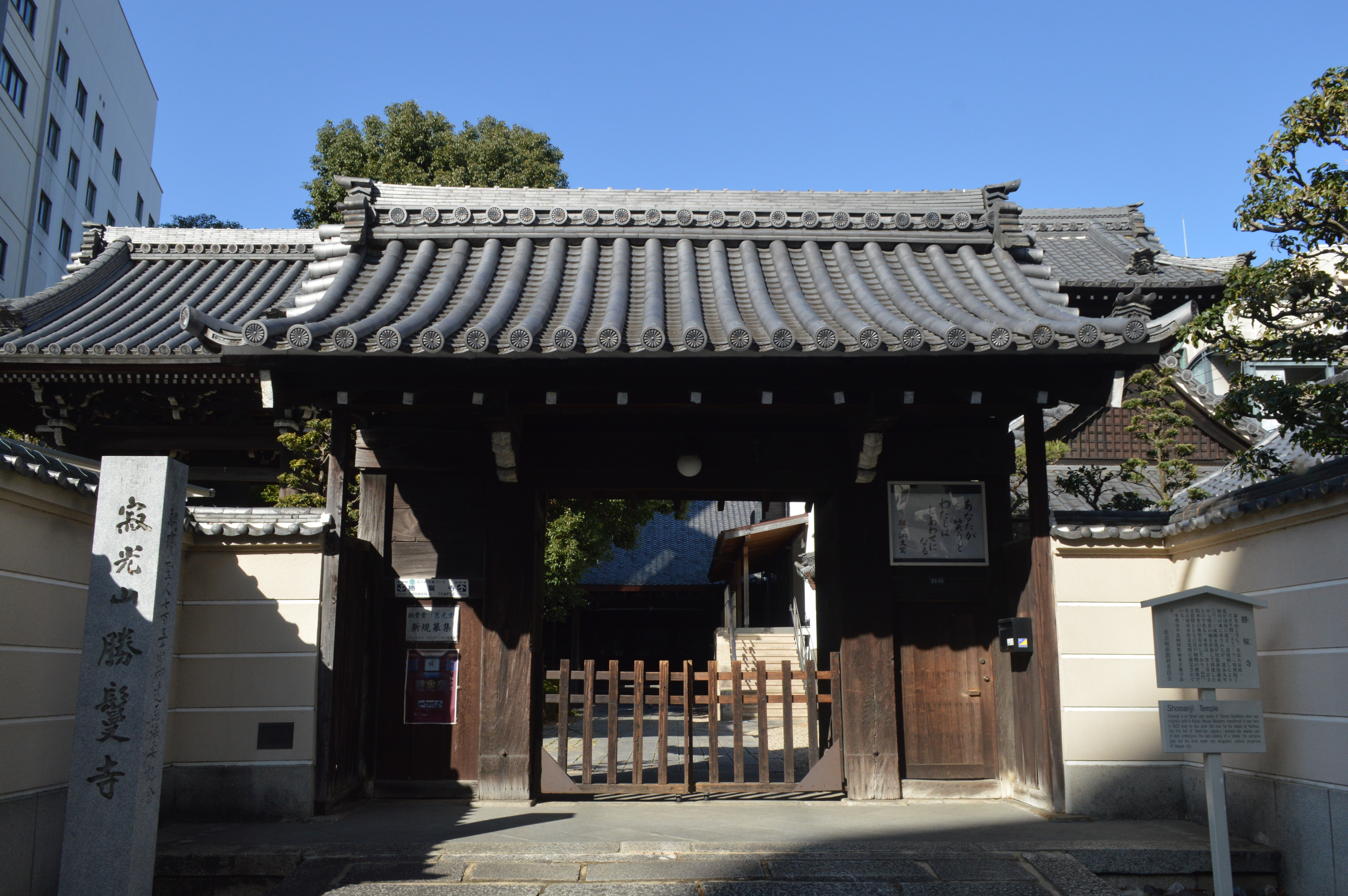
Main gate

Shōman-ji (勝鬘寺) is a Buddhist temple in Naka-ku, Nagoya, central Japan.

== History ==
The temple belongs to the Ōtani-ha sect of Shin Buddhism. It originally was located in Kiyosu and was transferred by Naruse Masatora, who had it transferred to its current location in 1632 when he was given the plot for the temple by Tokugawa Yoshinao, lord of Owari Domain.

The main building (hondo), the main gate and the drum tower were designated by the city as cultural properties.

== See also ==
- Shōman-ji, Tokyo
