= Shōman-ji, Tokyo =

Buddhist temple in Tokyo, Japan

Coordinates: 35.6370°N 139.7319°E

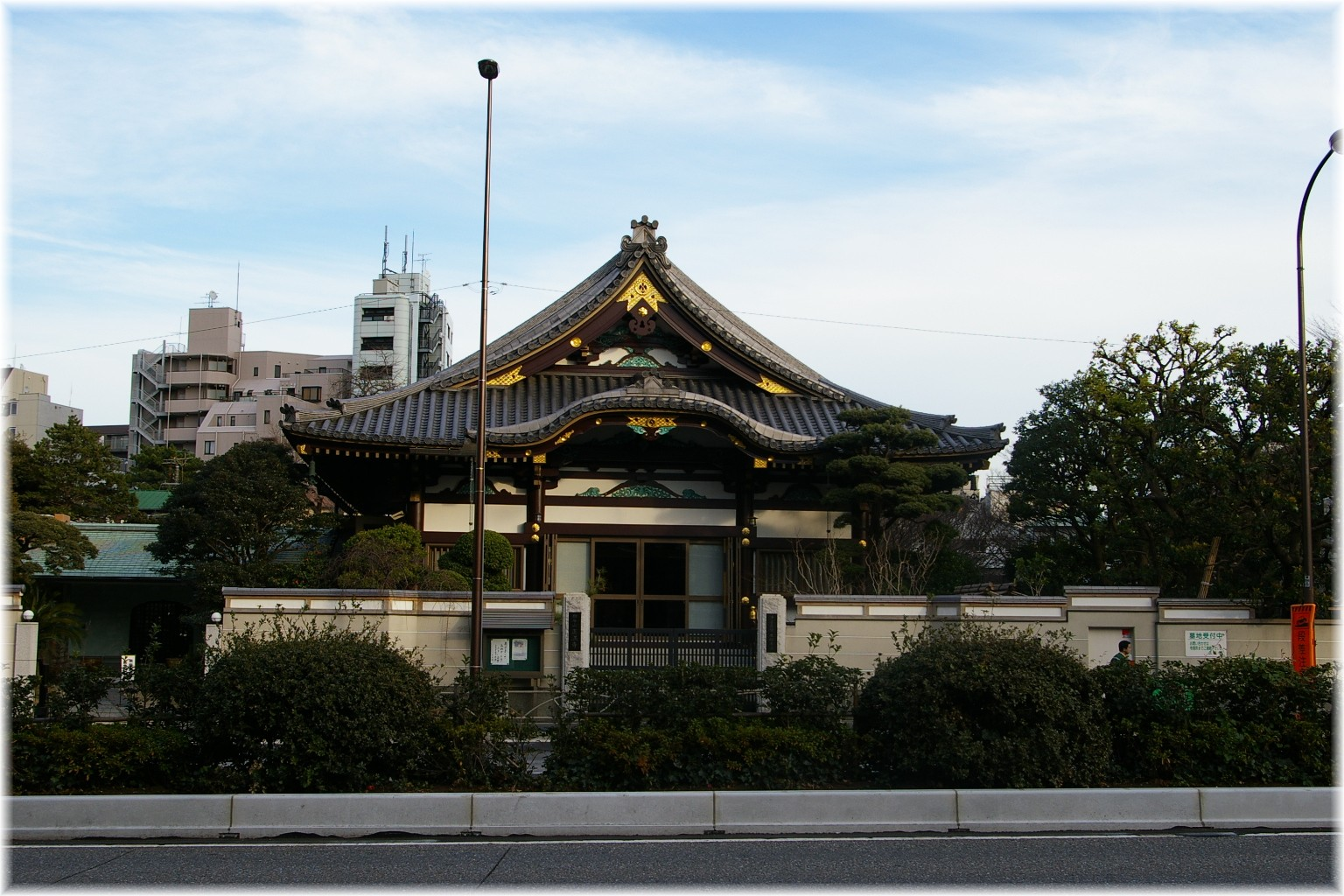
Shōman-ji in Tokyo

Shōman-ji (正満寺) is a Buddhist temple in Minato, Tokyo in Japan.

== See also ==
- Shōman-ji, Nagoya
