= Kaisan =

Japanese term for temple founder

Kaisan (開山) is a Japanese term used in reference to the founder of a school of Buddhism or the founder of a temple, literally meaning "mountain opener" or "to open a mountain." Chan monasteries of China and Japan have traditionally been built in mountainous regions, with the name of whatever mountain it has been built upon then fixed upon the monastery as well as the founding abbot.

== See also ==
- hinoshita kaisan
- kaisando
