= Higashi Otani =

Cemetery in Kyoto, Japan

- Interactive map of Higashi Otani

Details
- Location: Kyoto
- Country: Japan
- Coordinates: 35°00′08″N 135°46′57″E
- Type: Cemetery
- Website: http://www.higashihonganji.or.jp/english_top/

Higashi Otani (東大谷), also known as Ōtani Sobyō (大谷祖廟), is a mausoleum in the Higashiyama district of Kyoto, Japan. It serves as the mausoleum of Shinran, the founder of Jōdo Shinshū Buddhism, and is administered by the Shinshū Ōtani-ha, the Buddhist denomination associated with Higashi Hongan-ji. The mausoleum contains the remains of Shinran and those of successive heads of the Honganji tradition, as well as the remains of followers from across Japan.

The adjacent Higashi Otani Cemetery, located immediately south of the mausoleum, is a separate burial ground also administered by the Shinshū Ōtani-ha.

== History ==
The origins of Ōtani Sobyō date to 1272, ten years after the death of Shinran in 1262. His daughter Kakushinni and his followers established a memorial hall at Yoshimizu in Kyoto, where his remains were enshrined and an image of him was placed.

Following the division of the Honganji tradition into eastern and western branches, the mausoleum was relocated to its present site in Maruyama-chō, Higashiyama-ku, Kyoto, in 1670. The site became the principal mausoleum of the Shinshū Ōtani-ha.

The mausoleum was subsequently expanded. In 1745, the Tokugawa shogunate donated additional land for its enlargement.

== Higashi Otani Cemetery ==
The cemetery is located immediately south of Ōtani Sobyō. Its origins date to 1745, when land was donated by the Tokugawa shogunate for the expansion of the mausoleum grounds.

In 1872, the cemetery was transferred to Kyoto City and became municipal property. In 1892, the Shinshū Ōtani-ha took over its management, while ownership and administrative authority remained with the city. In 1964, an exchange of land between Kyoto City and Higashi Honganji resulted in the present arrangement.
