= Kiyozawa Manshi =

Japanese Shin Buddhist reformer (1863–1903)

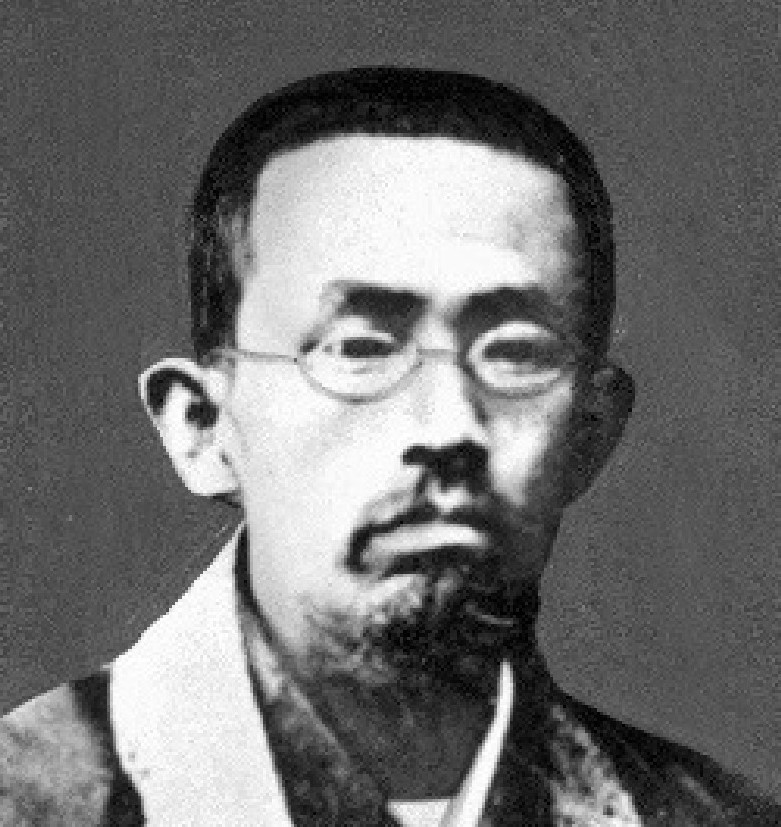

Personal life
- Born: August 10, 1863 Aichi, Nagoya, Japan
- Died: June 6, 1903 (aged 39)
- Occupation: Buddhist priest and philosopher

Religious life
- Religion: Buddhism

Kiyozawa Manshi (清沢 満之; 1863–1903) was a Japanese Shin Buddhist thinker, academic and reformer of the Ōtani-ha branch. He is one of the most influential figures of Shin Buddhist modernism, known for his articulation of the philosophy of Seishinshugi (精神主義), which can be translated as “Cultivating Spirituality.” Seishinshugi thought prioritized personal religious experience and was influenced by Western philosophies like religious existentialism, Hegel and Stoicism.

== Biography ==
Kiyozawa studied at Tokyo University. Among various topics, he studied Western philosophy under the American philosopher Ernest Fenollosa.

Kiyozawa was instrumental to the establishment of Shinshū University in Tokyo in 1901. The university is now known as Ōtani University, and is located in Kyoto near Higashi Hongan-ji. Kiyozawa served as the first dean of the university.

Kiyozawa was an advocate for the modernization and reform of Shin Buddhist education and Shin institutions, which he saw as outdated and rigid. The established systems of scholastic training in the Shin sect had long been organized around shūgaku, a mode of study aimed at mastering officially sanctioned interpretations of scripture and thus served to transmit doctrinal orthodoxy. These seminaries promoted a tightly controlled curriculum in an intellectual environment where students learned predetermined answers rather than cultivated independent engagement with the Pure Land teachings of Shinran.

Kiyozawa Manshi criticized this system by distinguishing shūgaku, which he treated as the sphere of critical reflection, from shūgi, the foundational doctrinal truth established by a school's founder. In his analysis, shūgi constituted the non-negotiable core to which adherents were committed, whereas shūgaku should have remained an open domain of interpretive reasoning in which debate and disagreement were signs of genuine understanding. In his many writings, he argued that Honganji authorities had conflated these categories in their attempts to maintain orthodoxy. Young clergy were thus being trained to memorize traditional explanations rather than examine them critically. Kiyozawa also contended that Shin learning had become excessively intellectualized. Concepts such as other-power, which for Shinran denoted an existential and experiential awakening to one's own limitations, were reduced to abstract propositions students believed they could comprehend through lectures alone. By ignoring the experiential dimension of practice, the seminaries rendered living religious insights inert, transforming them into mere "dead words."

Kiyozawa gathered a group of followers called themselves Kōkōdō. They published their ideas a journal named Seishinkai (Spiritual World). According to Blum, this movement was "the most important new conception of Shin thought since Rennyo reformed Honganji in the fifteenth century." Many Higashi Hongan-ji scholars trace their line of thought to Kiyozawa Manshi, including such men as Akegarasu Haya (1877–1954), Kaneko Daiei (1881–1976), Soga Ryōjin (1875–1971) and Maida Shuichi (1906–1967). Some of his essays were translated into English, such as the book December Fan, and have found a Western readership. Kiyozawa's ideas sparked much interest, but his modernist movement faced serious criticisms and backlash from traditional scholars and the leadership of the Honganji, culminating in the expulsion of several key Kōkōdō members from Otani university for their heterodox ideas.

Kiyozawa himself died quite young of tuberculosis in 1903, and therefore some consider his thought to be immature and incomplete. Even today, many conservative Shin thinkers see Kiyozawa as being emblematic of what had gone wrong with the Ōtani school. While his thought remains controversial, he is still seen as one of the most influential figures in modern Shin thought. According to Mark Blum, while "Seishinshugi has been controversial from the start and remains so today," it was still extremely influential on all modern Shin thinkers, even those who rejected it. Kiyozawa's movement continued after his death, and led to the Dobokai movement (同朋会運動), a reform group formed in 1947 composed of many disciples of Kiyozawa, including Kurube Shin'yū. Akegarasu Haya, Soga Ryōjin.The conflicts between this movement and traditional Honganji leadership led to the Ohigashi schism (お東騒動).

== Thought ==
Kiyozawa Manshi's articulation of Seishinshugi emerged at the turn of the twentieth century within the context of his small intellectual community, the Kōkōdō, established near Tokyo University in 1900. The group gathered around a rented house used for communal study and religious inquiry, and soon produced the journal Seishinkai to present their ideas to a broader audience. In the inaugural issue of January 1901, Kiyozawa published an essay titled “Seishinshugi,” which defined the movement's philosophical orientation and invited individuals of any background to participate in open study sessions dedicated to the “cultivation of the path.” During the same period, Kiyozawa was appointed founding president of Shinshū University, insisting that the institution remain in Tokyo in order to distance its intellectual activity from Kyoto's conservative religious establishment, though the school was moved to Kyoto after his death and later became Ōtani University.

A major consequence of the Kōkōdō circle and its Seishinshugi was the renewed attention it directed toward the Tannishō, a concise record of Shinran's sayings compiled by Yuien. Although the text had received some scholarly commentaries in the late Edo period, it was not central to sectarian curricula. Under Kiyozawa's influence, figures such as Akegarasu Haya began publishing studies, annotated editions, and public lectures on the Tannishō, greatly expanding its readership. Kiyozawa himself identified three works as foundational for his own spiritual and philosophical development: the Āgama scriptures, the Discourses of Epictetus, and the Tannishō. Kiyozawa valued the Āgamas and Epictetus due to their emphasis on serious and radical practices that abandoned all things in favor of religious and philosophical pursuit of the highest good. Through the efforts of the Seishinkai contributors, especially Akegarasu's serialized commentaries from 1903 to 1911, the Tannishō gradually became one of the most widely read Buddhist texts in Japan, helping shape modern understandings of Shinran's thought.

Kiyozawa used the term Seishinshugi to denote the disciplined pursuit of an internally grounded spiritual life that simultaneously provides a foundation for social harmony. The movement framed this quest as a classic Buddhist path, though articulated in newly coined modern terminology. Kiyozawa frequently coined neologisms ending in -shugi to indicate philosophical positions, ethical stances, or modes of inner cultivation. They include naikan-shugi (introspective subjectivism), zensekinin-shugi (total responsibility), and tariki-shugi (other-powerism). Among these neologisms, naikan-shugi was particularly central, since it signified a method of self-examination in which authentic truth is discovered through reflective introspection and then applying it in outward conduct. In this sense Seishinshugi functioned as Kiyozawa's “first philosophy,” asserting that genuine religious experience must serve as the primary ground for any coherent system of values, ethics, or social engagement.

A further dimension of Seishinshugi was Kiyozawa's insistence on an ascetic orientation, unusual within the institutional context of Meiji Shin Buddhism. He argued that authentic religious commitment requires the abandonment of reliance on all external supports, including family, wealth, social standing, education, or national identity. This demand did not necessarily prescribe literal withdrawal from worldly occupations, but rather a radical inner reorientation such that one's ultimate refuge is sought solely in the Buddha, the Infinite. For Kiyozawa, this inner detachment reflected the classical Buddhist paradigm of renunciation exemplified in Śākyamuni Buddha's life, and he regarded it as the necessary condition for entering what he called the “divine ground” of religion. This emphasis drew criticism from contemporaries who feared that the movement subordinated social duties to self-cultivation, yet Kiyozawa viewed his stance as a return to Buddhism's foundational commitment to transcending conditioned identity.

Kiyozawa's Seishinshugi thought was articulated in three interrelated domains: the internal–personal, the external–religious, and the external–social. The internal dimension centered on naikan, a practice of reflective meditation whose goal is self-understanding. Naikan focuses on understanding how suffering emerges primarily from internal causes and on understanding our own perceptions of the world. The religious dimension balanced this subjectivism with two overarching ideas: "the truth of the unity of all phenomena" (which resembles the Huayan conception of interdependence) and the necessity of “absolute other-power” (zettai tariki), in which the individual relinquishes all things to Amida Buddha. Kiyozawa saw the other-power, Amida Buddha, as a symbol pointing to the ultimate principle of the universe. According to Dobbins, "Kiyozawa borrowed from Hegelian idealism—describing Amida as absolute spirit and as the single great principle underlying the universe." According to Kiyozawa, "Amida Buddha is an expedient expression signifying the infinite, the universe as a whole, or the law that courses through and animates that universe."

Seishinshugi's social dimension, the most contentious one to Shin tradition, reflected Kiyozawa's deep mistrust of ethical systems and social norms detached from personal spiritual grounding. He held that the religious individual must maintain inner equilibrium even within oppressive social conditions, subordinating all conventional obligations to the pursuit of religious truth. This synthesis of introspective subjectivity, cosmic interrelationship, and radical reliance on Amida formed the distinctive worldview of Seishinshugi, marking it as one of the seminal developments in modern Shin Buddhist thought.

== Works translated to English ==
Two translations has been made of Manshi's essays:

- Selected Essays of Manshi Kiyozawa. Translated by Kunji, Tajima; Shacklock, Floyd. Bukkyō Bunka Society. 1936. OCLC 2288245.
- December Fan: The Buddhist Essays of Manshi Kiyozawa. Translated by Haneda, Nobuo (First ed.). Higashi Honganji. 1984. OCLC 20248970.

- December Fan: The Buddhist Essays of Manshi Kiyozawa. Translated by Haneda, Nobuo (Second ed.). Shinshu Center of America. 2014. ISBN 9780615657639. OCLC 1031408555.
