= Tannishō =

The Tannishō (歎異抄), also known as the Lamentations of Divergences, is a late 13th century short Buddhist text generally thought to have been written by Yuien, a disciple of Shinran. In the Tannishō, Yuien is concerned about the rising doctrinal divergences that emerged in Jōdo Shinshū Buddhism after the death of their founder, so he wrote down dialogues between himself and Shinran that he could recall when his master was alive.

According to Yuien's own writing in the preface:

When I reflect with deep humility upon the past and the present, I cannot help but deplore the prevalence of various deviations from the true faith transmitted by word of mouth from our late Master... Therefore I have recorded here the gist of what the late Shinran Shonin told me, while it still reverberates in my ears. This has been written solely to clear away in advance any uncertainties that might arise among fellow devotees. So much by way of foreword.

Many of the conversations found in the Tannishō are candid when compared to more formal religious texts, and this may explain some of the popularity of the Tannishō among Jōdo Shinshū Buddhists. The Tannishō allows Jōdo Shinshū Buddhists to peer into the mind of Shinran and see how he felt about practicing Jōdo Shinshū. The Tannishō was also a major impetus for the start of the Dobokai Movement among the Higashi Hongwan-ji branch of Jōdo Shinshū.

== Format ==
The Tannishō is divided into 18 sections (sometimes called chapters), though many of these sections are very short. Some are no longer than a couple of sentences. However, each section deals with a separate doctrinal issue.

Sections 1 through 10 focus on Shinran's thoughts with regard to Jōdo Shinshū, the nembutsu and Amida Buddha, while sections 11 through 18 deal with heretical ideas that Yuien wanted to dispel or correct on the basis of what Shinran had taught him. Further, an appendix discusses the history of the exile of Shinran and other disciples of the Pure Land movement, including his teacher Hōnen, from the capitol during the reign of Emperor Go-oba. Finally, a postscript, composed by Rennyo states that:

右斯聖教者為当流大事聖教也

於無宿善機無左右不可許之者也

This sacred scripture is one of the most valuable texts of our school.

Those insufficiently matured in faith should not be allowed indiscriminately to read it.

— Shaku Rennyo (釈蓮如御判)

=== Notable Quotations ===
From chapter 3:

善人(ぜんにん)なをもて往生(おうじょう)をとぐ、いはんや悪人(あくにん)をや
"Even a virtuous person can attain rebirth in the Pure Land, how much more easily a wicked person!"

From chapter 8:

念仏(ねんぶつ)は行者(ぎょうじゃ)のために非行(ひぎょう)非善(ひぜん)なり。
わがはからひにて行(ぎょう)ずるにあらざれば非行(ひぎょう)といふ。
わがはからひにてつくる善(ぜん)にもあらざれば非善(ひぜん)といふ。

"The saying of nembutsu is neither a religious practice nor a good act.
Since it is practiced without any calculation, it is "non-practice."

Since it is also not a good created by my calculation, it is "non-good."
