= Akegarasu Haya =

Akegarasu Haya (暁烏 敏; 1877–1954) was a Shin Buddhist priest in Ōtani-ha. For a decade he was a student of the Shin reformer Kiyozawa Manshi. Akegarasu was also a former head of administration of the Higashi Hongan-ji who was a major inspiration to the formation of the Dobokai Movement.

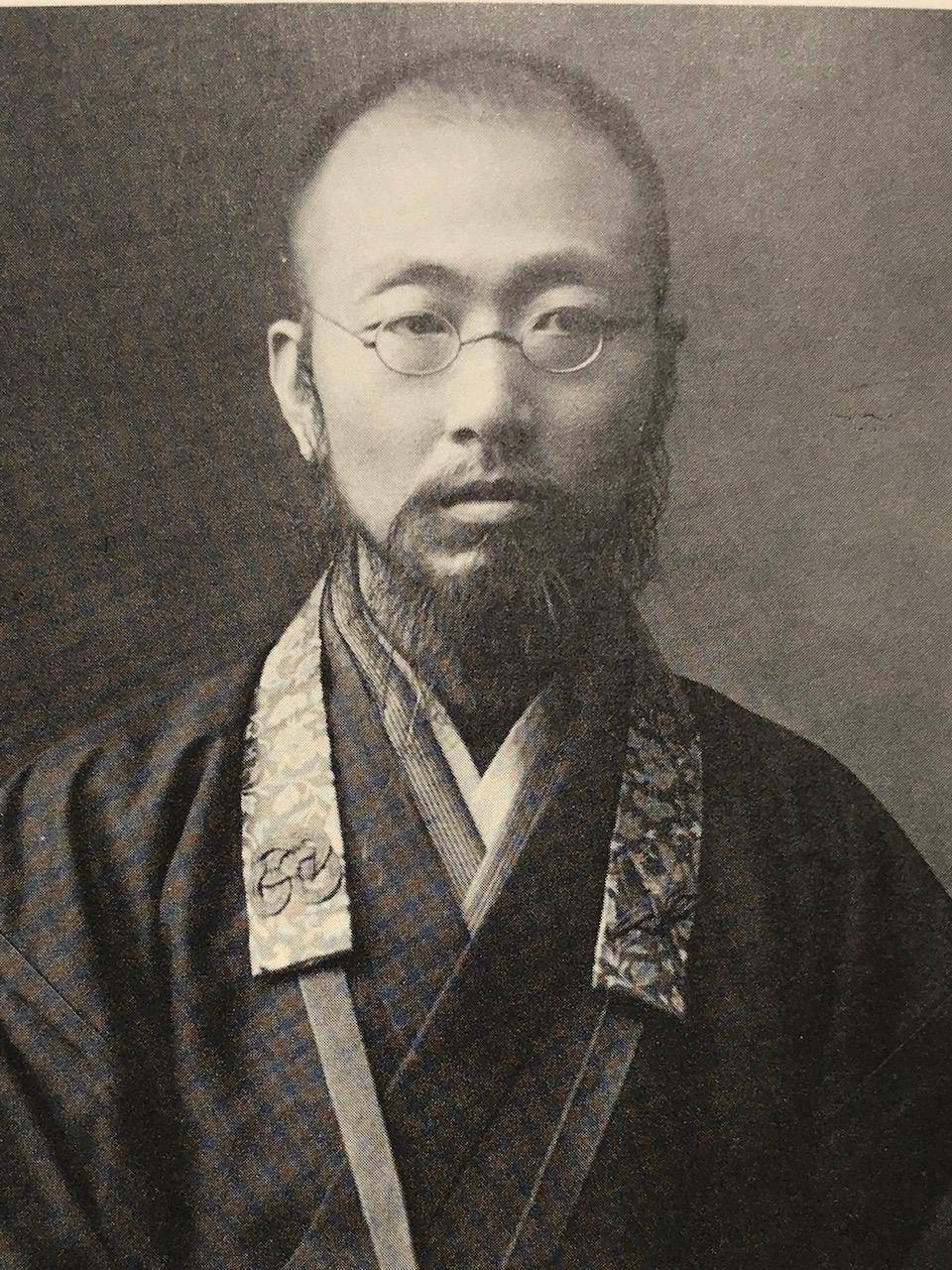
Rev. Akegarasu Haya as a young man (暁烏 敏, 1877-1954)

== Early life ==
He was born into a Jodo Shinshu temple family in Ishikawa prefecture and was the family's only son. Due to his father Enen's death when he was 10, his mother Taki struggled through the hardships associated with poverty and single parenthood while raising him. He received traditionalist Jōdo Shinshū teachings until his fateful meeting, and by the age of fourteen, the talented writer had published several books of 31-syllable poetry.

== Revival movement ==
Rev. Kiyozawa Manshi, a great Japanese Shin reformer who taught Buddhism through life experience, met him on September 11, 1893, and became his teacher. Akegarasu was 16 and Kiyozawa was 31. For approximately the next ten years the two attempted to translate Buddhism into ordinary language and to manifest it into their simple everyday living. When Kiyozawa died on June 6, 1903, Akegarasu felt that he had been thoroughly crushed by his teacher's teachings. Akegarasu then led Kiyozawa's revival movement and wrote extensively for the next decade.

A series of severe crises struck Rev. Akegarasu during his mid-30s. His wife died, then his reputation as a minister and as the leader of Rev. Kiyozawa's revival movement came under attack by party-spirit factionalists. At that time, the Amitābha Buddha image that Rev. Akegarasu cherished was shattered, and no traditional forms of practice satisfied. But upon re-reading the Longer Sukhāvatīvyūha Sūtra he felt that he was finally beginning to realize the essential message of his teacher Rev. Kiyozawa, via the text of that Sutra. His experiential insight was that the story of Larger Sutra, where the hero, Dharmakara Bodhisattva, eventually becomes Amida Buddha, was expressing a timeless spirit emerging then and there within his own heart-mind. Amida's primal vow was his own authentic aspiration to become a Buddha and to save all sentient beings. From then on he taught that Amida Buddha represents that which practitioners should become.

In 1949, Akegarasu focused Shin practice in the direction of faith alone, declaring in a statement to his disciples: "First shinjin, second shinjin, third shinjin." This is basically the moment where Dobokai became official, although the movement did not receive official recognition until 1962. The early roots for the Dobokai Movement faith movement began in 1947 as the shinjinsha, or, 'true person community'.

== Death ==
Akegarasu died August 27, 1954.

== Writings ==
The earliest English translation of Akegarasu's writings can be found in Selections From The Nippon Seishin Library, which Akegarasu published in 1936 (translators Hata Taigan, Hanaoka Kimi, Imadate Tosui and others). In 1977 to commemorate the centennial of Akegarasu's birth, two ministers of the Buddhist Temple of Chicago who were his direct students published their translations: The Fundamental Spirit of Buddhism translated by Gyomay Kubose with Nancy DeRoin and Shout of Buddha: Writings of Haya Akegarasu translated by Gyoko Saito with Joan Sweany.

One of Akegarasu's main students was Shuichi Maida (1906-1967). Gyoko Saito and Gyomay Kubose were also among his prominent students.

Akegarasu's poem “Who am I?” concludes:
I alone
am the most noble:
I embrace the cosmos.

What an indescribable, subtle
existence I am! - I cannot in
speaking or writing
put down who I am!

I always touch this indescribable self,
always follow this indescribable self.
Truth is here.
