= Kaneko Daiei =

Kaneko Daiei (金子 大栄; 1881-1976) was a Japanese Shin Buddhist philosopher and priest during the first half of the 20th century, belonging to the Ōtani-ha branch of Shin Buddhism. He was born to the priest of Saiken-ji, a Shin Buddhist temple in Jōetsu, Niigata Prefecture. He attended Shinshu University from 1901 when it was under the new leadership of Kiyozawa Manshi. It was at this time that he met and became close to Soga Ryojin. After graduating, he returned home and worked to propagate the ideas of Kiyozawa. In 1916, Kaneko took up a position on the faculty of Ōtani University. In 1925 and 1926, he published three works that took a controversial position on the nature of the Pure Land, and the authorities within the Higashi Hongan-ji judged his views to be heretical. In 1928, he resigned his professorship under pressure, and was suspended from the priesthood. He had to leave Kyoto and take up a position teaching at Hiroshima Bunkyo University. During this time, he continued to write, to publish, and to give Dharma talks all around the country. In 1941, the Jodo Shinshu leadership reinstated his priestly faculties and had him return to Ōtani University.

Kaneko authored many essays and books on Shin Buddhist thought as well as the history of Buddhism. These have come to be held in very high regard, helping to sculpt modern day Jodo Shinshu philosophy. He was a good friend of Soga Ryojin (1875 – 1971), another student of Manshi who likewise taught at Otani University.

== Bibliography ==
- Andreasen, Esben. Popular Buddhism in Japan: Shin Buddhist Religion & Culture. Honolulu: University of Hawaii Press, 1998.
- Bandō, Shōjun. "Kaneko Daiei, 1881-1976." Eastern Buddhist New Series 10, No. 1 (May, 1977): 162–163.
- Rhodes, Robert F. "Kaneko Daiei: Life and Thought." In Cultivating Spirituality: A Modern Shin Buddhist Anthology, edited by Robert F. Rhodes and Mark L. Blum, 159–216. Albany: State University of New York Press, 2011.
