= Kaisando =

Japanese Buddhist monastery hall

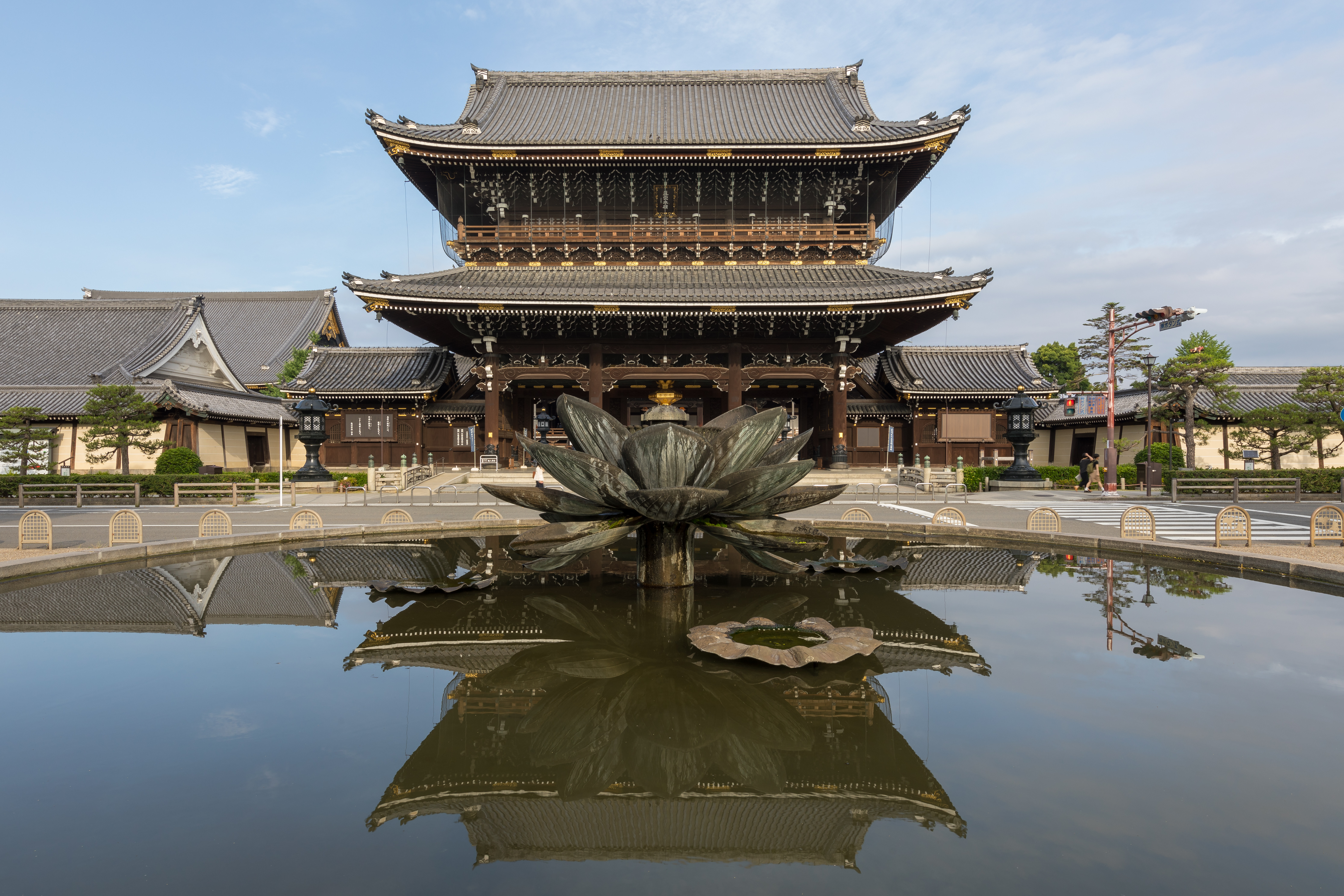
Founder's Hall gate of Higashi-Honganji Temple

A kaisan-dō (開山堂, kaisan-dō), also termed the Founder's Hall, is a temple structure in a Japanese Buddhist monastery complex or other temple where an image (or images) of the founding abbot and other significant teachers and Buddha ancestors are kept, along with a memorial slab (Japanese ihai). Sometimes also referred to as the Patriarch Hall (soshido) or Reflection Hall (Eishitsu), this building holds memorial services yearly on the anniversary of the death of the founding abbot.

The largest Founder's Hall in Japan is the Goei-dō (御影堂) in front of the Higashi Hongwanji (Hongan-ji) Temple in Kyoto, Japan, one of two head temples of the Jōdo Shinshū sect of Buddhism.

== See also ==
- Kaisan
- Kuri
