= Soga Ryōjin =

Japanese Buddhist philosopher and priest

- Born: August 5, 1875; Niigata, Niigata Prefecture, Japan
- Died: June 20, 1971 (95 years)

Soga Ryōjin (曽我 量深; August 5, 1875 – June 20, 1971) was a Japanese Buddhist philosopher and priest of the Ōtani-ha of Jōdo Shinshū Buddhism. He served as the 17th president of Ōtani University from 1961 to 1967.

== Biography ==
Soga was born in the city of Niigata, Niigata Prefecture. He graduated from Shinshu University, later known as Ōtani University, in 1901, after which he returned to Niigata and became the adopted son-in-law of the priest of Jō'on-ji, a Buddhist temple in Mitsuke, Niigata.

Soga returned to study at Ōtani University and became a disciple of Kiyozawa Manshi (1863 – 1903), and a member of Ōtani-ha. He was a professor at Toyo University from 1916 to 1924, and then a professor at Ōtani University for 25 years.

Soga Ryōjin developed a subjective and personal approach to Jōdo Shinshū studies, building on the thought of Kiyozawa Manshi, which he summarised in the words; "We do not believe in Buddha or God because they actually exist; they exist because we believe in them." Soga's writing on the topic in his book Nyorai hyōgen no hanchū to shiteno sanjinkan, published in 1928, brought him into strong conflict with his denomination. He left his professorship at Ōtani University soon after in April 1930.

Soga differentiated the Jōdo Shinshū perspective from the "Pure Land as mind alone" doctrine found in some Pure Land and Zen schools:

"Those who believe in 'self-power' proudly boast, 'I am Tathagata!' Those of other Pure Land sects vainly lament this life, saying, 'The Tathagata is the Tathagata.' We [Jodo Shinshu followers] are surprised by the wonderous meaning of 'the Tathagata is me.' At the same time, we are aware that ultimately, 'I am me and not Tathagata.'"

After leaving Ōtani, Soga founded the Koho Gakuen in Kyoto with his close friend, the scholar Kaneko Daiei (1881 – 1976). Soga returned as a professor at Ōtani University in 1941. He served as the 17th president of the university from 1961 to 1967.

Soga died on June 20, 1971.

== Works translated into English ==
- The Core of Shinshu
- The Savior on earth: The significance of Dharmakara Bodhisattva's appearance in this world.
- Kaishin: The Open Spirit
- Storage consciousness
- A Soga Ryōjin Reader
