= Xu You (hermit) =

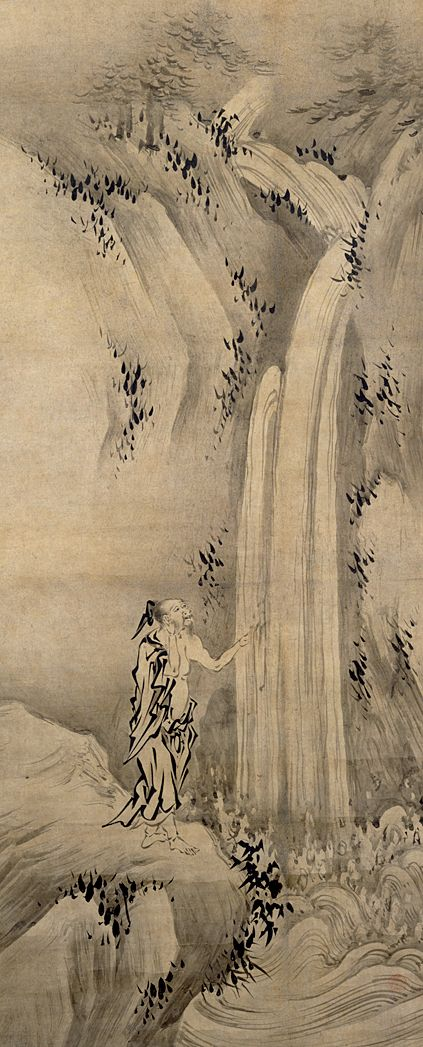
Portrait of Xu You, attributed to Kanō Eitoku, 16th century

Xu You or Hsü Yu (simplified Chinese: 许由; traditional Chinese: 許由; pinyin: Xǔ Yóu) was a legendary Chinese recluse who lived during the reign of the Emperor Yao (traditionally c. 2356–2255 BC), residing next to the Ying River. The emperor allegedly offered him the royal throne towards the end of his rule.

== Life ==
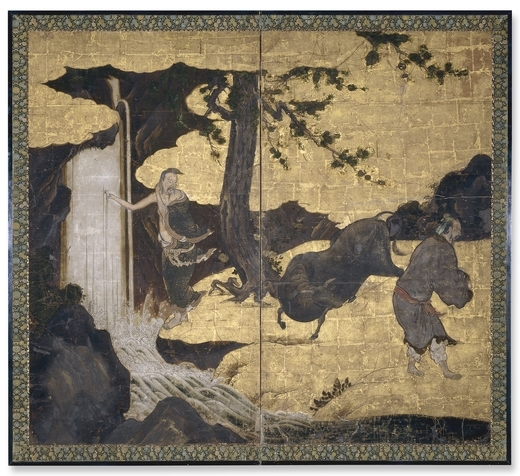
Xu You and Chao Fu, byōbu attributed to the Kanō school, British Museum

Xu You denounced the society and retreated to the north of Ying River. Living a simple life, he scooped river water with his bare hands, even though he had a calabash gourd. Xu was a disciple of the teacher Gnaw Gap (齧缺; Niè Quē). The legendary ruler Emperor Yao regarded Xu with utmost respect and requested that he be his teacher. They shared a positive relationship. Towards the end of Yao's rule (traditionally believed to be circa 2256 BC), the ruler chose Xu as his successor. (Much later, the Chinese sage Confucius greatly lauded Yao's decision to appoint Xu as the next emperor in line.) However, Xu refused to accept the throne, commenting that he had "no need for all under heaven". Legend goes on to state that an abashed Xu "washed out" his ears' contents into the Ying River, contaminating it. After Xu died, he was apparently buried at the summit of Mount Qi (箕山). The Han dynasty historian Sima Qian mentioned Xu in a chapter of his work Records of the Grand Historian. Sima personally visited the alleged grave of Xu and wrote that Xu was an epitome of "highest virtue".

Xu You is also depicted in a seventeenth-century Japanese artwork titled Xu You and Chao Fu, illustrating the popular tale of another fellow hermit detouring from the Ying River because of the filth Xu had contributed to it by washing out his ears there. It is now housed at the British Museum.

== Bibliography ==
- Zhuangzi (1998). Wandering on the Way: Early Taoist Tales and Parables of Chuang Tzu. University of Hawaii Press. ISBN 978-0-8248-2038-1.
