= Higashi Hongan-ji =

Japanese temple

Higashi Hongan-ji 東本願寺
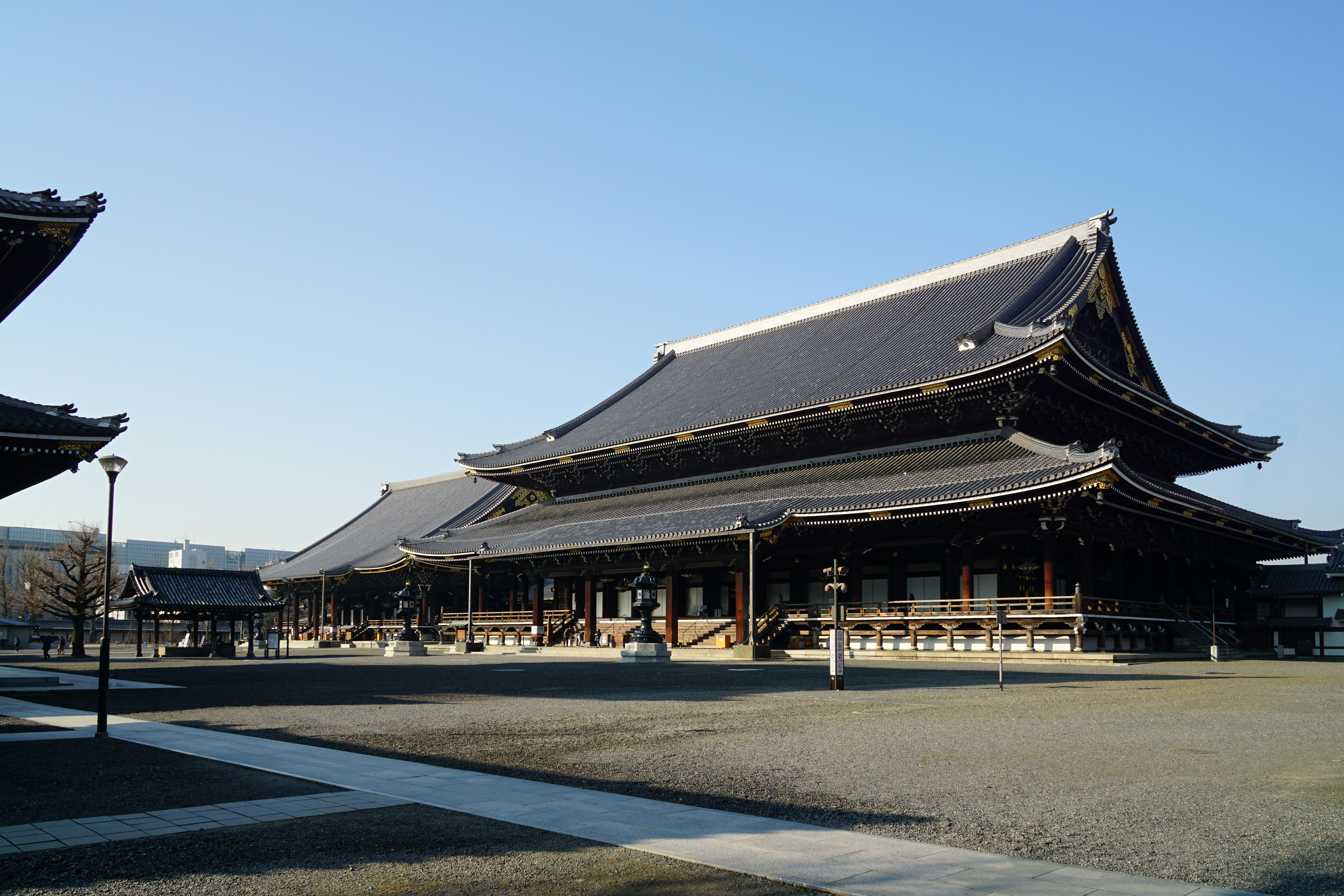
- Higashi Hongan-ji

- Location within Japan

Religion
- Affiliation: Jōdo Shinshū, Ōtani-ha
- Status: Head temple

Location
- Location: 754 Tokiwa-machi, north of Karasuma and Shichijō, Shimogyō-ku, Kyoto, Kyoto Prefecture
- Country: Japan
- Coordinates: 34°59′27.66″N 135°45′30.44″E

Website
- Ōtani-ha (Higashi Honganji)

Higashi Hongan-ji (東本願寺, Eastern Monastery of the Original Vow) is one of two dominant sub-sects of Jōdo Shinshū in Japan and abroad, the other being Nishi Hongan-ji, the "Western Temple of the Original Vow". It is also the name of the head temple of the Ōtani-ha branch of Jōdo Shinshū in Kyoto, which was most recently constructed in 1895 after a fire burned down the previous temple. As with many sites in Kyoto, these two complexes have more casual names and are known in Kyoto as Onissan (お西さん; Honorable Mr. West) and Ohigashisan (お東さん; Honorable Mr. East).

== History ==
Higashi Honganji was established in 1602 by the shōgun Tokugawa Ieyasu when he split the sect in two (Nishi Honganji being the other) in order to diminish its power. The temple was first built in its present location in 1658.

The temple grounds feature a mausoleum containing the ashes of Jōdo Shinshū founder Shinran. The mausoleum was initially constructed in 1272 and relocated several times before being relocated to its current site in 1670.

At the center of the temple is the Goei-dō, where an image of Shinran is enshrined. The hall is one of the largest wooden structures in the world at 76 metres (249 ft) in length, 58 metres (190 ft) in width, and 38 metres (125 ft) in height. The current hall was constructed in 1895.

The Amida Hall, to the left of the Goei-dō, contains an image of the Buddha Amitābha, called Amida in Japanese, along with an image of Prince Shōtoku, who introduced Buddhism to Japan. The hall is ornately decorated with gold leaf and art from the Meiji era. The current hall was constructed in 1895.

Various parts of Higashi Honganji, including the Goei-dō and Amida Hall, burned down four times during the Edo period. Monetary assistance was often given to Higashi Honganji by the Tokugawa shogunate in order to rebuild. The Great Tenmei Fire of Kyoto caused many temple buildings to burn down in 1788, and the temple was rebuilt in 1797. An accidental fire destroyed many of the temple buildings in 1823, and they were rebuilt in 1835. After burning down once again in 1858, the destroyed halls were quickly and temporarily reconstructed for Shinran's 600th Memorial Service in 1861. However, these temporary halls burned down in a city-wide fire caused by the Kinmon incident on July 19, 1864. The temple finally started to rebuild in 1879 after the fall of the Tokugawa Shogunate and once conflict caused by the Meiji Restoration of 1868 had settled down. The Goei-dō and Amida Hall were completed in 1895, with other buildings being restored by 1911. These buildings comprise the current temple.

During the twentieth century, Higashi Hongan-ji was troubled by political disagreements, financial scandals, and family disputes, and subsequently fractured into several further subdivisions (see Ohigashi schism). The largest Higashi Honganji grouping, Otani-ha has approximately 5.5 million members, according to statistics. However, within this climate of instability, the Higashi Honganji also produced a significant number of extremely influential thinkers, such as Soga Ryojin, Kiyozawa Manshi, Kaneko Daiei and Haya Akegarasu, amongst others.

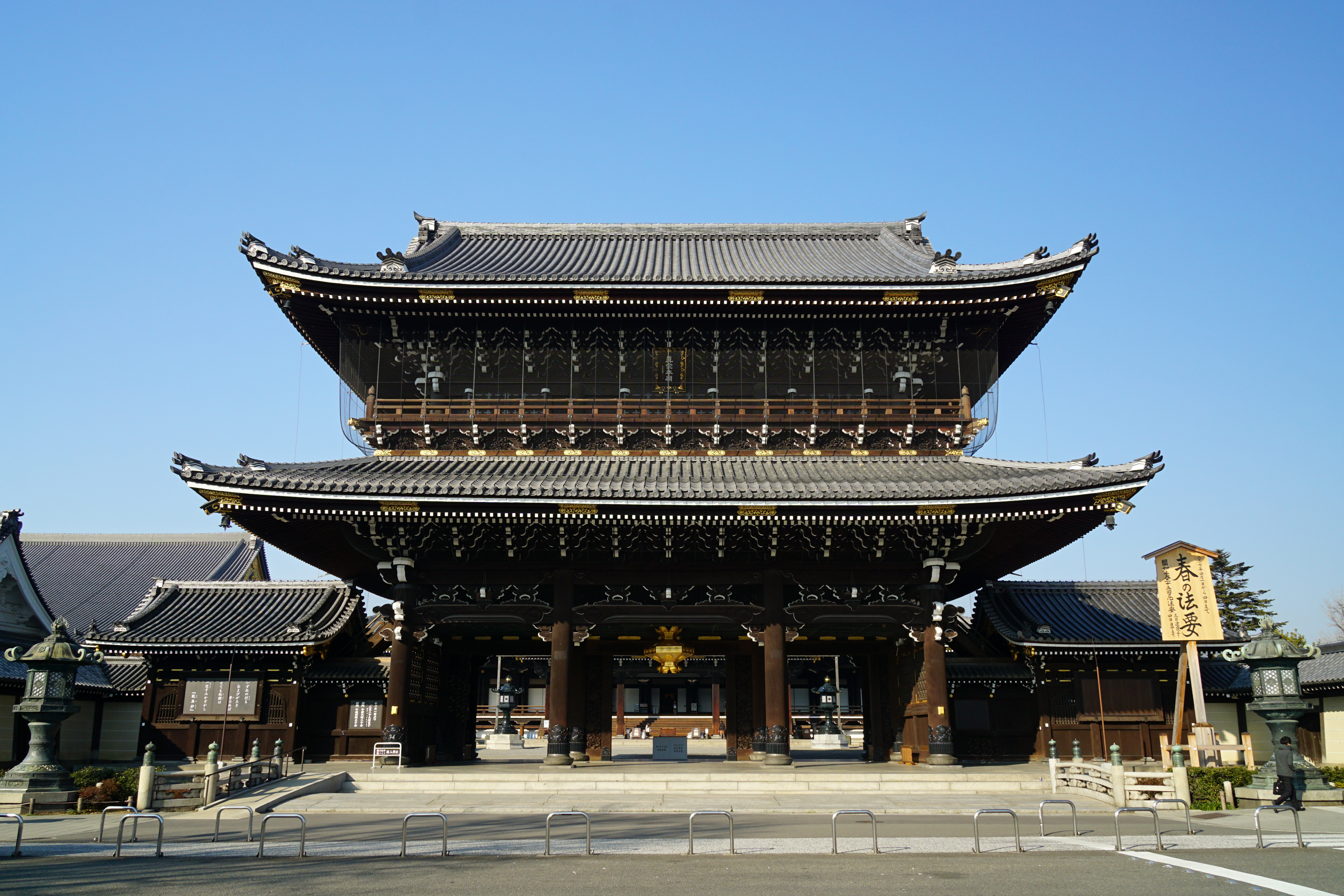
Goei-do Mon, built in 1911, width 31 metres (102 ft) and height 27 metres (89 ft); 59,387 roof tiles

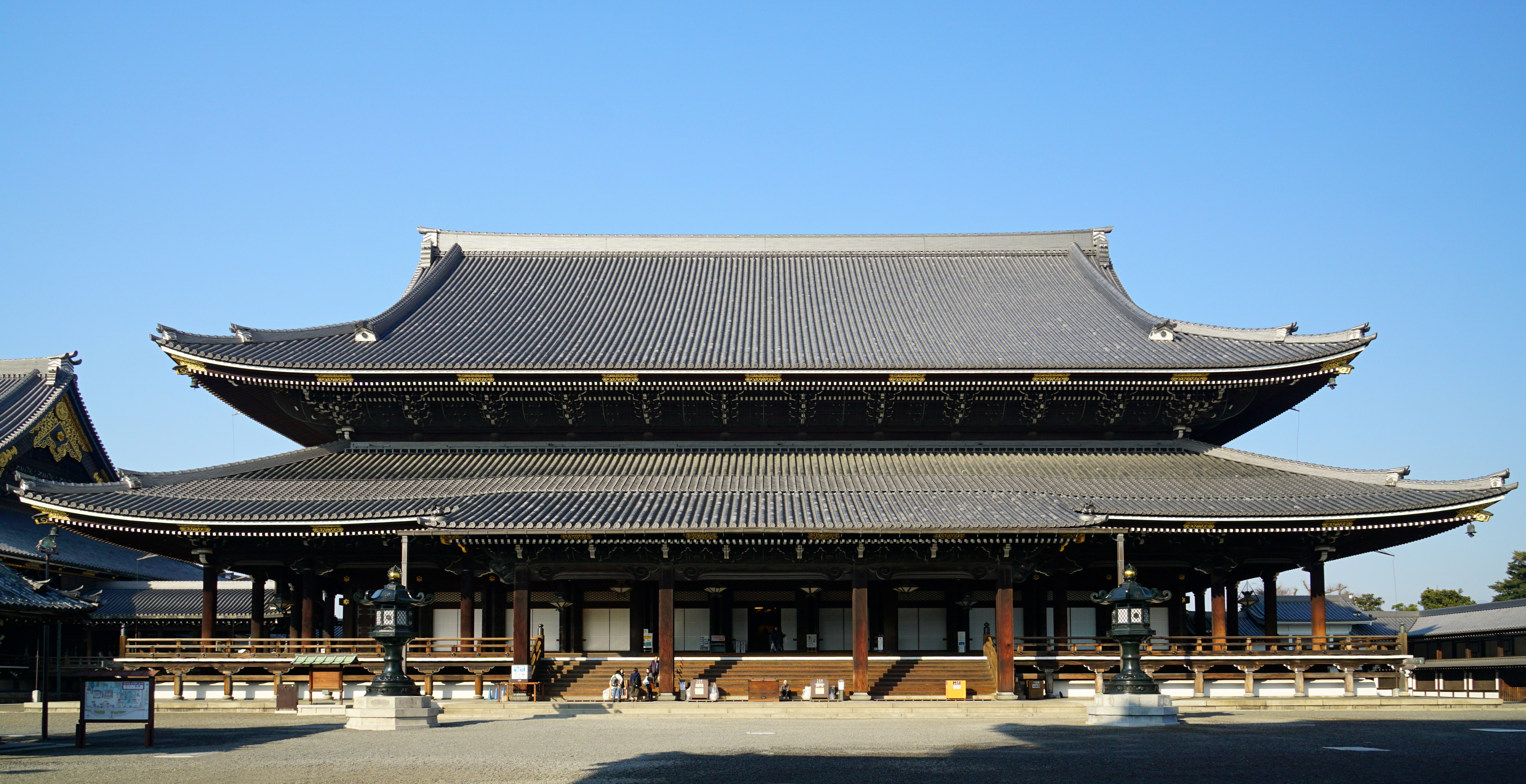
Goei-dō (kaisando)

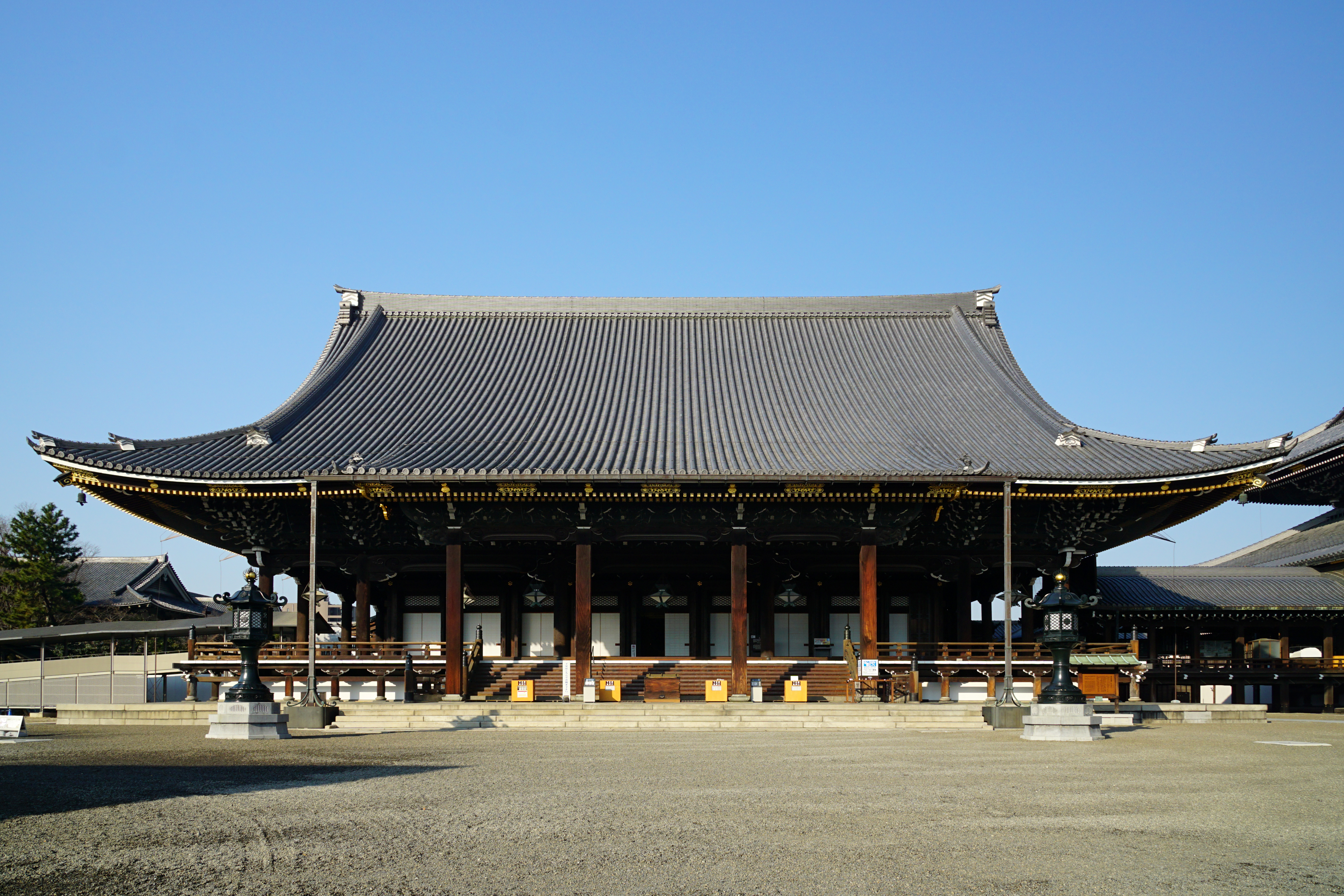
Amida Hall

== See also ==
- Glossary of Japanese Buddhism
- Pure Land Buddhism
