= Ōtani-ha =

Sub-sect of Jōdo Shinshū

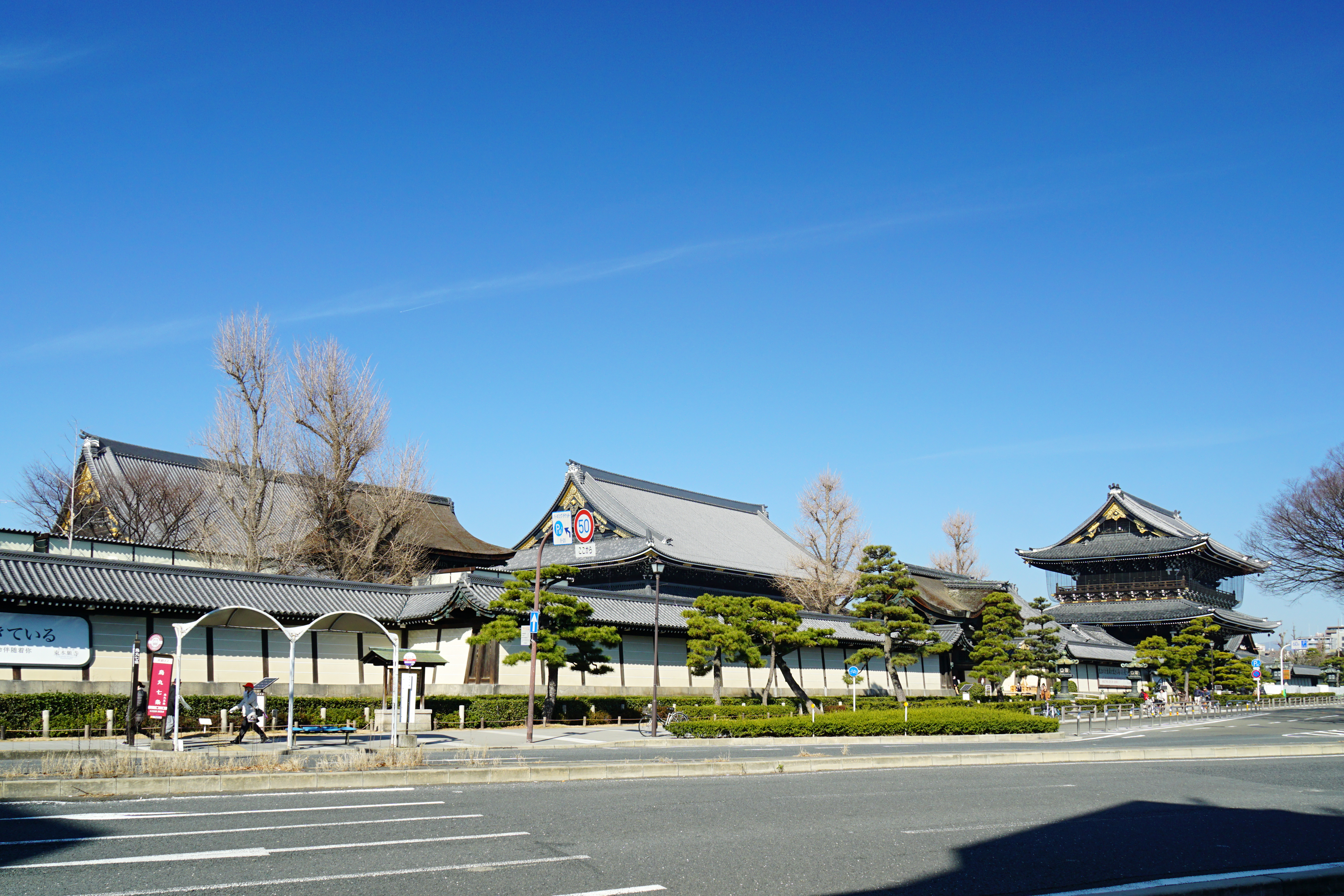
Higashi Honganji in Kyoto, the headquarters of the Ōtani-ha

Ōtani-ha (真宗大谷派, Shinshū Ōtani-ha) is a Japanese Buddhist movement. It belongs to the Jōdo Shinshū, sect also known as Shin Buddhism or True Pure Land. The movement has approximately 5.5 million members.

The headquarters of Ōtani-ha are in Kyoto, the mother temple is Higashi Hongan-ji. The historic Shōman-ji, Nagoya also belongs to it.

Ōtani University in Kyoto belongs to Ōtani-ha.

== See also ==
- Hongan-ji
- Pure land Buddhism
- Shinran

== Bibliography ==
- Suzuki, David A. (1985), Crisis in Japanese Buddhism : case of the Otani Sect, Los Angeles : Buddhist Books International, ISBN 0914910515
