= Kakushinni =

Daughter of Shinran, founder of the Jōdo Shinshū sect

Kakushinni (1224–1283) was the daughter of Shinran, the founder of Jōdo Shinshū (Pure Land) Buddhism and an important Buddhist cleric in her own right. She is considered de facto founder of the Honganji temple, which became one of Japan's most important religious institutions in subsequent centuries.

== Overview ==
Born near present-day Mito in Ibaraki Prefecture, Kakushinni was originally named Ogozen. Her birth year coincided with the period when her father, Shinran, began compiling his major work, the Kyōgyōshinshō. At age nine or ten, she relocated to Kyoto with her parents, Shinran and Eshinni.

During her youth, Kakushinni served as a lady-in-waiting in the household of Kuga Michiteru, whose brother was Dōgen, the founder of the Sōtō school of Zen Buddhism.

Kakushinni's first marriage was to Hino Hirotsuna, a distant relative and follower of Shinran. Historical evidence suggests she may have entered this marriage from a disadvantaged position, possibly as a younger wife among several, with limited material resources. She gave birth to her first son, Kakue (later known by his Buddhist name; 1239–1307), likely while still in her mid-teens. When Hirotsuna died, probably while Kakushinni was in her mid-twenties, Kakue inherited no assets from his father's family. Unable to claim any of Hirotsuna's wealth, Kakushinni returned with her young son to live with her parents.

During this period, young Kakue spent time with his grandfather Shinran, learning the fundamentals of Nembutsu practice before eventually entering Shōren-in, a Tendai temple in Kyoto.

Kakushinni devoted herself to caring for her father during his final years. When Shinran died on January 16, 1263, at age ninety, she expressed concern to her mother that his passing had been uneventful, as people of that era expected miraculous signs at the death of important religious figures. Eshinni reassured her daughter that Shinran's birth in the Pure Land was certain due to his complete faith in Amida Buddha's Vow.

=== Establishment of the Honganji ===
Three years after Shinran's death, Kakushinni remarried, this time to Ononomiya Zennen, a property owner in Kyoto. They had at least two sons, including one named Yuizen, born when Kakushinni was forty-two. Around 1272, she led an initiative to establish a memorial chapel (mieidō) for Shinran, securing financial support from his followers in the Kantō region. The chapel was constructed on land owned by Zennen, and Shinran's ashes were transferred there from their original interment site at Ōtani in Higashiyama. A statue of Shinran was enshrined within, and the site became a pilgrimage destination. This structure, known as the Ancestral Hall, formed the nucleus of what would become the Jōdo Shinshū Hongwanji-ha.

When Zennen died in 1275, he bequeathed the property to Kakushinni, leaving her to decide which of her sons would inherit. However, Kakushinni made an unprecedented decision: rather than following patrilineal inheritance customs, she placed the land in the name of Shinran's community of followers in the countryside, establishing it as a sacred site belonging to the faithful rather than to her family alone.

This decision may have been influenced by the egalitarian principles of Shinran's teachings, which held that Amida Buddha's Primal Vow embraced all people regardless of class, gender, or education. Kakushinni's choice demonstrated both the independence that some medieval women exercised over their inheritances and her visionary understanding of Shinran's religious legacy as more significant than family succession.

Kakushinni did designate her descendants as caretakers of the chapel, but broke with tradition by naming Kakue rather than Yuizen as the first hereditary caretaker. She herself served as the first Rusushiki (Protector of the Ōtani Ancestral Hall) until her death in 1283 at age sixty. Kakue succeeded her as the second Rusushiki, followed by her grandson Kakunyo (1270–1351), who transformed the role from caretaker to administrator. The head of the Jōdo Shinshū Hongwanji-ha is now known as the Monshu or Abbot.

Despite relatively impoverished circumstances early in life, Kakushinni successfully leveraged her resources to create a viable and enduring religious institution. Together with her mother Eshinni, who provided unwavering support to Shinran during his life, Kakushinni established the organizational foundation that enabled the transmission of his teachings across generations. Both women exemplified the confidence, self-awareness, and active participation in religious and social affairs that characterized some women of the Kamakura period. Today, they are both considered to be the mother founders of the Honganji tradition.
