= Tsukiji Hongan-ji =

Buddhist temple in Tokyo, Japan

Tsukiji Hongan-ji 築地本願寺
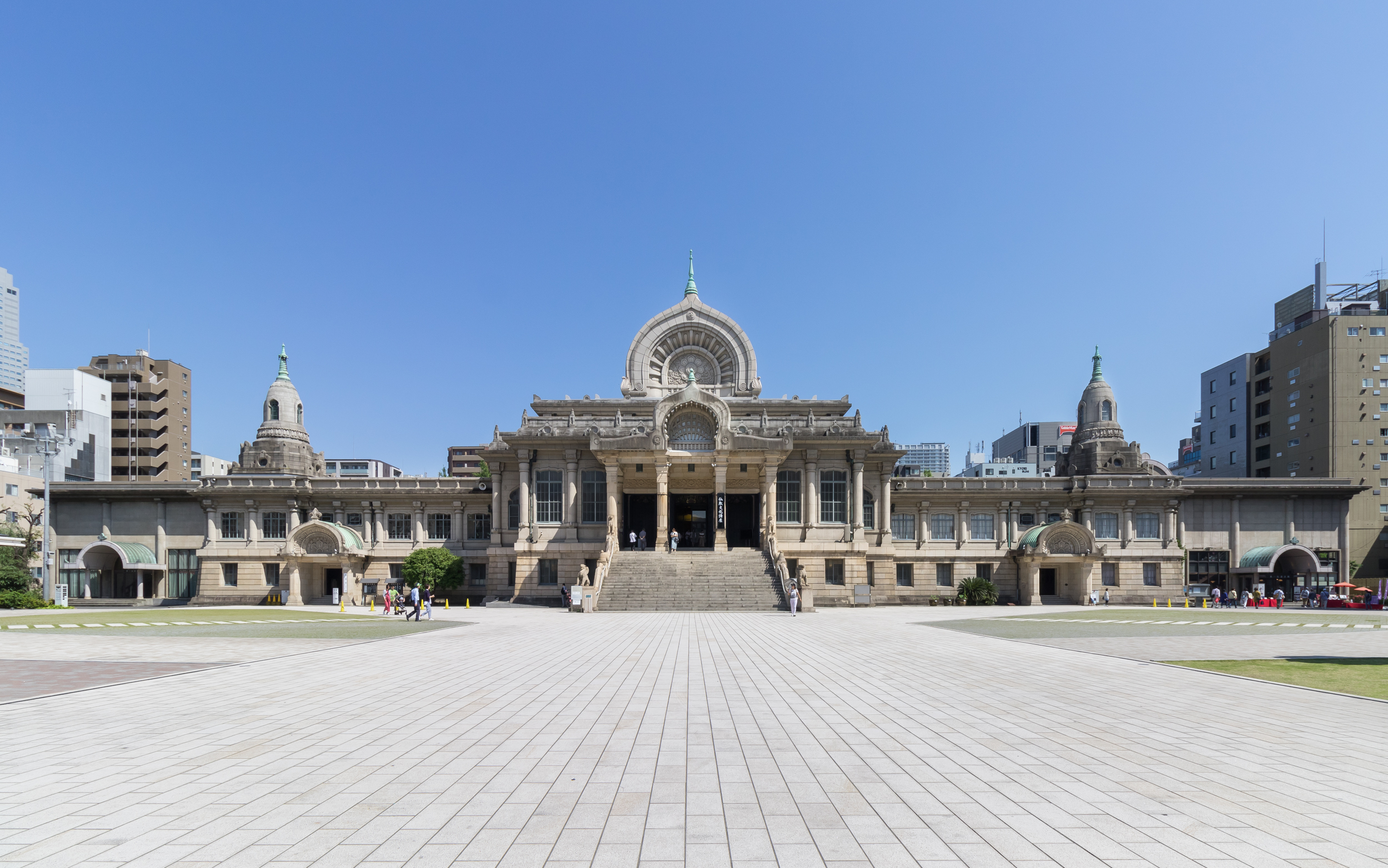
- Main hall

Religion
- Affiliation: Jōdo Shinshū Honganji-ha
- Deity: Amida Nyorai (Amitābha)

Location
- Location: 3-15-1 Tsukiji, Chūō-ku, Tokyo Prefecture
- Country: Japan
- Interactive map of Tsukiji Hongan-ji 築地本願寺
- Coordinates: 35°39′59.3″N 139°46′20.3″E

Architecture
- Founder: Jun'nyo
- Completed: 1617

Website
- https://tsukijihongwanji.jp/global/guide/

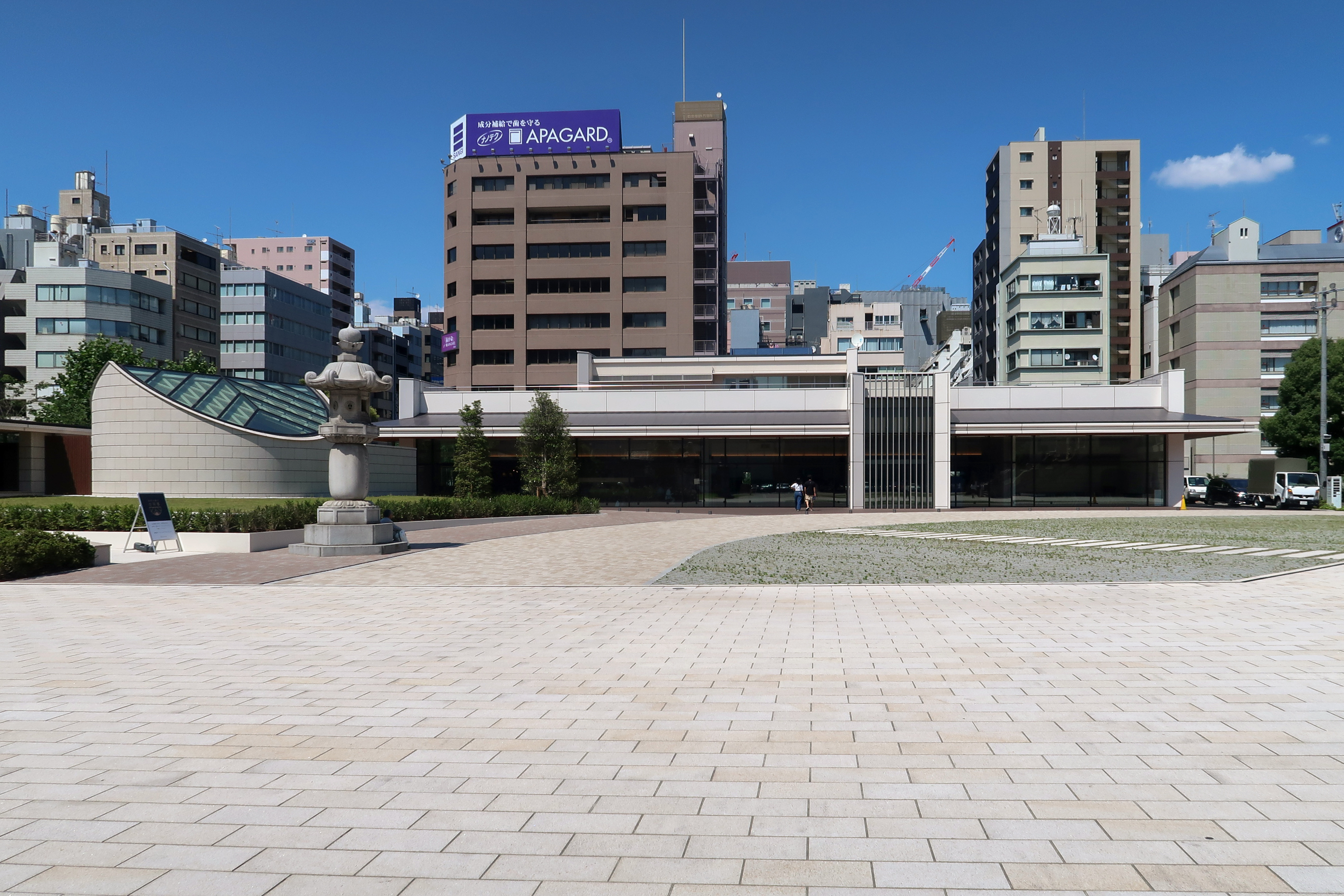
Goudoubo and information centre (2018)

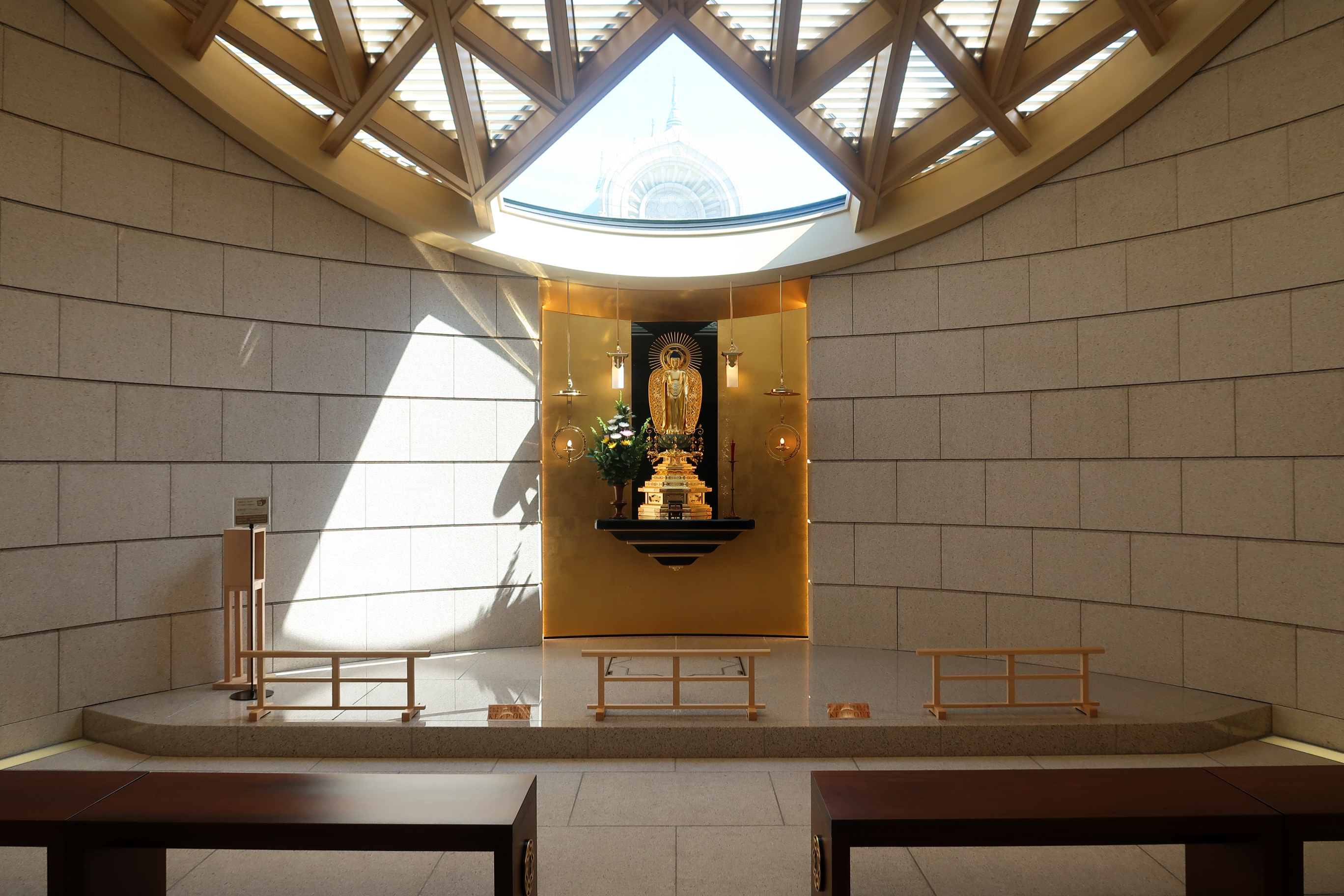
Goudoubo interior (2018)

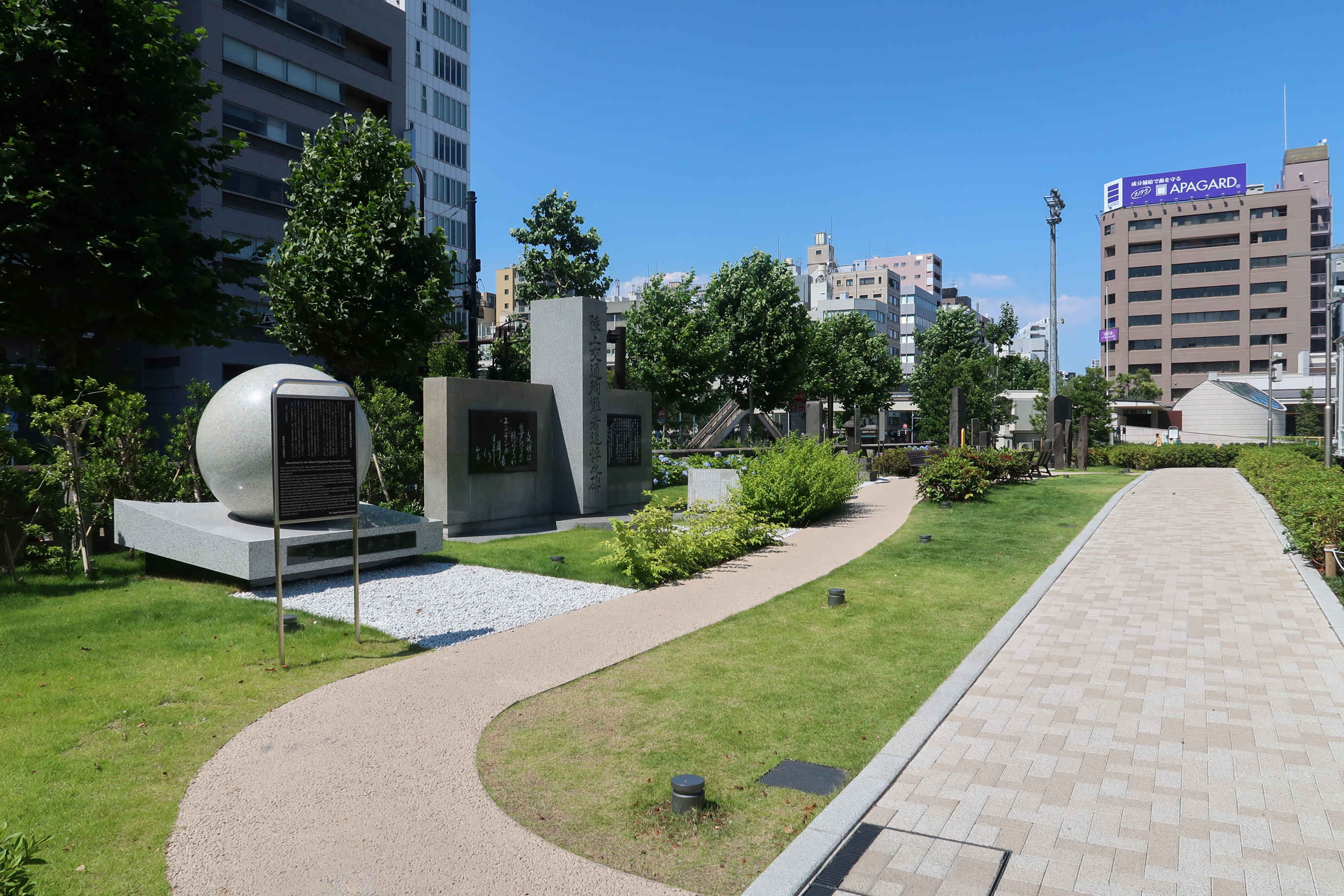
Memorial plaque (2018)

Tsukiji Hongan-ji (築地本願寺), officially romanized Hongwan-ji, is a Jōdo Shinshū Buddhist temple located in the Tsukiji district of Tokyo, Japan.

The temple is adjacent to Tsukiji Station on the Tokyo Metro Hibiya Line.

== History ==
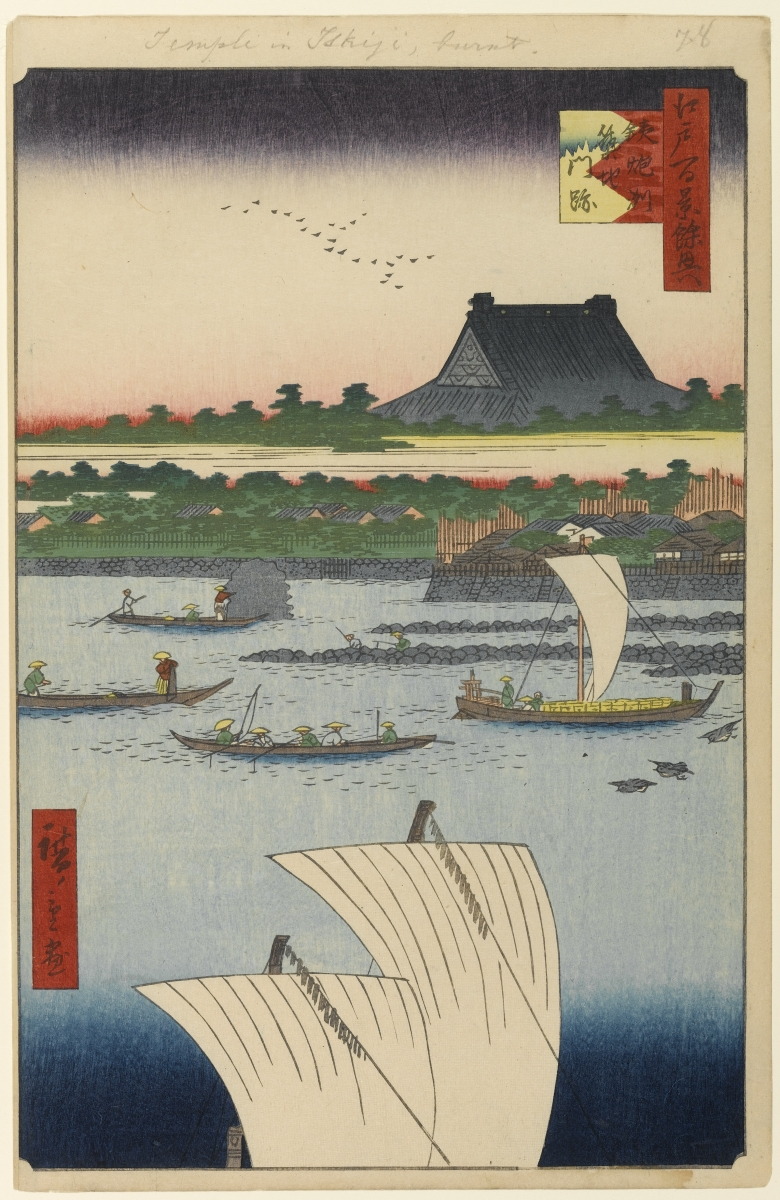
View of the Tsukiji Hongan-ji out the series One Hundred Famous Views of Edo by Hiroshige, 1858

Tsukiji Hongan-ji's predecessor was the temple of Edo-Asakusa Gobo (江戸浅草御坊), built in Asakusa in 1617 at the behest of the 12th monshu, Junnyo Shōnin.

The temple burned during a citywide fire in 1657, and the shogunate refused to allow it to be rebuilt in Asakusa due to a prior project there. Instead, the temple was moved to a new parcel of land being reclaimed along the Sumida River—today's Tsukiji. This land was said to have been reclaimed by Jodo Shinshu followers themselves who lived at nearby Tsukudajima. The name Tsukiji comes from the kanji characters meaning "reclaimed land". This new temple, named Tsukiji Gobo (築地御坊), stood until it was leveled by the Great Kantō earthquake of 1923.

The present Tsukiji Hongan-ji was designed by Itō Chūta of the University of Tokyo and built between 1931 and 1934. It is noted for its unique architecture, influenced by temples in India.

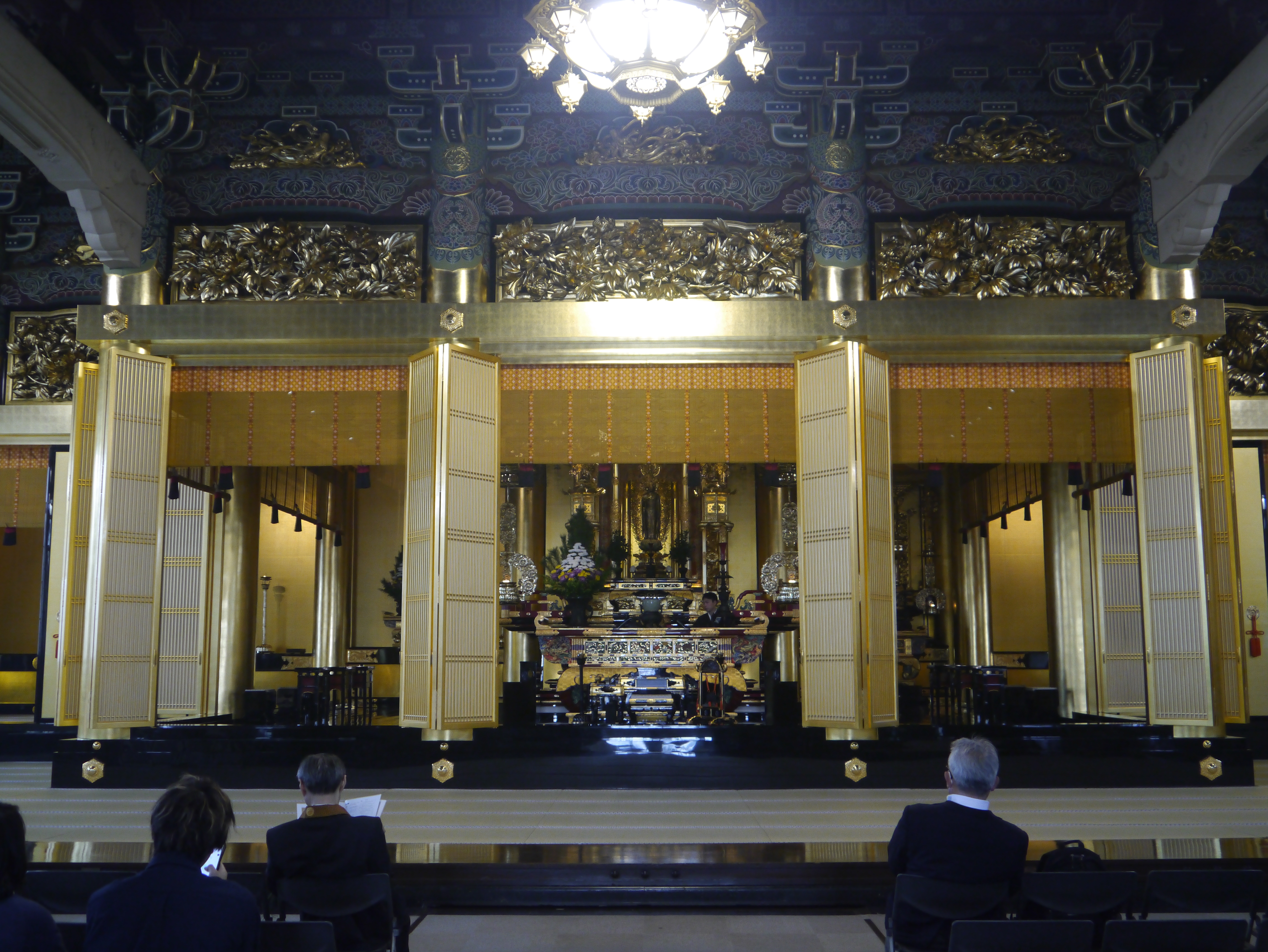
The main hall, or Hondō, inside of Tsukiji Hongan-ji

Hongan-ji is a pilgrimage destination due to its artifacts of Prince Shotoku, Shinran Shonin, and Shonyō Shōnin. Shonyō Shōnin (1911–2002), the 23rd monshu is enshrined to the left of the main altar in honor of his contributions to the spreading the Jodo Shinshu teachings abroad so that followers would not be in "name only".

The wake of Hiroaki Shukuzawa was held there on June 22, 2006, and a memorial to popular rock musician Hideto Matsumoto, better known as hide, can be found in the main hall itself, as the temple was the site of the musician's funerary ceremony in 1998.

== See also ==
- Hongan-ji Nagoya Betsuin, which has architectural resemblance
- Statue of Shinran, Tokyo
