= Eshinni =

Wife of Shinran, founder of the Jōdo Shinshū sect

- 恵信尼
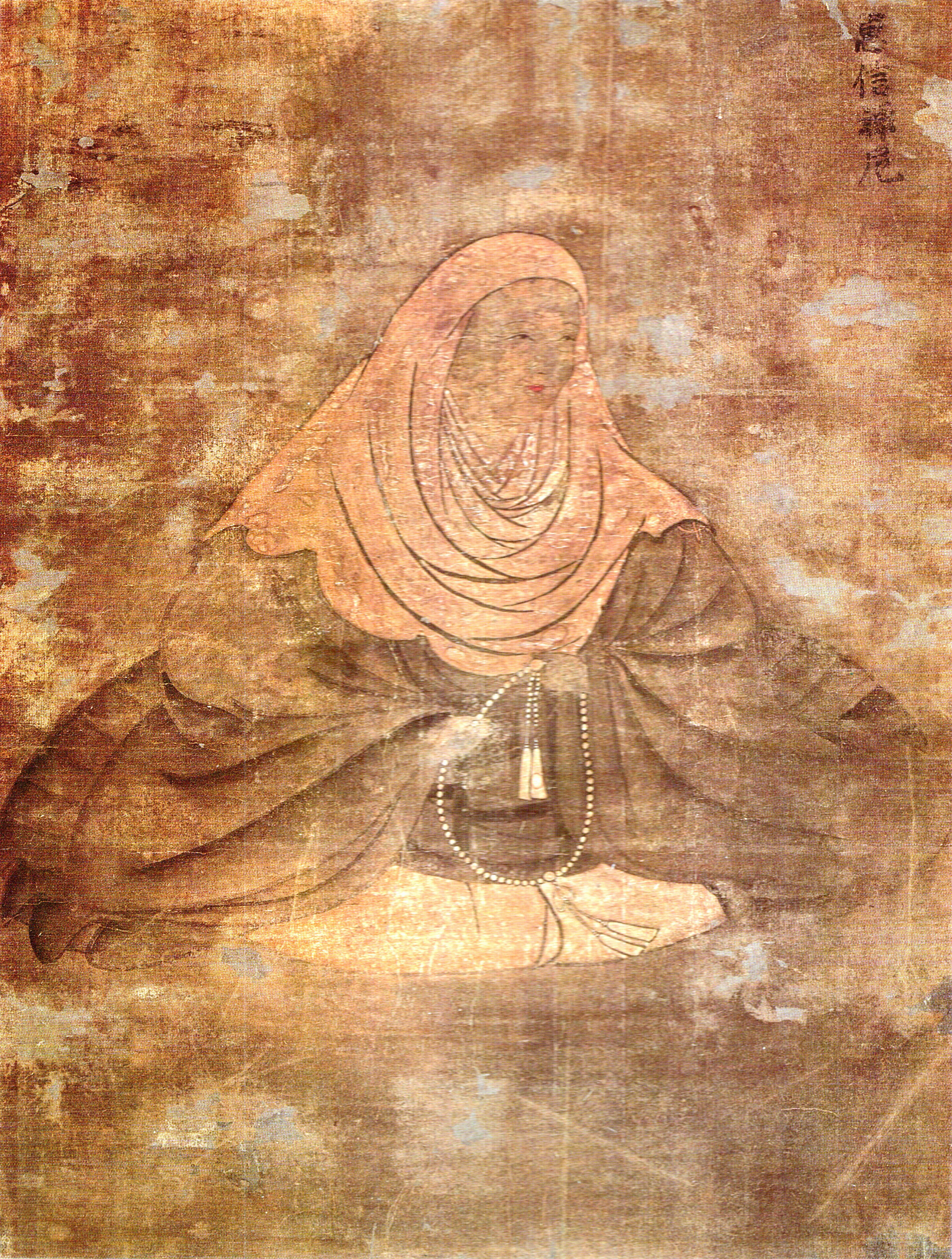

Personal life
- Born: 1182 Echigo Province
- Died: 1268 (aged 85–86)
- Spouse: Shinran
- Children: Kakushinni, Zenran, Others
- Parent: Miyoshi Tamenori (father)
- Era: Heian period, Kamakura period

Religious life
- Religion: Buddhism
- School: Jōdo Shinshū

Eshinni (恵信尼, 1182–1268) was a woman who lived in the Kamakura Period and was the wife of Shinran, founder of the Jōdo Shinshū sect of Japanese Buddhism. All that is known about Eshinni comes from the letters she wrote to her daughter, Kakushinni, during her final years. They are now preserved at Hongan-ji temple in Kyoto.

== Biography ==
=== Early life ===
Eshinni was born in Echigo province (now Niigata prefecture), likely to a family of some status based on her literary ability and handwriting as seen in the letters she wrote to her daughter.

=== Marriage ===
Around 1210, Shinran Shonin and Eshinni got married and settled in Echigo, where he had been exiled since 1207. Sometime between 1212 and 1219, they relocated to the Kanto region, and at about 1233, they returned to Kyoto with some of their children. Eshinni was also a landowner. This made it possible for her and Shinran Shonin to survive and raise a family while Shinran Shonin worked to spread the Nembutsu teaching which Honen Shonin had imparted on him.

=== Later years ===
Eshinni lived in Kyoto with Shinran Shonin until around 1254; then she was forced to return to Echigo to take care of her property. Eshinni was seventy-three years old at the time. She left her eighty-two-year-old husband in the care of their youngest daughter, Kakushinni.
