= Statue of Shinran, Tokyo =

Sculpture in Tokyo, Japan

Statue of Shinran
- The statue in 2019
- Subject: Shinran
- Location: Tokyo, Japan; 35°39′59.6″N 139°46′16.5″E

A statue of Shinran is installed outside Tsukiji Hongan-ji in Tokyo, Japan. It was donated by Seiichi Hirose (広瀬精一) who started to donate Shinran statues all across Japan in 1937 after losing his child and finding comfort in Shinran's teachings.
