= Monshu =

The Monshu (門主 or 門首), or keeper of the gate is a term used to Jōdo Shinshū Buddhism that refers to the spiritual leader of either the Nishi Hongan-ji branch, or the Higashi Hongan-ji branch. Traditionally these monshu were direct descendants of the founder Shinran and thus part of the Ōtani family.

Different kanji are used for the term through pronunciation is the same: 門主 by Nishi Honganji, and 門首 by Higashi Honganji.

Furthermore, in the related Jōdo Shū sect, the head of Chion-in temple is also called 門主, but this is pronounced monsu instead (as well as Jōdomon-su, "head of the Pure Land school").

These terms are derived from an earlier monzeki (門跡) still in use by some other Japanese Buddhist sects.

== History ==
The Monshu in Jōdo Shinshū Buddhism began as the guardian of Shinran's mausoleum, but grew to become the head of the Honganji sect. This position started after the death of the founder Shinran the founder, who had returned to Kyoto from the provinces after the exile of 1207 (i.e. the Jogen Persecution of 1207) was rescinded. Shinran returned with his daughter, Kakushinni (覚信尼, 1224-1281?), who cared for him until his death as well as a few disciples. After death, Kakushinni spearheaded the construction of a mausoleum (which became a temple named Hongan-ji in 1321) to hold Shinran's image and ashes at Ōtani, in Kyoto.

After Shinran's death, his grandson Nyoshin (如信, 1235-1300) was recognized as the heir to Shinran's teachings, but Shinran's daughter Kakushinni later installed her son Kakue (覚恵, 1239–1307), as caretaker of the mausoleum, who then chose his own son Kakunyo (覚如, 1271–1351) as heir to the office of caretaker. Due to Kakunyo's matrilineal descent via grandmother Kakushinni, as opposed to patrilineal descent, Kakunyo relied on his tutelage under Nyoshin to claim right of status as the next monshu over potential rivals. In time the small temple grew into what is now the Hongan-ji temples (both east and west).

== Lineage ==
=== Nishi Honganji-sect ===
According to the Nishi-Hongaji sect website, the list of Monshu is as follows:

Order	Names	Japanese	Dates Alive	Notes
1	Shinran	親鸞	1173-1263	Founder of the Jodo Shinshu sect, disciple of Honen
2	Nyoshin	如信	1235-1300	Grandson of Shinran
3	Kakunyo	覚如	1270-1351	Great-grandson of Shinran, Studied under Nyoshin, his father's cousin, and use this to affirm his claim to title despite his matrilineal descent.
4	Zennyo	善如	1333-1389	
5	Shakunyo	綽如	1350-1393	
6	Gyonyo	巧如	1376-1440	
7	Zonnyo	存如	1396-1457	
8	Rennyo	蓮如	1415-1499	Reformer of Jodo Shinshu-sect, instrumental in strengthening the influence of Honganji sub-sect vis-a-vis other Jodo Shinshu sects. His ofumi letters are still recited as part of liturgy today.
9	Jitsunyo	実如	1458-1525	Second son of Rennyo
10	Shōnyo	証如	1516-1554	Jitsunyo's grandson
11	Kennyo	顕如	1543-1592	Shōnyo's son. Kennyo administered Ishiyama Hongan-ji, cathedral fortress of the Ikkō-ikki during the Sengoku Jidai and one of the most fierce opponents of Oda Nobunaga. For his service, Toyotomi Hideyoshi granted land for the Nishi Honganji temple, while his brother Kyōnyo was later granted another plot of land by Tokugawa Ieyasu forming the Higashi Honganji temple.
12	Junnyo	准如	1577-1630	Son of Kennyo, he built the Tsukiji Hongan-ji temple in Tokyo and was recognized by the Tokugawa Shogunate as head of the new Honganji-ha subsect.
13	Ryōnyo	良如	1612-1662	
14	Jakunyo	寂如	1651-1725	
15	Jūnyo	住如	1673-1739	
16	Tannyo	湛如	1716-1741	
17	Hōnyo	法如	1707-1789	
18	Monnyo	文如	1744-1799	
19	Honnyo	本如	1778-1826	
20	Kōnyo	広如	1798-1871	
21	Myōnyo	明如	1850-1903	
22	Kyōnyo	鏡如	1876-1948	
23	Shōnyo	勝如	1911-2002	noteworthy for his efforts to help spread Jōdo Shinshū teachings abroad.
24	Sokunyo	即如	1945-	
25	Sennyo	専如	1977-	Current monshu as of writing.

=== Higashi-Honganji-sect ===
The lineage for the Higashi Hongaji (or Ōtani) sect is the same as above, but splits after the 11th Monshu, Kennyo, and continues as follows:

Order	Names	Japanese	Dates Alive	Notes
12	Kyōnyo	敎如	1558-1614	Brother of Kennyo, the 11th monshu. Due to his support for Tokugawa Ieyasu he was granted land for a second Honganji temple: the current Higashi Honganji.
13	Sennyo	宣如	1604-1658	
14	Takunyo	琢如	1625-1671	
15	Jōnyo	常如	1641-1694	
16	Ichinyo	一如	1649-1700	
17	Shinnyo	真如	1682-1744	
18	Jūnyo	従如	1720-1760	
19	Jōnyo	乗如	1744-1792	
20	Tatsunyo	達如	1780-1865	
21	Gonnyo	嚴如	1817-1894	
22	Gennyo	現如	1852-1923	
23	Shōnyo	彰如	1875-1943	
24	Sennyo	闡如	1903-1993	After Sennyo is a gap of 3 years until 1996 when new Monshu is installed.
25	Ōtani Chōken (Jōnyo)	大谷 暢顯 (淨如)	1930-	
26	Ōtani Chōyū (Shūnyo)	大谷 暢裕 (修如)	1951-	Current monshu as of writing.
