= Kyōgyōshinshō =

13th-century literary work by Shinran

Kyōgyōshinshō 教行信証
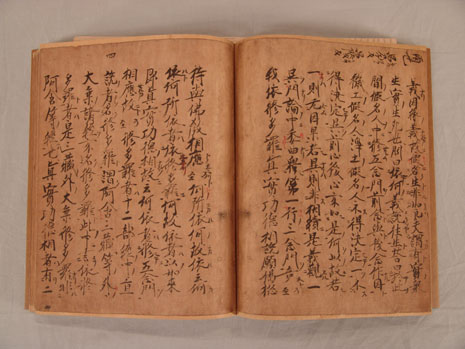
- Bandō manuscript (坂東本), c. 1235.
- Author: Shinran
- Original title: 教行信証
- Language: Japanese
- Subject: Mahayana sutras
- Published: 13th century, Heian era

Kenjōdo Shinjitsu Kyōgyōshō Monrui (顕浄土真実教行証文類), often abbreviated to Kyōgyōshinshō (教行信証), is the magnum opus of Shinran (1173–1263), the founder of the Japanese Pure Land Buddhist Jōdo Shinshū tradition. The title is often translated as The True Teaching, Practice, and Realization of the Pure Land Way in English. The work was written after Shinran's exile, and is believed to have been composed in the year 1224.

== Overview ==
The Kyōgyōshinshō presents Shinran's understanding of Pure Land doctrine and practice through a compilation of various relevant passages from Mahayana sutras and Pure Land treatises, interspersed by Shinran's own comments. In this way, the text defends Shinran's view of Pure Land thought.

Sutra sources include the Three Pure Land Sutras, the Nirvana Sutra, the Āvataṃsaka Sutra and the Mahaprajñāpāramitā Sutra. In addition to quotations from Buddhist sutras, Shinran often quotes numerous Pure Land patriarchs and scholars, who comprise the teaching lineage of Pure Land Buddhism. They include the Chinese Pure Land masters like Tanluan (476–554), Daochuo (562–645) and Shandao (7th-century), along with Shinran's teacher Hōnen. Furthemore, Shinran cites the 7th century Korean master Kyŏnghŭng's commentary on the Sutra of Immeasurable Life extensively. Indeed, the most widely cited scholars in Kyōgyōshinshō are Shandao, Tanluan and Kyŏnghŭng.

At the beginning of each chapter Shinran begins with the phrase "Compiled by Gutoku Shinran, Disciple of Shakyamuni." The name Gutoku or "Bald Fool" was the name Shinran gave himself after he was exiled from Kyoto.

== Chapters ==
The work is divided into six chapters, not including the Preface:

- Chapter 1 - The True Teaching (i.e. the Sutra of Immeasurable Life)
- Chapter 2 - Practice (i.e. nenbutsu)
- Chapter 3 - Shinjin, plus additional preface
- Chapter 4 - Realization
- Chapter 5 - The True Buddha and Land
- Chapter 6 - The Transformed Buddha and Land

=== Chapter 1 ===
This is the shortest of the six chapters, and mostly quotes from the Larger Sutra of Immeasurable Life to explain that encountering a Buddha is extremely rare and auspicious for all beings, and that Shakyamuni Buddha's appearance in the world was expressly to propound the Pure Land teachings.

=== Chapter 2 ===
This chapter delves in more detail the basis for Pure Land Buddhist thought namely:

- That the Buddha Amitābha made a series of vows to save all beings.
- That the most important vow is the 18th or Primal Vow to lead beings to the Pure Land if they recite his name.
- That the Buddha Amitābha sought to excel among Buddhas by providing a way out of suffering that all could practice.

Later the chapter quotes at length passages from the writings of Nagarjuna, Vasubandhu, Shandao and Hōnen as well as other Jodō Shinshū Patriarchs in chronological order. Shinran appears to be providing a progression of ideas among Buddhist writers that shows the evolution of Pure Land Buddhism. Among the topics discussed and cited are the recitation of the Amitābha's name, or nembutsu, the Path of the Bodhisattva, and the nature of the Pure Land itself.

Toward the end, Shinran turns toward the topic of tariki or other power and again quotes from various sutras and commentaries to draw his ideas upon. At the end of Chapter 2, Shinran writes his famous hymn, the Shōshinge or "Hymn of true Entrusting", which is a cornerstone of Jōdo Shinshū liturgy.

=== Chapter 3 ===
The preface to this chapter begins with Shinran discussing his belief in shinjin, or total entrusting to Amitābha Buddha, and how other schools focused on self-power are floundering in their efforts.

In Chapter 3 itself, Shinran discusses shinjin in much detail, and why it is central to Jōdo Shinshū practice. For Shinran, the total entrusting to Amitābha represented the most assured way for the common man to be reborn into the Pure Land, because rebirth would occur entirely through the compassion and wisdom of Amitābha. Again, Shinran quotes at length from both Tan-luan and Shandao who expounded the subject in detail in explaining the ideas of reciting Amitābha's name and entrusting one's self to the practice of it.

Shinran then discuss the nature of shinjin, and describes it as the "mind aspiring for great enlightenment" in a transcendent, crosswise manner, as opposed to the direct manner found in self-oriented practices. Here Shinran reiterates the point that if one abandons "sundry practices" and entrusts themselves to Amitābha for one thought-moment, they will attain a state of shinjin and their birth in the Pure Land will be assured.

Shinran then lists the benefits of practicing the nembutsu, or recitation of Amitābha's name. These include a great sense of joy, the praise of the myriad Buddhas, the protection of the myriad Buddhas, and a state of being "truly settled". The last section of Chapter 3 focuses on what defines people who cannot be saved by other Buddhist practices, who are seen as the main focus of Amitābha's Primal Vow.

=== Chapter 4 ===
In the comparatively short Chapter 4, Shinran begins by writings about nature of Amitābha as the Dharmakāya itself, and that those who attain shinjin are assured of Nirvāṇa. Noteworthy is the quote at the beginning of the chapter:

...Because they [who attained shinjin] dwell among the truly settled, they necessarily attain Nirvana... Supreme Nirvana is uncreated dharma-body [dharmakaya]. Uncreated dharma-body is true reality. True reality is dharma-nature. Dharma-nature is suchness. Suchness is oneness. Amida Tathagata comes forth from suchness and manifests various bodies...

After the introduction, Shinran writes about the idea, first posited by Hōnen, about Amitābha's intent to lead all beings to the Pure Land through smaraṇa, so that they can become Bodhisattvas. These Bodhisattvas will then return to the world to lead other beings along the Buddhist path.

Again, Shinran expands on these ideas by citing the writings of past Patriarchs of Pure Land thought.

=== Chapter 5 ===
Chapter 5 is devoted to the Pure Land of Amitabha Buddha, and birth there. Shinran writes that the Pure Land represents truth and reality, and upon birth in the Pure Land, one's delusions are immediately gone. As the Buddha Amitabha embodies the truth (symbolized by infinite light) his Pure Land and birth there represents awakening from delusions and defilements. This complements Chapter 4's assertion that shinjin is the same as Nirvāṇa.

=== Chapter 6 ===
Chapter 6 is the longest chapter of the Kyōgyōshinshō, and brings other Buddhist sects and practices into the context of Pure Land Buddhism as varying forms of skillful means. Other Buddhist writers in medieval Japan similarly tried to categorize Buddhist sects into a form of hierarchy, and here Shinran attempts to do the same. Shinran believes that in the era of Mappō, most of the original practices and teachings have died out or lost their efficacy, and so the only viable path left is the Pure Land path.

The end of Chapter 6, the Postscript, includes a brief autobiography, particularly during and after Shinran's exile from Kyoto in the year 1207. He writes about how he came to Hōnen's teachings in the year 1201 and feels he has remained his disciple ever since. He explains that his motivation is to share his joy in finding the Pure Land and hopes that others will take refuge in Amitābha as well. Shinran concludes the Kyogyoshinsho with a passage from the Flower Garland Sutra:

On seeing a bodhisattva
Perform various practices,
Some give rise to a good mind and others to a mind of evil,
But the bodhisattva embraces them all.
