= Zenran =

Japanese Buddhist monk. son of Shinran

Zenran (also Jishinbō, died 1292) was a Jōdo Shinshū monk of the Kamakura period. He was the son of Shinran and was the originator of a heresy for which he was excommunicated and disowned by his father.

== Teachings ==
Zenran was dispatched to the Kantō region to quell the appearance of radical nembutsu practitioners advocating for "licensed evil" (indulgence in evil deeds given the certainty of salvation.) There, he claimed to have received secret teachings from his father. In 1256, Shinran disowned his son and "called the gods to witness his avowal that there was no secret teaching given to Zenran". The Boki-e-ji portrays Zenran as having syncretized popular folk religion and Pure Land doctrine.
