= Bukkyo University Museum of Religious Culture =

Museum in Kyoto, Japan

- 佛教大学宗教文化ミュージアム
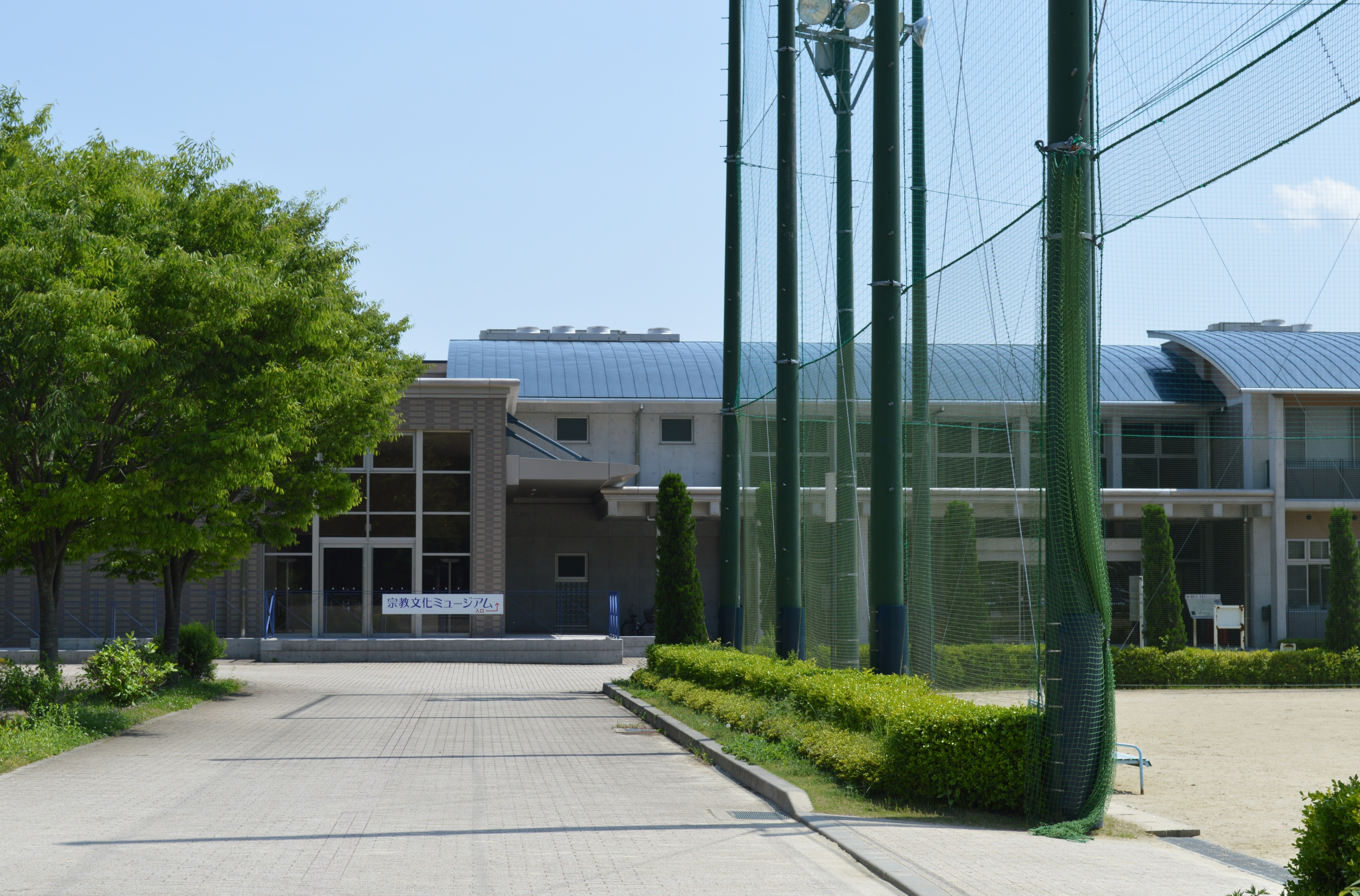
- Interactive map of the Bukkyo University Museum of Religious Culture area

General information
- Location: 5-26 Nishiura-chō, Sagahirosawa, Ukyō-ku, Kyoto, Kyoto Prefecture, Japan
- Coordinates: 35°01′28″N 135°41′16″E
- Opened: April 2008

Website
- Official website (in Japanese)

Bukkyo University Museum of Religious Culture (佛教大学宗教文化ミュージアム, Bukkyō Daigaku Shūkyō Bunka Myūjiamu) opened in Ukyō-ku, Kyoto, Kyoto Prefecture, Japan, in 2008. Affiliated to Bukkyo University, the museum's collection and displays focus on in particular Buddhist and Jōdo-shū religious culture and that of the Sagano area in which it is located, while the Religious Culture Theater stages performances of related intangible cultural heritage such as folk performing arts.

== See also ==
- Kyoto University Museum
- Ōtani University Museum
- Ryūkoku Museum
