= Kenkun Shrine =

Shinto shrine in Kyoto, Japan

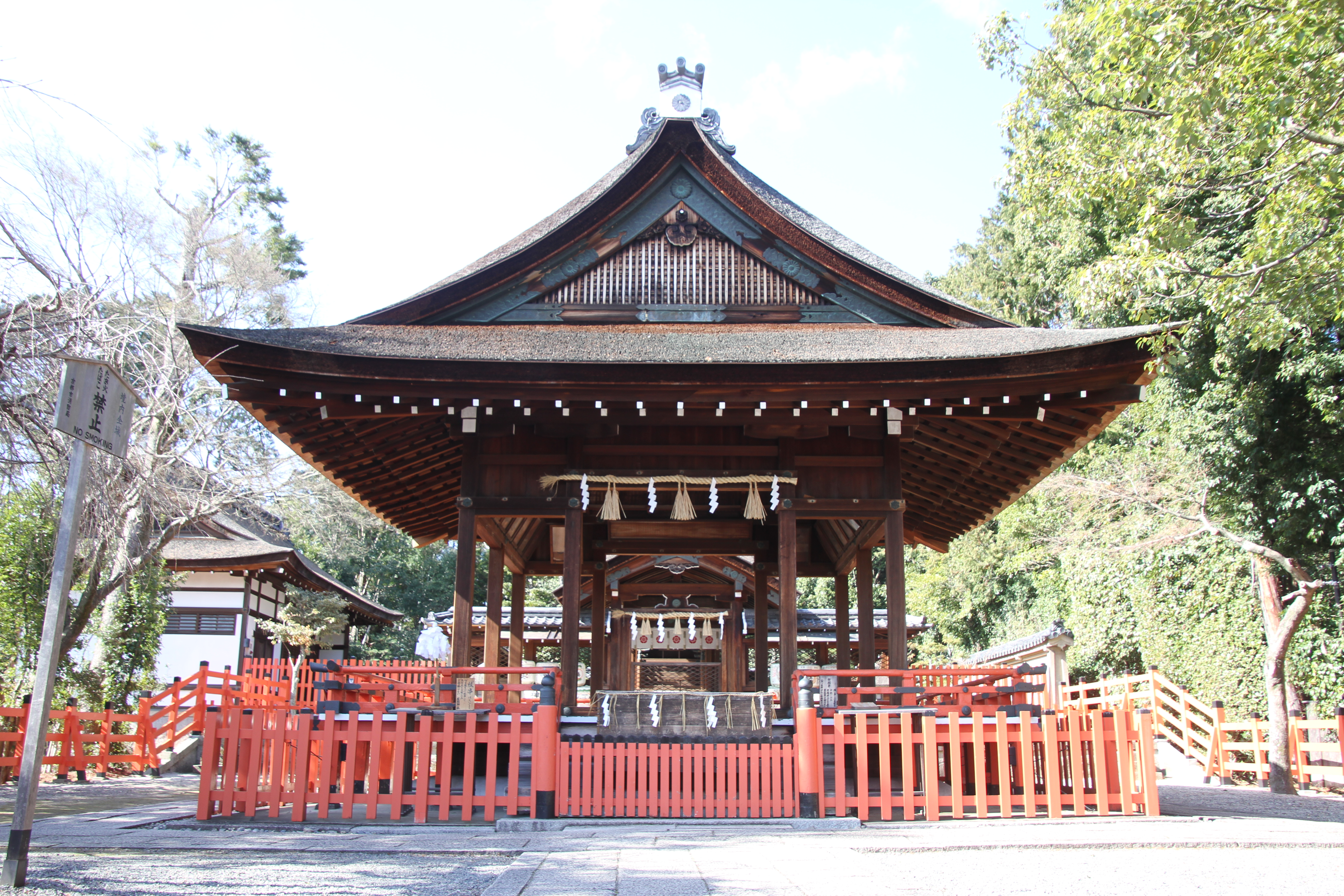
- Haiden of Kenkun Shrine

- Kenkun Shrine and Mount Funaoka Kenkun Shrine (Japan)

Religion
- Affiliation: Shinto
- Deity: Oda Nobunaga

Location
- Location: Murasakino Kitafunaoka-machi 49, Kita-ku, Kyōto-shi, Kyōto-fu
- Interactive map of Kenkun Shrine
- Coordinates: 35°2′19″N 135°44′35″E

Architecture
- Founder: Emperor Meiji
- Established: 1869
- Glossary of Shinto National Historic Site of Japan

Kenkun Shrine (建勲神社,, Kenkun-jinja) more properly known as Takeisao Shrine, is a Shinto shrine in the Kita-Funaoka-cho, Murasakino neighborhood of Kita-ku, Kyoto, Japan. It is located on the middle slope of Mount Funaoka. The main kami worshipped at this shrine is the deified spirit of the Sengoku period warlord Oda Nobunaga, with his son Oda Nobutada is enshrined as a secondary deity. It is one of many shrines that enshrined the ancestors of feudal domains, which were popular from the late Edo period to the early Meiji period in Japanese history. Mount Funaoka, on which the shrine is located, was a National Historic Site in 1968.

== History ==
On November 8, 1869, Emperor Meiji ordered that a shrine be built to honor Oda Nobunaga, who unified Japan and restored court rites during the Sengoku period, stating that "Japan was not invaded by foreign countries because of Nobunaga's unification of the country", and drawing a parallel to the recent Meiji restoration. The following year, on October 17, 1870, a shrine was constructed at the Tokyo residence of Oda Nobutoshi, former daimyō of Tendō Domain and Nobunaga's descendant, with another shrine constructed in the city of Tendō, Yamagata. On April 24, 1875 it was granted the rank of a special government-sponsored shrine (別格官幣社Bekkaku kanpeisha) under the State Shinto Modern system of ranked Shinto shrines. The shrine was relocated from Tokyo to Mount Funaoka in September 1880, initially at the foot of the mountain, and from 1910 to its current location on the mountaintop.The shrine grounds, located on high ground, offer a particularly good view of Mount Daimonji and Mount Hiei. The large torii gate is the largest unpainted torii gate in Kyoto Prefecture.

== Mount Funaoka ==
Mount Funaoka (船岡山, Funaoka-yama) is a 111.7 meter hill located in northern Kyoto city, which has been developed into Funaokayama Park. The park is the firsts urban park in Kyoto, but the land is leased by the city from the temple of Daitoku-ji. There is a theory that Mount Funaoka was used as a surveying reference point for the north-south axis when Heian-kyō was built, since it is located directly north of Suzaku-ōji, the central axis of the Heian period city layout. There is also a theory that it was worshiped as a sacred mountain even before the construction of the capital, because there is a rock outcrop near the summit, and that it corresponds to Genbu, one of the four cardinal gods which protect Kyoto per Chinese geomancy. However, both theories remain speculative, as no documentary or physical evidence has been found to support either theory. On the other hand, it was regarded as a burial site in the ancient capital, and is mentioned in this connect by Yoshida Kenkō in his Tsurezuregusa. The name also appears in chapter 231 of Sei Shonagon's The Pillow Book as the first hill which comes to mind for a Kyoto aristocrat. Mount Funaoka was the site of the execution of the defeated Minamoto no Tameyoshi and his children after the Hōgen Rebellion in 1156. In 1467, during the Ōnin War, Yamana Noriyuki, the governor of Bizen Province, and Isshiki Yoshinao, the governor of Tango Province, built Funaokayama Castle and barricaded themselves inside (the area including Mount Funaoka, which became the Western Army's base, has since been called "Nishijin"). After the death of Oda Nobunaga, Toyotomi Hideyoshi received permission from Emperor Ogimachi to build a temple with a mausoleum for Nobunaga called Tenshō-ji on Mount Funaokayama, but the plan was thwarted by Ishida Mitsunari and the mausoleum was never built. However, the area was regarded as a sacred place for Nobunaga throughout the Edo period.

== Funaoka Matsuri ==
The Funaoka Matsuri is a festival held every year on October 19 at Kenkun Shrine commemorating the day when Nobunaga first entered Kyoto in 1568. Young boys dressed in samurai armor portray Nobunaga's army as they marched into Kyoto to take control of the government.

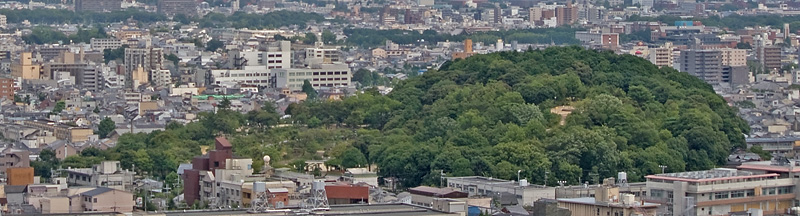
Mount Funaoka

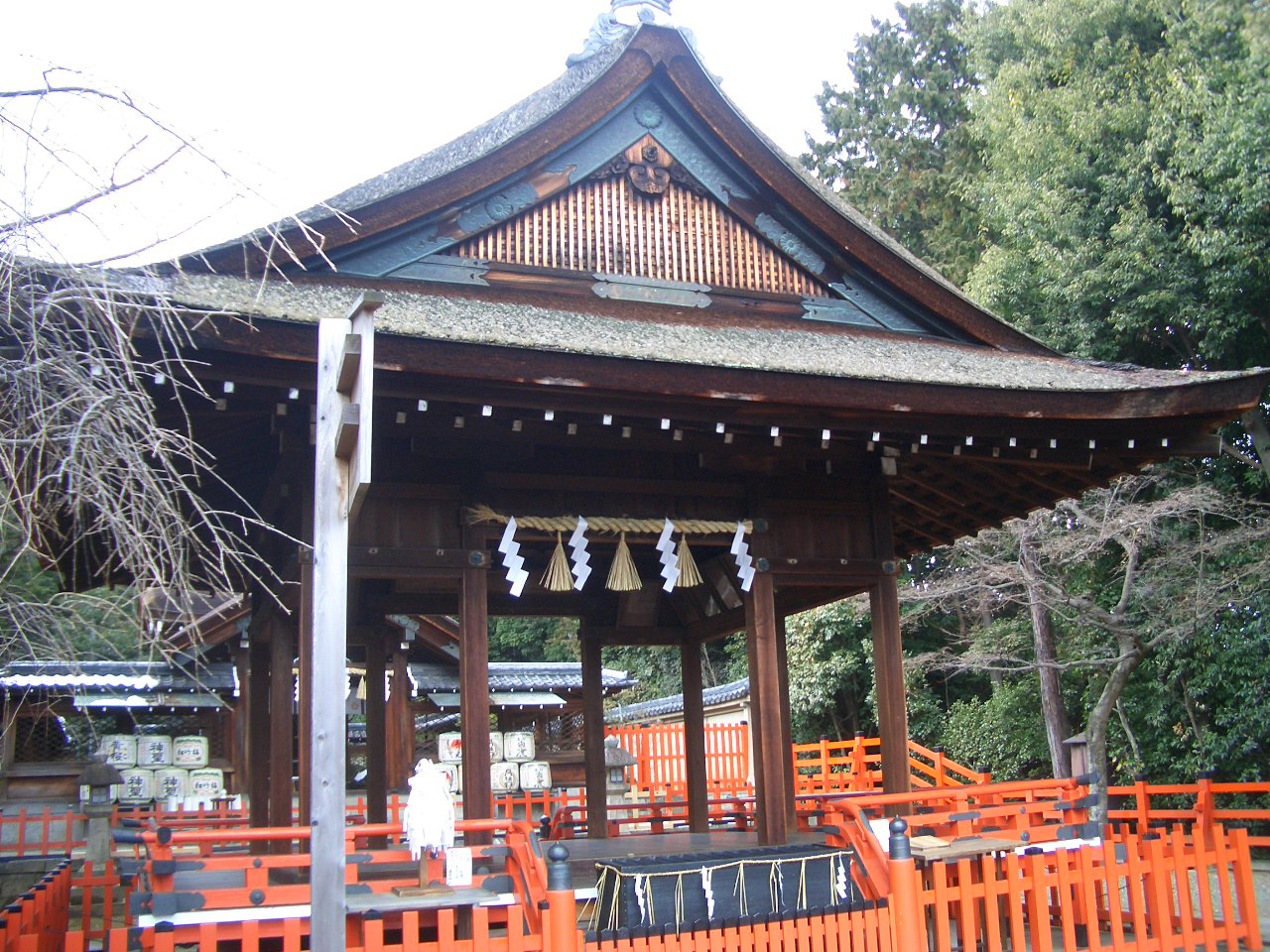
Kenkun Shrine

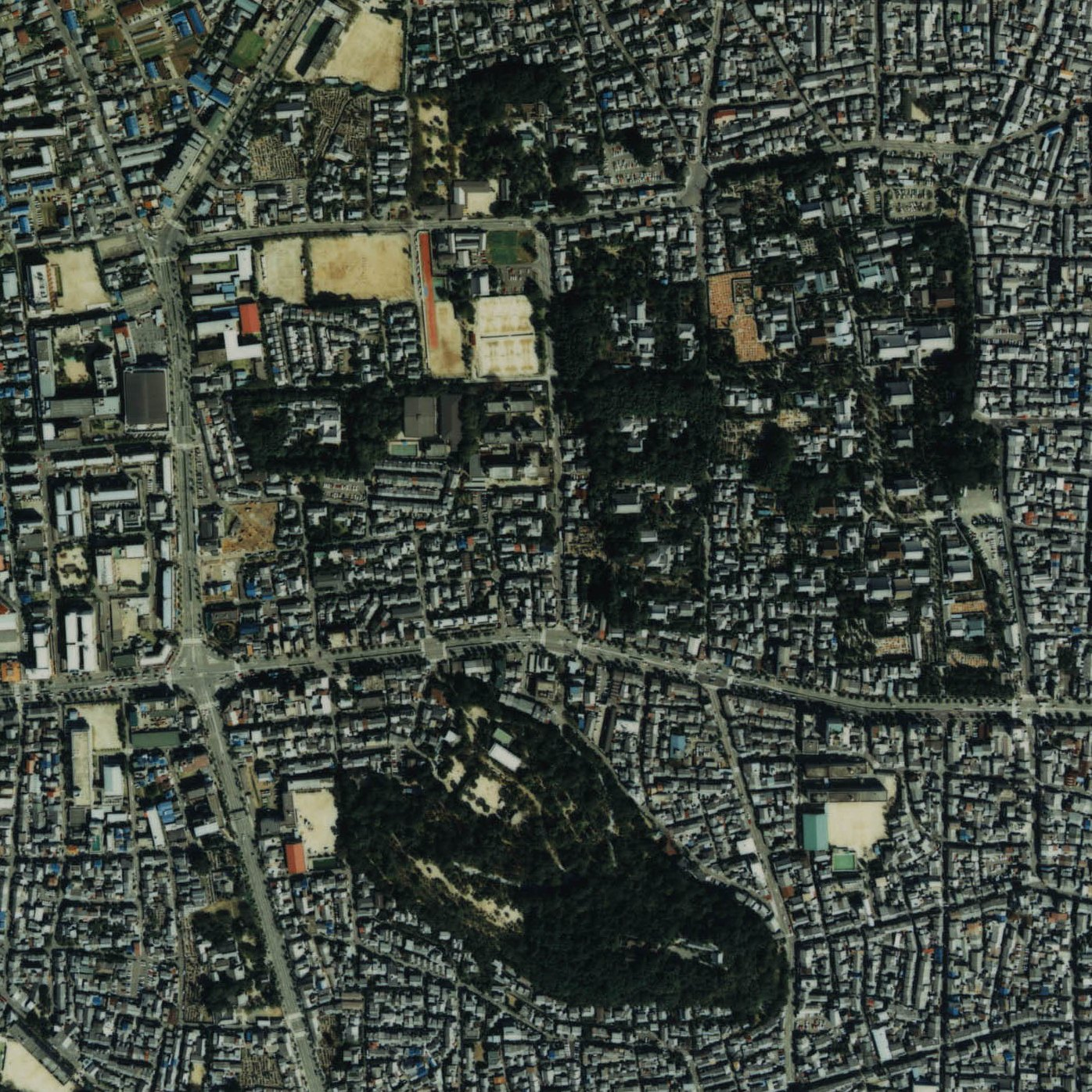
Aerial photo of Mount Funaoka

== See also ==
- List of Shinto shrines in Kyoto
- List of Historic Sites of Japan (Kyoto)
  - Black Tortoise
