= Kyoto University Museum =

Mosque in Kyoto, Japan

- 京都大学総合博物館
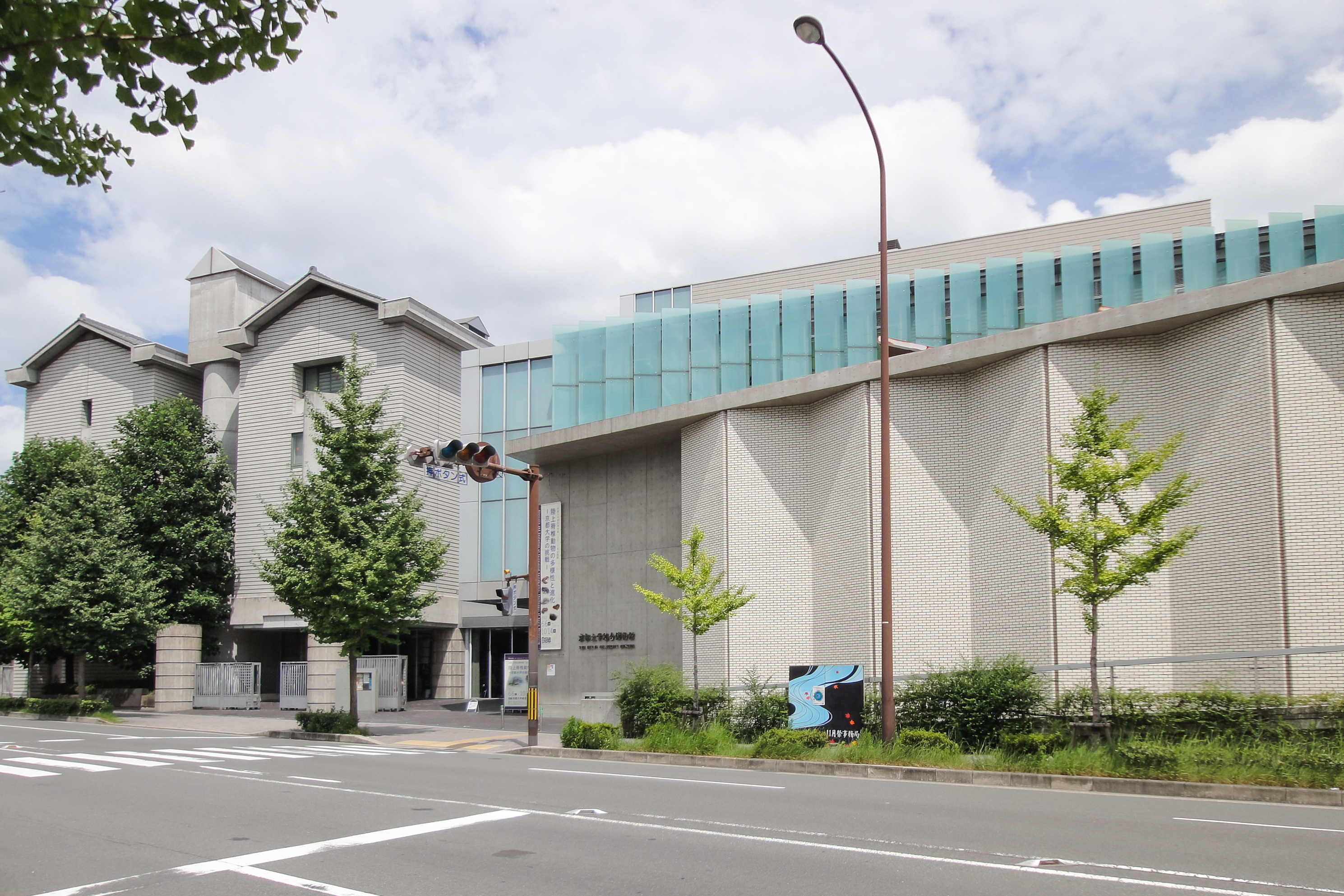
- Interactive map of the Kyoto University Museum area

General information
- Location: Yoshida Honmachi, Sakyō-ku, Kyoto, Kyoto Prefecture, Japan
- Coordinates: 35°01′38″N 135°46′45″E
- Opened: June 2001

Technical details
- Floor count: 2
- Floor area: 2,470 square metres (26,600 sq ft) (exhibition space); 13,350 square metres (143,700 sq ft) (total)

Website
- Official website

The Kyoto University Museum (京都大学総合博物館, Kyōto Daigaku Sōgō Hakubutsukan) opened in Kyōto, Japan, in 2001. It exhibits materials from the collection of some 2,600,000 objects built up by Kyoto University since its foundation as Kyoto Imperial University in 1897. Arranged in accordance with three main themes - natural, cultural, and technological history - the collection includes artefacts excavated from the Yamashina Nishinoyama Kofun (西野山古墓) that have been designated a National Treasure, several Important Cultural Properties, and materials from a number of excavations in China and Korea. The museum is part of the University Museum Association of Kyoto, a network of fourteen university museums in the city.

== See also ==
- List of National Treasures of Japan (archaeological materials)
- Kyoto National Museum
- Ōtani University Museum
- Ryūkoku Museum
- Doshisha University Historical Museum
- Bukkyō University Museum of Religious Culture
- Kyoto Museum for World Peace
