= Nishijin =

District in Kyoto known for textile production

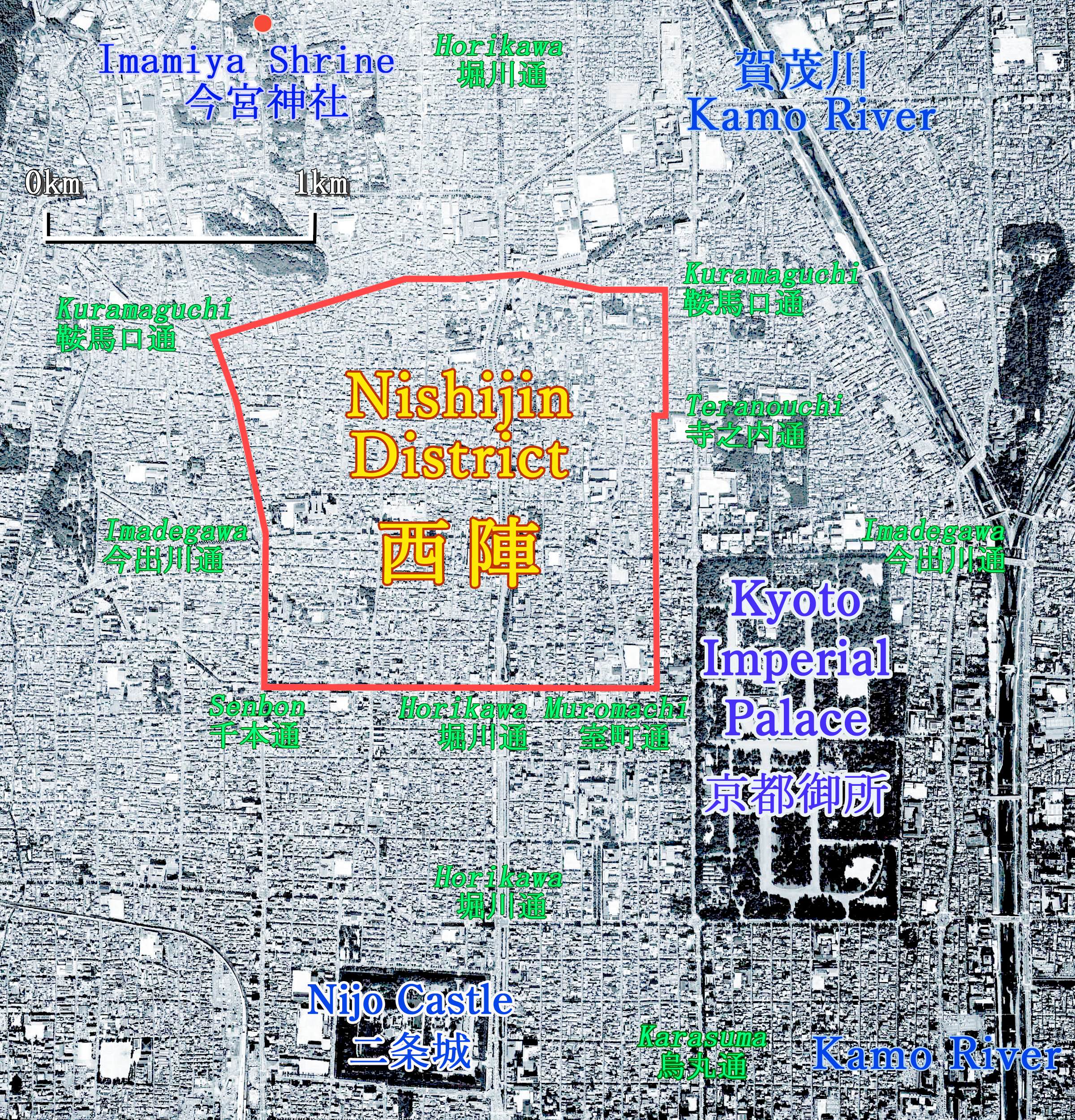
Nishijin district

Nishijin (西陣) is a district in Kyoto spanning from Kamigyō ward to Kita ward. Though it is well known as a district, there is no administrative area called "Nishijin". Nishijin is notable for its textile production, and is the birthplace of nishijin-ori, a high-quality, well-known silk brocade fabric, woven with colourful silk yarn and gilt or silver paper strips.

== History ==
In Kyoto, the textile production industry has existed since the 5th century, and it is said that weaving craftsmen gathered in Kuromon Kamichōja-machi (located around the southernmost portion of the modern Nishijin district) in the Heian period.

In the latter half of the Heian period, the textiles called ōtoneri no aya (大舍人の綾) and ōmiya no kinu (大宮の綾, "silk of ōmiya") were produced, and unique, thick and heavy textiles were used for the decorations of temples and shrines. The name Nishijin derives from Yamana Sōzen, a daimyō who fought in the Ōnin War (1467–1477); literally meaning "Western camp", others set up a camp in what would become Nishijin, located west from Horikawa.

After the Ōnin War, weaving craftsmen who had been scattered throughout the country returned to Kyoto and resumed their activities. At that time, the area became known as Nishijin.

There is a historic site of Nishijin between Imadegawa-Ōmiya and Imadegawa-Horikawa. (Note: A place name in Kyoto is sometimes coined by combining a South-North street name and an East-West street name. For instance, Imadegawa street is the East-West running street and Horikawa street is the South-North running street. The crossing spot of Imadegawa and Horikawa is usually called Imadegawa-Horikawa. In this way, the crossing spot of Shijō street and Kawaramachi street is usually called Shijō-Kawaramachi.) The Imamiya festival of the Imamiya Shrine is known as the festival of Nishijin.

In 2008, Nishijin woven products totalled roughly ¥81.8 billion, with 465 vendors. Weaving machines used in nishijin-ori production totalled 4,783 (3,600 power loom, 1,200 hand looms). Around 30,000 people were directly or indirectly engaged in the Nishijin weaving industry.

== Geographic location ==
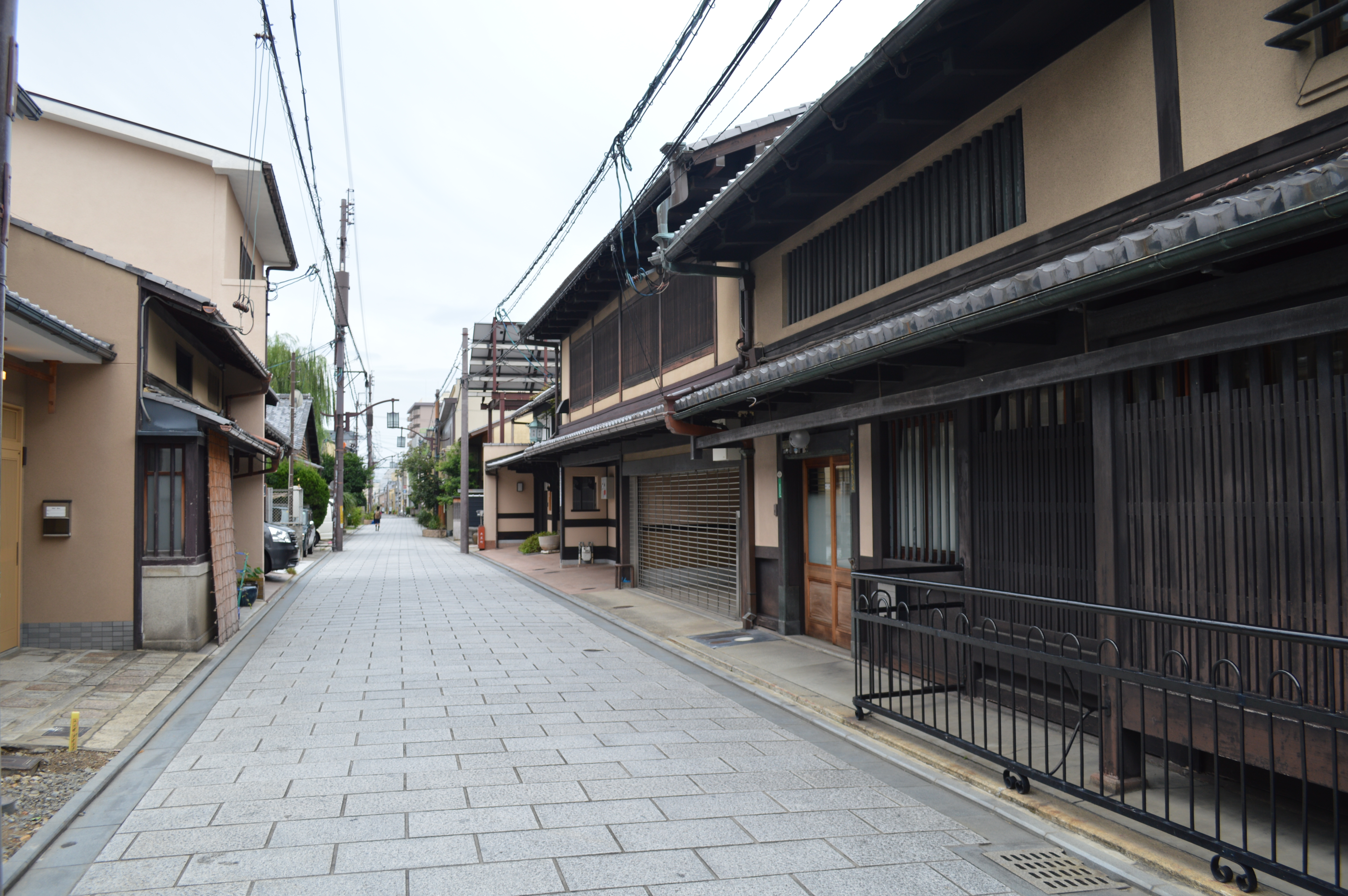
Daikoku-cho in Nishijin, Kyoto

According to the Kyoto Goyakusho muke Taigai Oboegaki (京都御役所向大概覚書, Guidebook for the Kyoto Town Magistrate's Office), compiled in around 1717, Nishijin was constituted of the area covered by the Horikawa street, Shichihon-matsu street, Kuramaguchi street, and Ichijō street (or Nakadachiuri street).

== Bibliography ==
- 高橋康夫「西陣の成立」『京都中世都市史研究』思文閣出版、1983年 (Takahashi, 1983)
- 本多健一「中世後期の京都今宮祭と上京氏子地域の変遷」『歴史地理学』51巻4号、2009年 (Honda, 2009)
- 本多健一「近世後期の都市祭礼における空間構造 – 京都の今宮祭を事例に」『人文地理』64巻1号、2012年 (Honda, 2012)
