= Otani University Junior College =

Coordinates: 35°2′29.8″N 135°45′32.3″E

- 大谷大学短期大学部
- Type: Private
- Active: 1950–August 2021
- Location: Kita-ku, Kyoto, Kyoto, Japan
- Website: http://www.otani.ac.jp/tandaibu/index.html

Otani University Junior College (大谷大学短期大学部, Otani Daigaku Tanki Daigakubu) was a private junior college located at Kita-ku, Kyoto in Japan. The college was opened in 1950 and closed in 2021. The remaining work was taken over by the Otani University.

== Courses available ==
- Department of Buddhism studies
- Department of childcare
