= Shirakumo Shrine =

Shinto shrine in Kyoto Prefecture, Japan

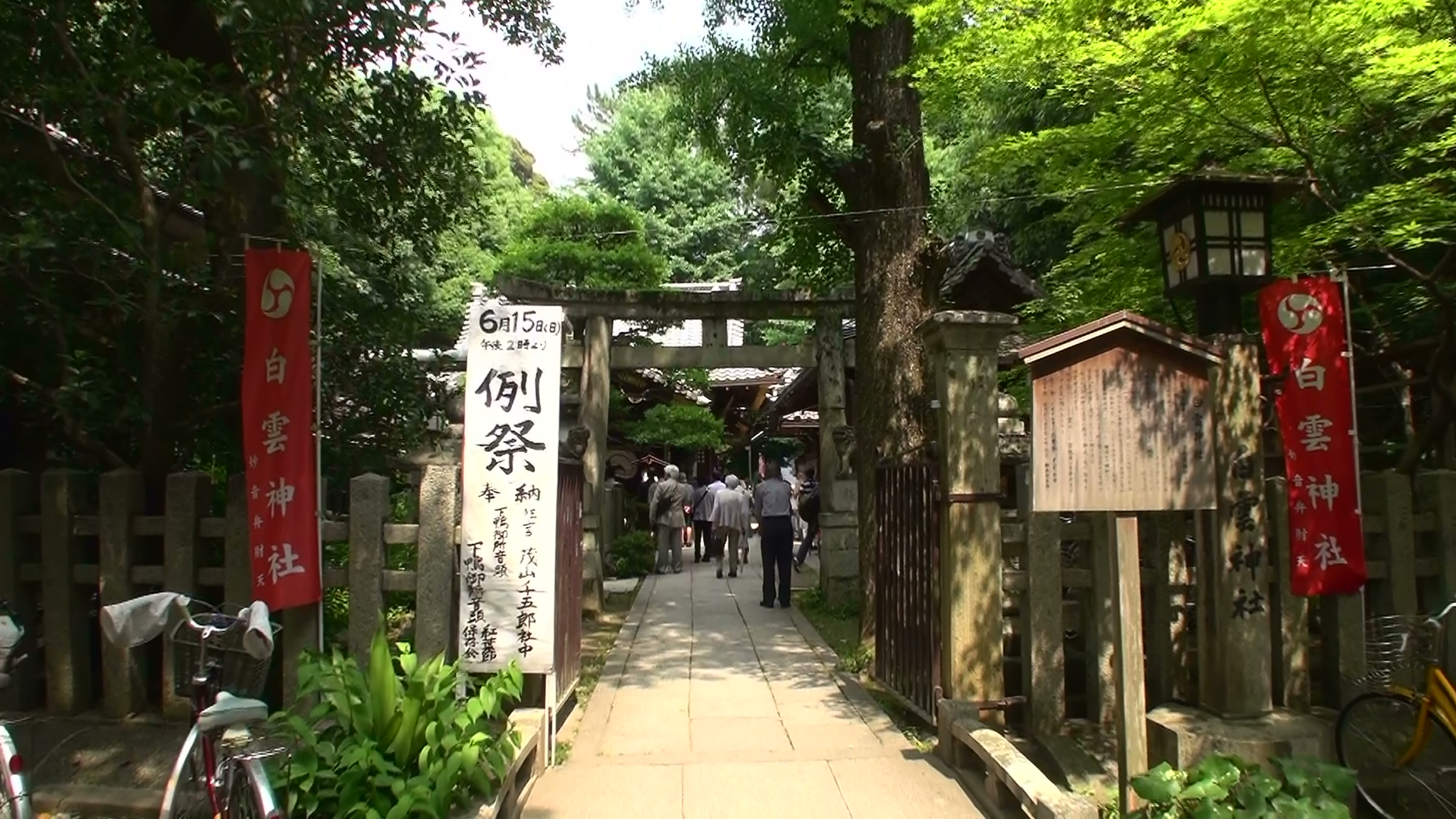
- The shrine in 2014

Religion
- Affiliation: Shinto

Location
- Location: Kyoto
- Country: Japan
- Interactive map of Shirakumo Shrine

Shirakumo Shrine is a Shinto shrine in Kyoto Gyoen National Garden, in Kyoto, Japan.

== See also ==
- List of Shinto shrines in Kyoto
