= Koryo Museum of Art =

Korean art museum in Kyoto, Japan

- 高麗美術館
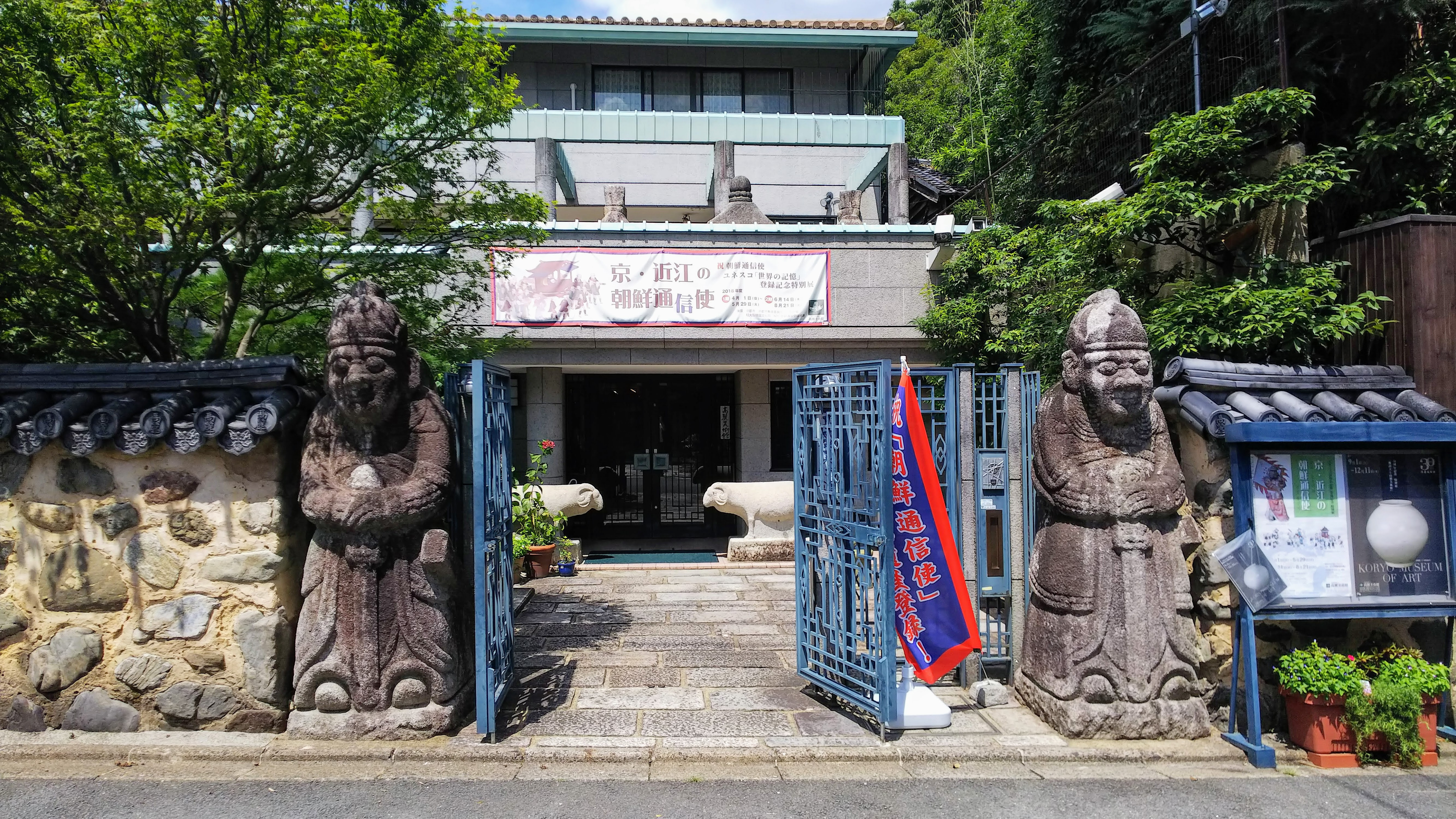
- Exterior of the museum (2018)
- Established: October 25, 1988
- Location: 15 Shichiku, Kaminokishi-chō, Kita-ku, Japan
- Coordinates: 35°03′15″N 135°45′03″E
- Type: Korean art museum
- Founder: Jeong Jo-mun
- Website: www.koryomuseum.or.jp/index.php (in Japanese)

The Koryo Museum of Art (高麗美術館, Kōrai Bijutsukan; Korean: 고려미술관) is a Korean art museum in Kyoto, Japan. It was opened on October 25, 1988.

== Description ==
According to the Encyclopedia of Korean Culture, the museum is the only one in the world outside of Korea that is exclusively dedicated to Korean art.

The area of the property is 400 square metres (4,300 sq ft). The building on the property has one underground floor and three floors above ground.

The collection comprises some 1,700 objects including Goryeo celadons, Joseon white porcelain, Buddhist art, Korean folk art, archaeological materials, and paintings, including Heron by Kim Myeong-guk with an inscription by Hayashi Razan. The bulk of the collection consists of pottery dating from the Unified Silla period (668–935) to the Joseon period (1392–1897).

== History ==
The museum was founded by ethnic Korean Jeong Jo-mun (정조문; 鄭詔文 1918–1989). Jeong's father was a former official in the Korean government before Japan colonized Korea. When Jeong was six years old (around 1924), his family moved to Japan. As a young adult, Jeong initially worked in difficult manual labor jobs, including as a dockworker.

He eventually became incredibly wealthy from running a pachinko business in Kyoto. He then began to collect Korean art. In 1969, he began publishing a quarterly magazine showcasing his relics. The magazine's final issue was its 50th, published in 1981. In them, Jeong made a point of juxtaposing a historical Japanese narrative, that Koreans were unenlightened and had little culture, with the beauty of the art. The magazine was well-received; an article in the Kyoto Shimbun once praised it and lamented the fact that Koreans had been viewed so poorly.

In 1972, Jeong and a group of historians began searching the entirety of Japan for Korea-related relics. Around 500 people became involved in the search. The relics acquired from this effort eventually became part of the Koryo Museum of Art's collection. Jeong converted his own home into the site of the museum.

== See also ==
- The History Museum of J-Koreans: Tokyo museum on the experience of Korean people in Japan
- Kyoto National Museum
- List of Goryeo Buddhist paintings
- Minhwa
- History of Japan–Korea relations
