= Nonomiya Shrine =

Shinto shrine in Kyoto Prefecture, Japan

Nonomiya Shrine (野宮神社, Nonomiya-jinja)
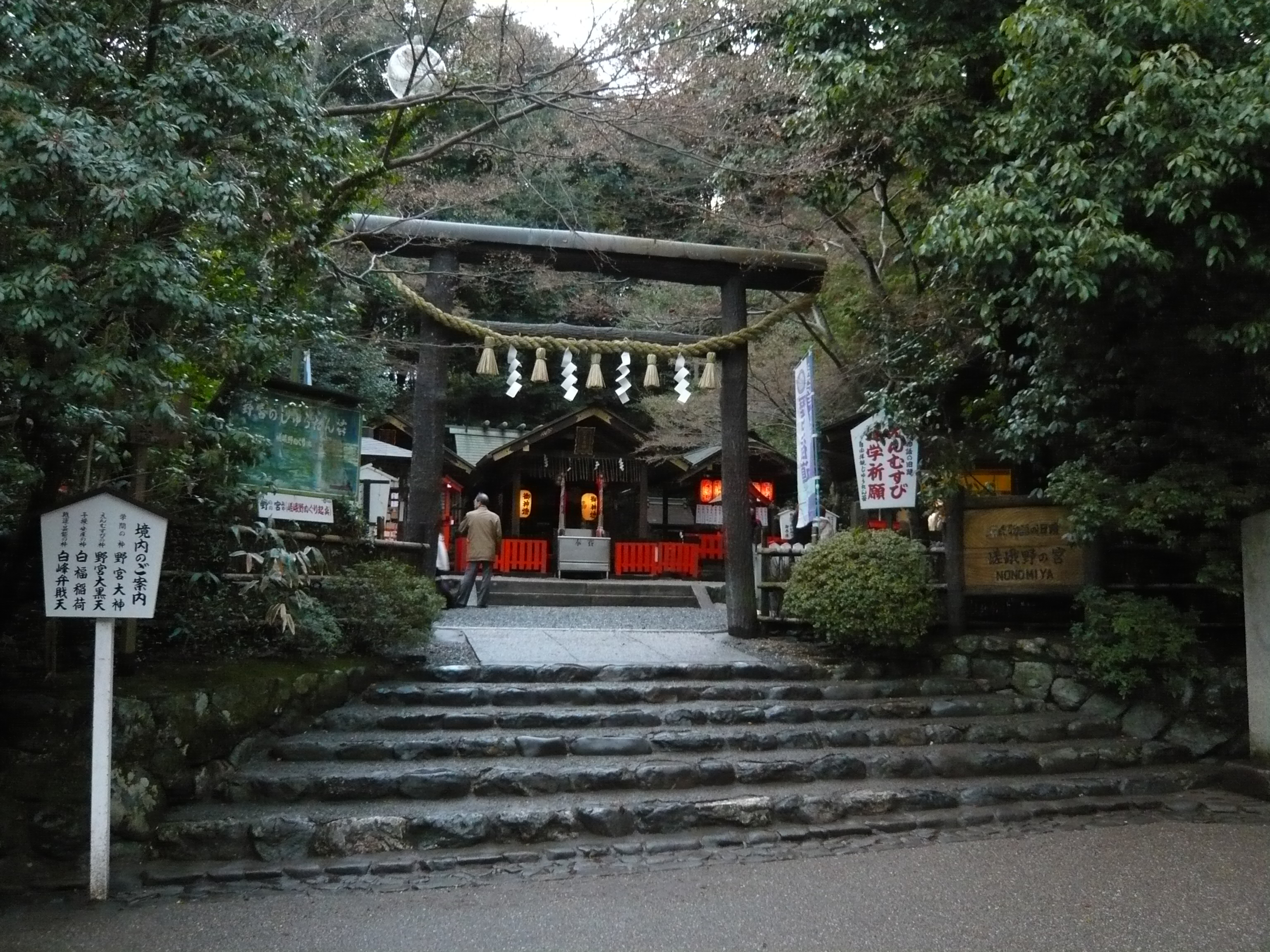
- The Torii gate at the front entrance of the Nonomiya Shrine in Kyoto, Japan

- Location within Japan

Religion
- Affiliation: Shinto

Location
- Coordinates: 35°01′04″N 135°40′27″E

Nonomiya Shrine (野宮神社, Nonomiya-jinja), or the Shrine in the Country, is a Shinto shrine in the Arashiyama district on the west side of the city of Kyoto, Japan, close to its bamboo forest. The specific site of the shrine has changed somewhat over time, as the location of the shrine was fixed anew by divination when a new imperial priestess was to undergo purification before traveling to take up her duties at Ise Shrine.

== Saigu procession ==
In the Heian period, successive imperial princesses Saiō stayed in the Nonomiya Shrine for a year or more to purify themselves before becoming representatives of the imperial family at the Ise Shrine in Mie prefecture. Contemporary annual processions recreate a scene from a picture scroll of the imperial court during the Heian period, starting from the shrine and continuing as far as the Togetsu-kyo Bridge, Arashiyama.

== In literature ==
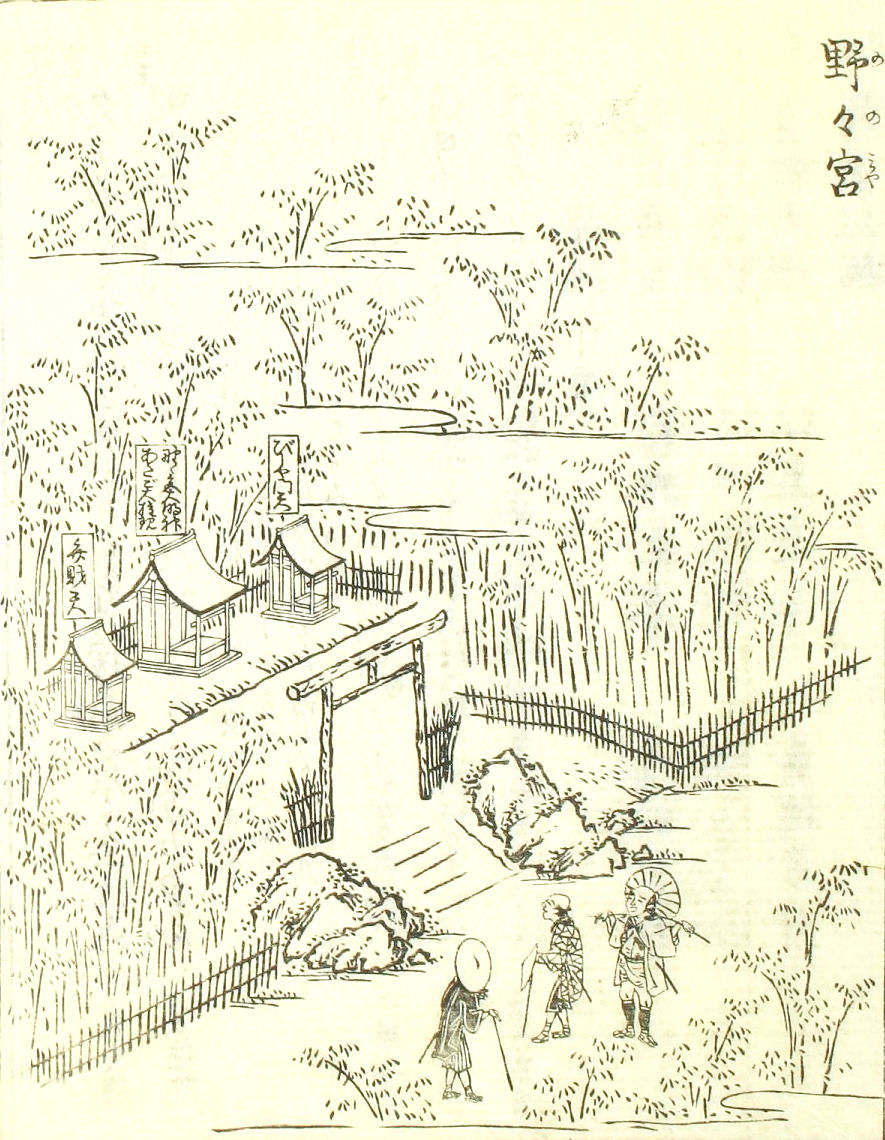
Nonomiya shrine depicted in a 1786 print of "Miyako Meisho Zue" (都名所図会)

Nonomiya Shrine appears in the tenth chapter of the Tale of Genji.

There are many plays and other works which are based on the narrative of Genji. In the Noh play, The Shrine in the Fields by Zeami, a scene features a priest praying when a girl enters; and, upon questioning, she tells the story of how, when Lady Rokujo was staying at Nonomiya with her daughter who had been appointed as the Ise virgin, Genji came to her.

== See also ==
- List of Shinto shrines in Kyoto
