= Keido Fukushima =

Japanese Rinzai Zen master, head abbot of Tōfuku-ji

Keidō Fukushima
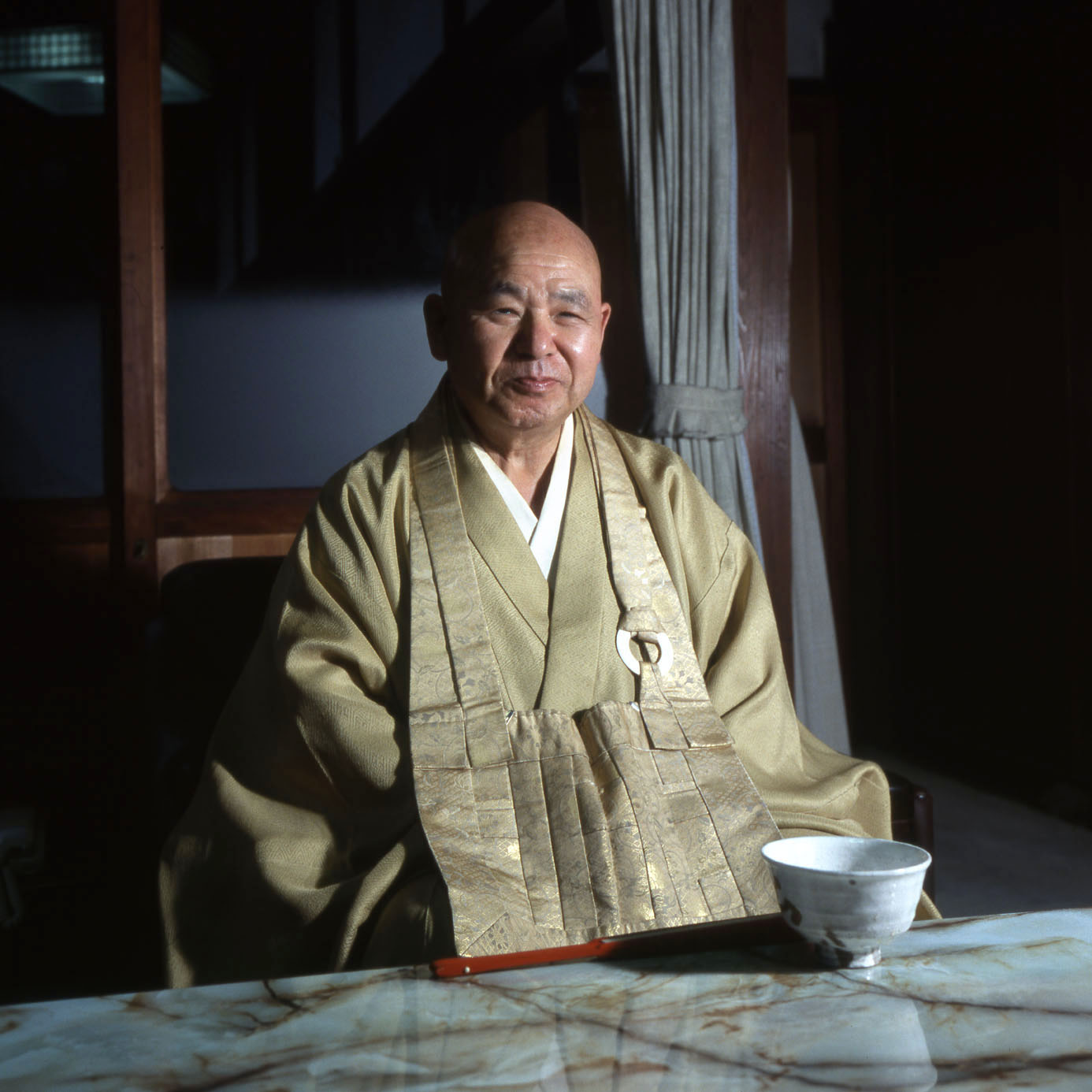

Personal life
- Born: March 1, 1933 Kobe, Hyogo, Japan
- Died: March 1, 2011 (age 78)
- Education: Otani University
- Occupation: Writer; Rōshi

Religious life
- Religion: Zen Buddhism
- School: Rinzai

Senior posting
- Based in: Tofuku-ji

Keidō Fukushima (福島 慶道, Rōmaji: Fukushima Keidō, March 1, 1933 – March 1, 2011) was a Japanese Rinzai Zen master, head abbot of Tōfuku-ji (one of the main branches of the Rinzai sect), centered in Kyoto, Japan. Because of openness to teaching Western students, he had considerable influence on the development of Rinzai Zen practice in the West.

== Biography ==
=== Zen studies ===
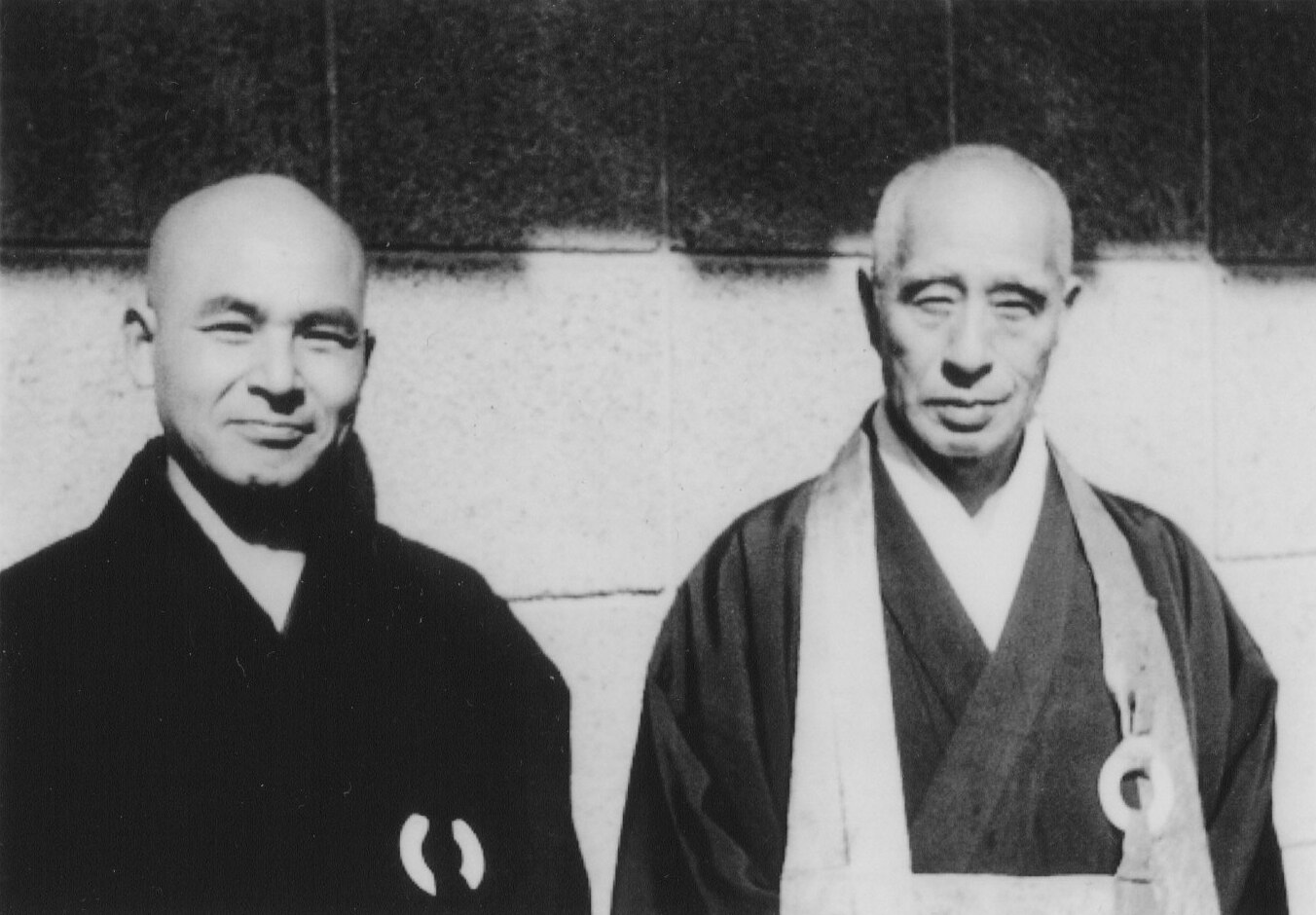
Keidō Fukushima with his teacher Zenkei Shibayama in the US, 1969.

Fukushima became an acolyte monk at the age of thirteen under his original teacher Kidō Okada, abbot of Hōfuku-ji monastery in Okayama, Japan. Fukushima graduated from Otani University's Department of Buddhist Studies in 1956, following completion of Otani's doctoral course. In 1961 he began monastic training with Zenkei Shibayama at Nanzen-ji Monastery in Kyoto. Fukushima's main teacher, Zenkei Shibayama, was instrumental in helping to transplant Rinzai Zen to the West. He was one of the first Rinzai Zen masters to hold retreats in the United States, and to publish books in English: A Flower Does Not Talk, Ox-herding Pictures, and Zen Comments on the Mumonkan / Gateless Barrier. Shibayama made annual visits to the United States in the late 1960s. In 1969 he was accompanied by Fukushima (at that time senior monk at Nanzen-ji and known as Genshō). In 1973 Fukushima received a fellowship to study English at the Claremont Colleges where he conducted seminars on Zen and led zazen practice.

=== Zen master ===
Acknowledged as a Zen master in 1974, Fukushima was appointed vice-resident abbot of Hōfuku-ji where he began to train his own disciples. In 1980, he was appointed master of the Tōfuku-ji training monastery (senmon dōjō 専門道場) in Kyoto. He was elected head abbot (kanchō 管長) of Tōfuku-ji in 1991, supervising 363 affiliated temples.

After being named Zen master and given the name Keidō, Fukushima strove to carry out his teacher Shibayama's intention to introduce Rinzai Zen to the West. He accepted Western students as monks, both at Hōfuku-ji and Tōfuku-ji. Counter to tradition, he let women participate in monastic sesshin-retreats. He conducted annual speaking tours at American universities including Pomona College, Millsaps College, Hendrix College, Bard College, Columbia University, Bucknell University, Xavier University in Cincinnati, Berea College, Harvard University, the University of Pennsylvania, the University of Kansas, the University of Richmond, Middlebury College and the University of Vermont. From 1991 onwards, these tours included some sesshin-retreats. After decades of contact with American Zen, Fukushima gradually revised his views on it. In October 2007 he wrote:

While American Zen has certainly learned a great deal from Japanese Zen, I think it is now time for American Zen to stand on its own two feet. In contrast with the 'monastic Zen' of Japan, American Zen is essentially a 'lay Zen.'

Fukushima also worked to raise awareness and funds to revive and reconstruct several of China's important historical monasteries, thereby aiding Chán's emergence from the Cultural Revolution's devastating effects. Jōshū's monastery at Zhao Zhou, now known as Bailin, was the first of these efforts to achieve official government support. On later trips, Fukushima and other priests provided assistance for the rebuilding of Manjuji (萬寿寺) on Mt. Kinzan (径山), of particular importance to the Tōfuku-ji tradition since the founder Enni Ben’en (also known as Shōichi Kokushi) trained there between 1235 and 1241.

=== Calligraphy ===
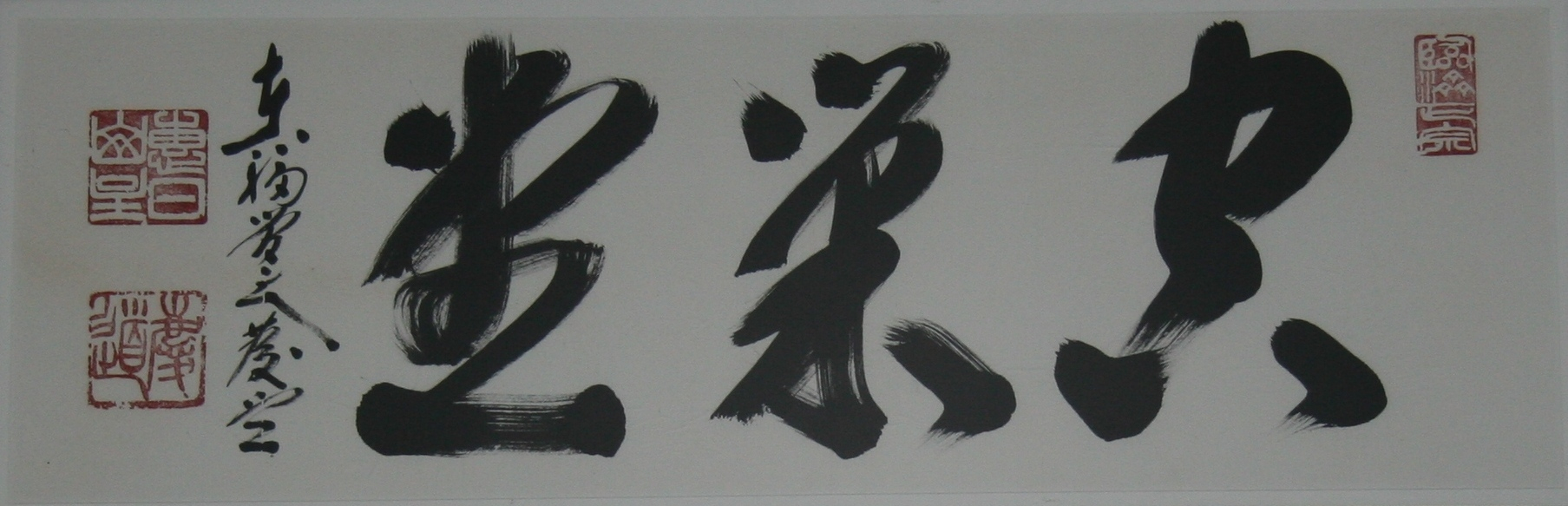
Calligraphy by Fukushima.

Well known for his calligraphy, Fukushima was an authority on reading classical Chinese and Kanbun (a hybrid Chinese/Japanese script). Although many Buddhist priests produce religiously inspired art, they rarely create their works in front of an audience. Fukushima realized the very act of doing calligraphy could exert educational and inspirational influence upon those who witnessed it. In keeping with Japanese conventions, he did not give calligraphy demonstrations for Japanese audiences, but he did incorporate such events among his overseas teaching activities.

=== Death ===
Around 2000, Fukushima began showing symptoms of the onset of Parkinson's disease, and his health steadily declined. He died on his seventy-eighth birthday (March 1) in 2011.

== Teachings, students and Dharma heirs ==
Throughout his teaching career, Fukushima was clear about what is required to train others using kōan. Guiding others in this training can be done by those who have finished the entire kōan curriculum through rigorous training over many years, then matured further on their own. One can only guide someone else in kōan study when one has gone all the way through it oneself and resolved the One Great Matter.

Fukushima authorized one Japanese Dharma heir, Yūdō Harada (also known as Ji'en; current training master at Tōfuku-ji Monastery),' and one lay successor, Jeff Shore (Fukushima's lay disciple since 1982).

Although Fukushima was strict about preserving the traditional practices of Rinzai Zen, he was open to accepting those of other faiths and traditions as his disciples. Among these were Phra Thana Kaokham (a Thai monk of the Thai Forest Tradition), Muho Noelke (2002 – 2020 abbot of the Sōtō Zen temple Antai-ji in Hyōgo, Japan), and Justin Lanier (American Anglican/Episcopal priest). Fukushima permitted Westerners to live in the monastery and train under him at both Hōfuku-ji and Tōfuku-ji. Senior disciples who have done sustained training under Fukushima include Alex Taikei Vesey, Hap Tivey, Tayo Gabler, James Green, Tim Armacost, Ron Sinnige, Alex Buijs, and Sally Stein.

== Bibliography ==
=== Japanese ===
- Fukushima, Keidō (2013), Jōshū-roku Teishō, Shunjūsha, ISBN 978-4-393-14281-3
- Fukushima, Keidō; Fumi Dan (2006). Tōfukuji. Tankōsha. ISBN 4-473-03353-8. OCLC 145752382.
- Fukushima, Keidō (2005). Ima koko o mushin ni ikiru. Shunjūsha. ISBN 4-393-14407-4. OCLC 170070495.
- Fukushima, Keidō (2001). Hokkugyō no kokoro. Shunjūsha. ISBN 4-393-14397-3. OCLC 166485306.
- Fukushima, Keidō (1998). Mushin no satori: kōyūken kōenroku. Shunjūsha. ISBN 4-393-14391-4. OCLC 170207323.
- Fukushima, Keidō (1994). Zen wa mu no shūkyō: Kōyūken hōwashū. Hakujusha. ISBN 4-8263-0071-9. OCLC 145752382.

=== Chinese ===
- Fukushima, Keidō; Li Gao (1996). Chan shi wu di zong jiao: Geng you xuan fa yu. Shijiazhuang Shi: Hebei jiao yu chu ban she. ISBN 7-5434-2710-9. OCLC 40786640.

=== English ===
- Seo, Audrey Yoshiko; Addiss, Stephen (with) (1998), The Art of Twentieth-Century Zen: Paintings and Calligraphy By Japanese Masters, Shambhala, ISBN 1570625530
- Harris, Ishwar (2004), The Laughing Buddha of Tofukuji: The Life of Zen Master Keido Fukushima, World Wisdom, ISBN 0-941532-62-3
- Green, James (tr.) (2001), Foreword to "The Recorded Sayings of Zen Master Joshu", Shambhala, ISBN 1-57062-414-3
- Fukushima; Green, James, tr. (2009), Foreword to "The Sayings of Layman P'ang: A Zen Classic of China", Shambhala, ISBN 978-1-59030-630-7
- Dujin, Veljko (2011), Zenmi—A Taste of Zen: Paintings, Calligraphy, and Ceramics from the Riva Lee Asbell Collection, Morikami Museum and Japanese Gardens, ISBN 978-1-882865-08-6
- Fukushima, Keido (2017), Schireson, Grace; Schireson, Peter (eds.), Zen Bridge: The Zen Teachings of Keido Fukushima, Wisdom Publications, ISBN 978-1-61429-197-8

== See also ==
- Buddhism in Japan
- List of Rinzai Buddhists
- Timeline of Zen Buddhism in the United States

== Sources ==
- Fukushima (2009), Foreword to "The Sayings of Layman P'ang: A Zen Classic of China", translated by Green, James, Shambhala, ISBN 978-1-59030-630-7
- Harris, Ishwar (2004), The Laughing Buddha of Tofukuji: The Life of Zen Master Keido Fukushima, World Wisdom, ISBN 0-941532-62-3
