= Kenryo Kanamatsu =

Japanese philosopher (1915–1986)

Kenryō Kanamatsu (金松賢諒; 1915 – 1986) was a Japanese translator, author, and lifelong devotee of Jōdo Shinshū, sometimes called "Shin Buddhism". His seminal work, Naturalness, (written in 1949), was an introduction of Jōdo Shinshū to the Western world.

== Biography ==
Born in 1915, in Kyoto, Kanamatsu received his B.A. in philosophy at Ōtani University. A Fulbright scholar at Cornell University and the University of Chicago, he received his doctorate and became a Professor at Ōtani University. A translator as well as an author, Kanamatsu translated the works of Plato into Japanese. In 1971, he published a book on the theology and cosmology of Plato.
