= Bamboo Forest (Kyoto) =

Natural area in Japan

Sagano Bamboo Forest
- Sagano Bamboo forest in Kyoto, Japan

- Location in Kyoto Prefecture, Japan

Geography
- Location: Arashiyama, Kyoto, Japan
- Coordinates: 35°01′00″N 135°40′18″E

Ecology
- Ecosystem: Bamboo forest
- Lesser flora: Moso bamboo (Phyllostachys edulis)

The Bamboo Forest, Arashiyama Bamboo Grove, or Sagano Bamboo Forest is a natural bamboo forest in Arashiyama, Kyoto, Japan. It is known for its mōsō bamboo (Phyllostachys edulis) and has several pathways for tourists and visitors. The Ministry of the Environment considers it a part of the soundscape of Japan.

The forest is not far from Tenryū-ji temple, which is the headquarters of the Rinzai school of Zen Buddhism, and the Nonomiya Shrine.

Prior to 2015, there was a charge to access the forest.

== Location ==
The Sagano Bamboo Forest is situated northwest of Kyoto, near the Tenryū-ji temple, which is the headquarters of the Rinzai school of Zen Buddhism, and the Nonomiya Shrine. It covers an area of 16 km^{2} (6.2 sq mi). The forest backs onto Arashiyama Park.

== Climate ==
The region experiences unpredictable weather, with a cool climate and bright sunlight. The summers are short, hot, and mostly cloudy. The winters are cold, windy, and partly cloudy. It is also wet year-round. Over the course of the year, the temperature typically ranges from 32 °F (0 °C) to 89 °F (32 °C). The summers last for approximately two months, from late June until mid-September, with an average daily high temperature above 80 °F (27 °C). The winters last for approximately three months, from early December to mid-March, with an average daily high temperature below 53 °F (12 °C).
