= Zenkei Shibayama =

Japanese Buddhist monk (1894–1974)

Personal life
- Born: 30 November 1894 Japan
- Died: 29 August 1974 (aged 79)
- Occupation: Writer; Rōshi

Religious life
- Religion: Zen Buddhism
- School: Rinzai

Senior posting
- Based in: Nanzen-ji; Otani University

Zenkei Shibayama (柴山 全慶, Shibayama Zenkei; 1894 – 1974), a former Abbot of Nanzen-ji, was a Japanese Rinzai master well known for his commentary on the Mumonkan. One of his better-known students was Keido Fukushima, abbot of Tōfuku-ji. Shibayama also taught at Otani University and was the head abbot of the entire Nanzenji Organization, overseeing the administration of over five hundred temples. Due to a number of lecture tours he undertook to the United States in the 1960s, and the translation of several of his books into English, Shibayama was a significant contributor to the establishment of Zen in America.

== See also ==
- Buddhism in Japan
- List of Rinzai Buddhists

== Bibliography ==
- Zen Comments on the Mumonkan. Harper & Row. 1974. ISBN 0-06-067279-X. OCLC 804989.
- On Zazen Wasan: Hakuin's Song of Zazen. Kyoto. 1967. OCLC 2279785.
- Shibayama, Zenkai; Gyokusei Jikihara (1967). Zen Oxherding Pictures. Tokyo: Sōgensha. OCLC 174614524.
- A Flower Does Not Talk. Kyoto: Shibayama. 1966. OCLC 3836026.
