= Ōtani University =

University in Kyoto, Japan

Coordinates: 35°02′35″N 135°45′29″E

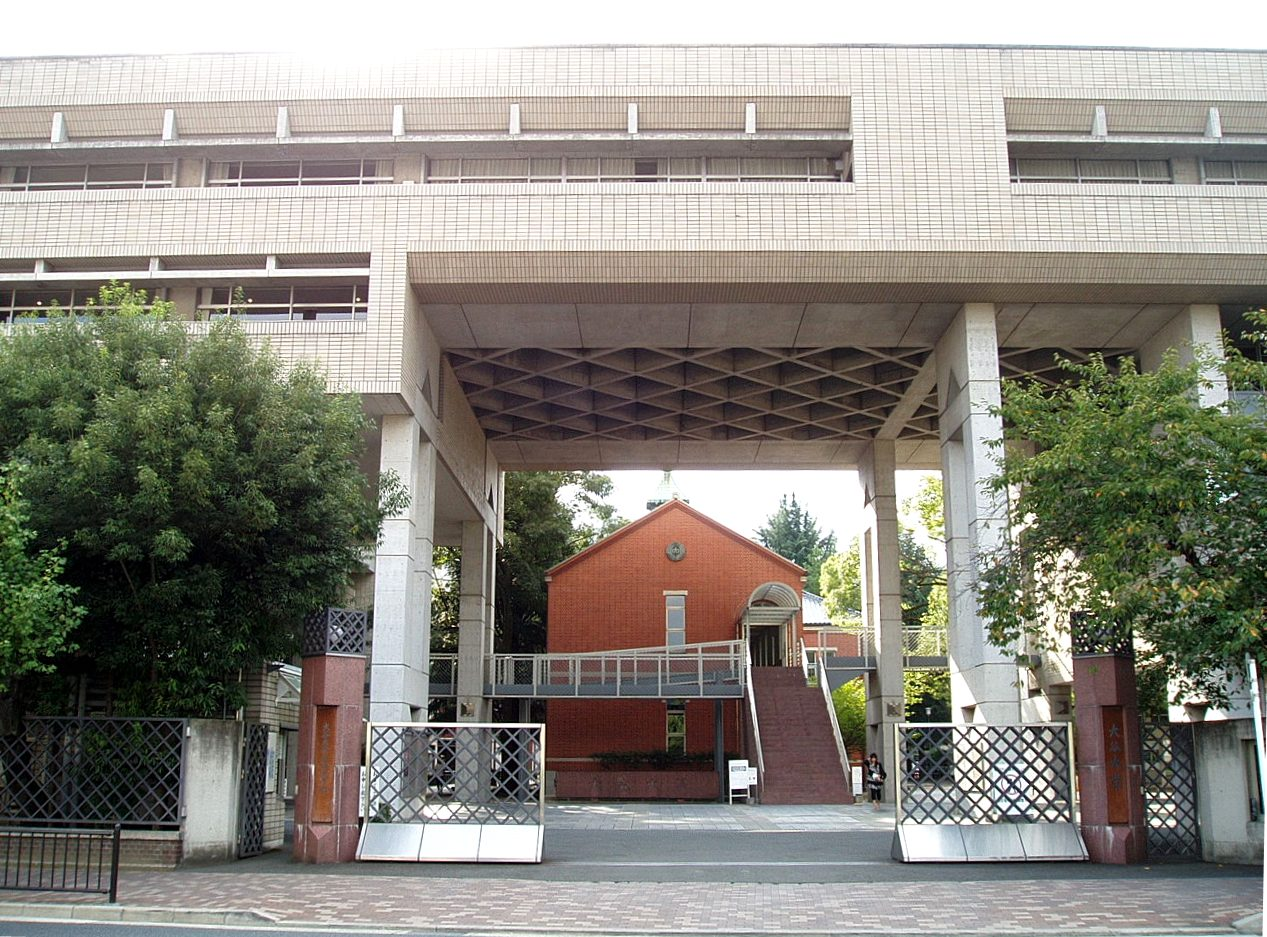
- Main Gate of Ōtani University
- Former names: Shinshū University
- Established: 1901
- Affiliations: Buddhist
- Location: Kyoto, Japan
- Website: http://www.otani.ac.jp/

Ōtani University (大谷大学, Ōtani Daigaku) is a private Buddhist university in Kita-ku, Kyoto, Japan. Ōtani University is a coeducation institution with an emphasis on Buddhist studies. A two-year private junior college is associated with the university. The university is associated with the Ōtani School of Jōdo Shinshū, or Shin, school of Buddhism.

== History ==
Ōtani University traces its origin to the early Edo period (1603 – 1868). It was founded in 1655, and served as the seminary of Higashi Hongan-ji. The shōgun Tokugawa Ieyasu founded Higashi Hongan-ji in 1602 by splitting it from Nishi Hongan-ji to diminish the power of Buddhism's Shin sect. The seminary was strengthened and revived in 1755, and developed a broader curriculum throughout the 19th century.

The modern university was founded in 1901 as Shinshū University in Tokyo's Sugamo neighborhood. Shinshū University was closely associated with Kiyozawa Manshi (1863–1903), a Shin Buddhist reformer from a low-ranking samurai background who studied at the University of Tokyo under the American philosopher Ernest Fenollosa (1853–1908). Kiyozawa also served as the first dean of the university. In 1904 the university achieved the legal status of senmon gakkō, or vocational school.

Shinshū University moved from Tokyo to Kyoto in 1911. It had a curriculum of three years of general study, two years of specialized study, and four years of graduate-level study. The university moved to new buildings in the Koyamahigashifusa-chō neighborhood of Kita-ku in 1913, remains at this location. Shinshū attained university status in 1922, and was renamed Ōtani University the same year. Under the Education Law of 1947 Ōtani University transitioned to the post-World War II educational system, and was reclassified as a university. Ōtani University Museum opened in 2003.

== Notable alumni and faculty ==
- Kaneko Daiei (1881–1976)
- Keido Fukushima
- Kenryo Kanamatsu
- Soga Ryōjin (1875–1971)
- Zenkei Shibayama
- Daisetz Teitaro Suzuki (1870–1966)
- Volker Zotz

== See also ==
- Otani University Junior College
