= Itsukushima Shrine (Kyoto) =

Shinto shrine in Japan

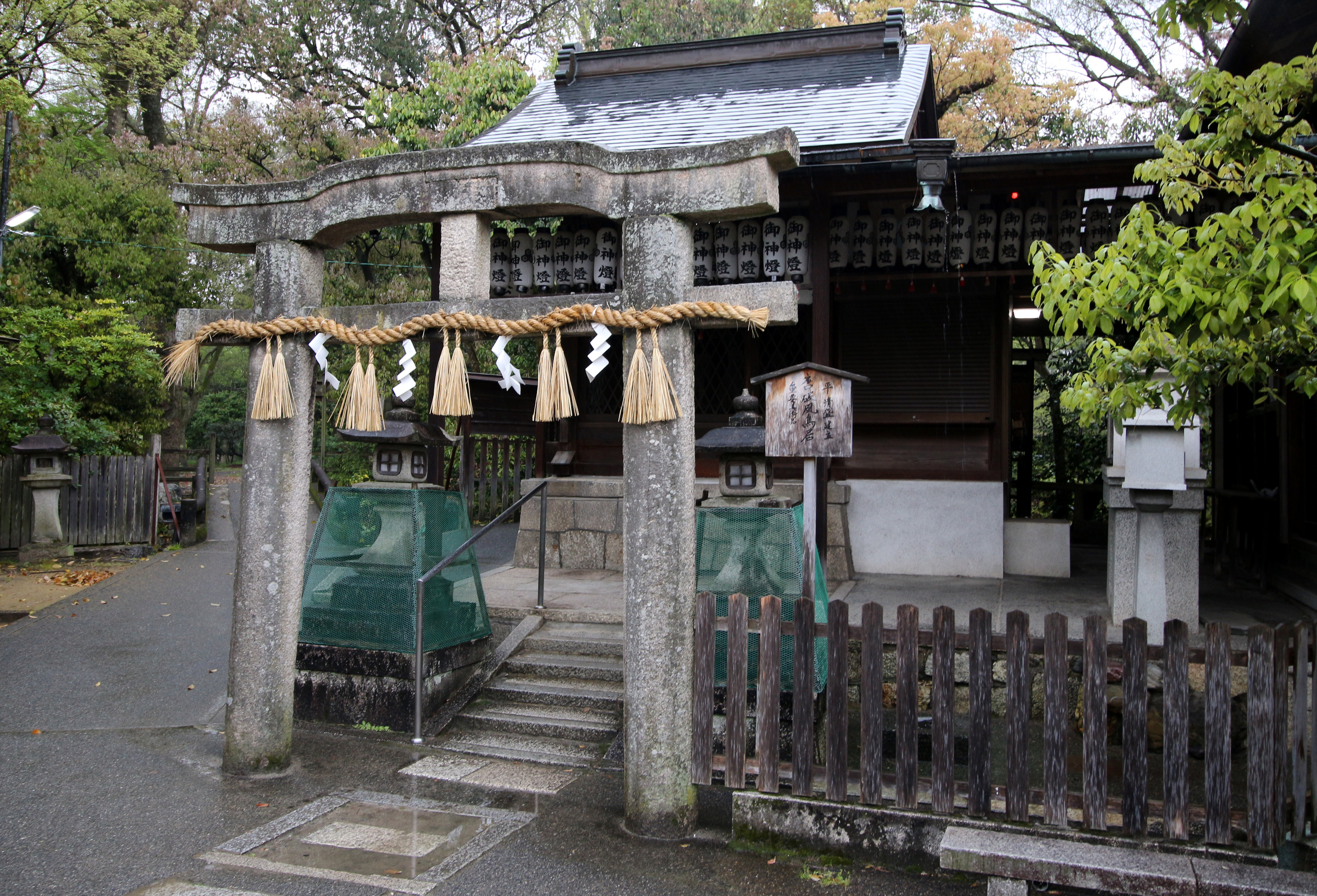
- 35°01′05″N 135°45′43″E
- Location: Kyoto, Japan
- Type: Shrine

Itsukushima Shrine (Japanese: Itsukushima-jinja) is a Shinto shrine in Kyoto Gyoen National Garden, Kyoto, Japan.
