= Kyoto Gyoen National Garden =

Garden in Kyoto, Japan

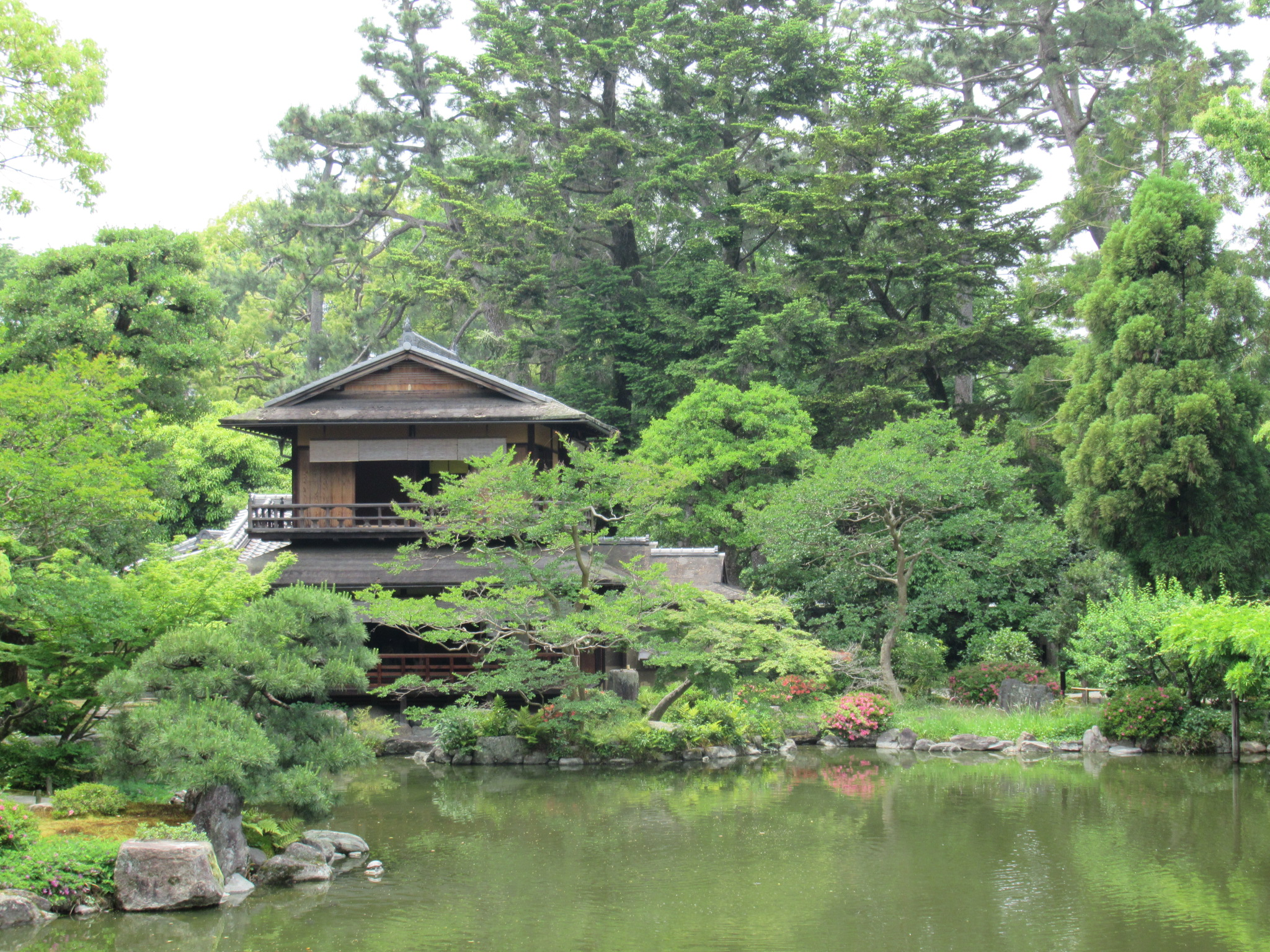
- Shusui-tei, 2019
- Interactive map of Kyoto Gyoen National Garden
- Location: Kyoto, Japan
- Coordinates: 35°01′24″N 135°45′50″E

Kyoto Gyoen National Garden (京都御苑, Kyōto-gyoen) is a 65-hectare national garden of Japan that was established after the Japanese capital was transferred from Kyoto to Tokyo. It is situated around the Kyoto Imperial Palace.

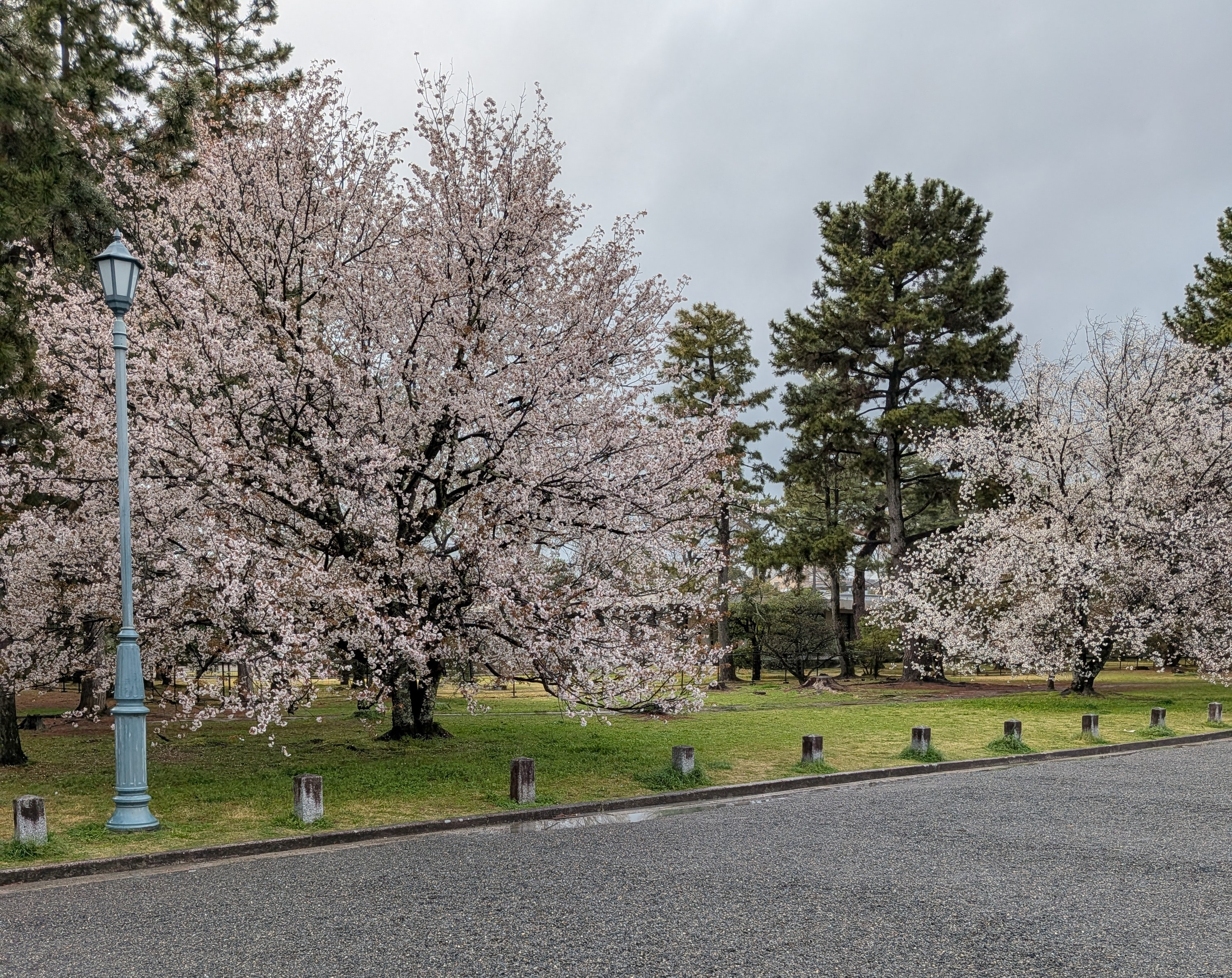
Cherry blossoms in Kyoto Gyoen

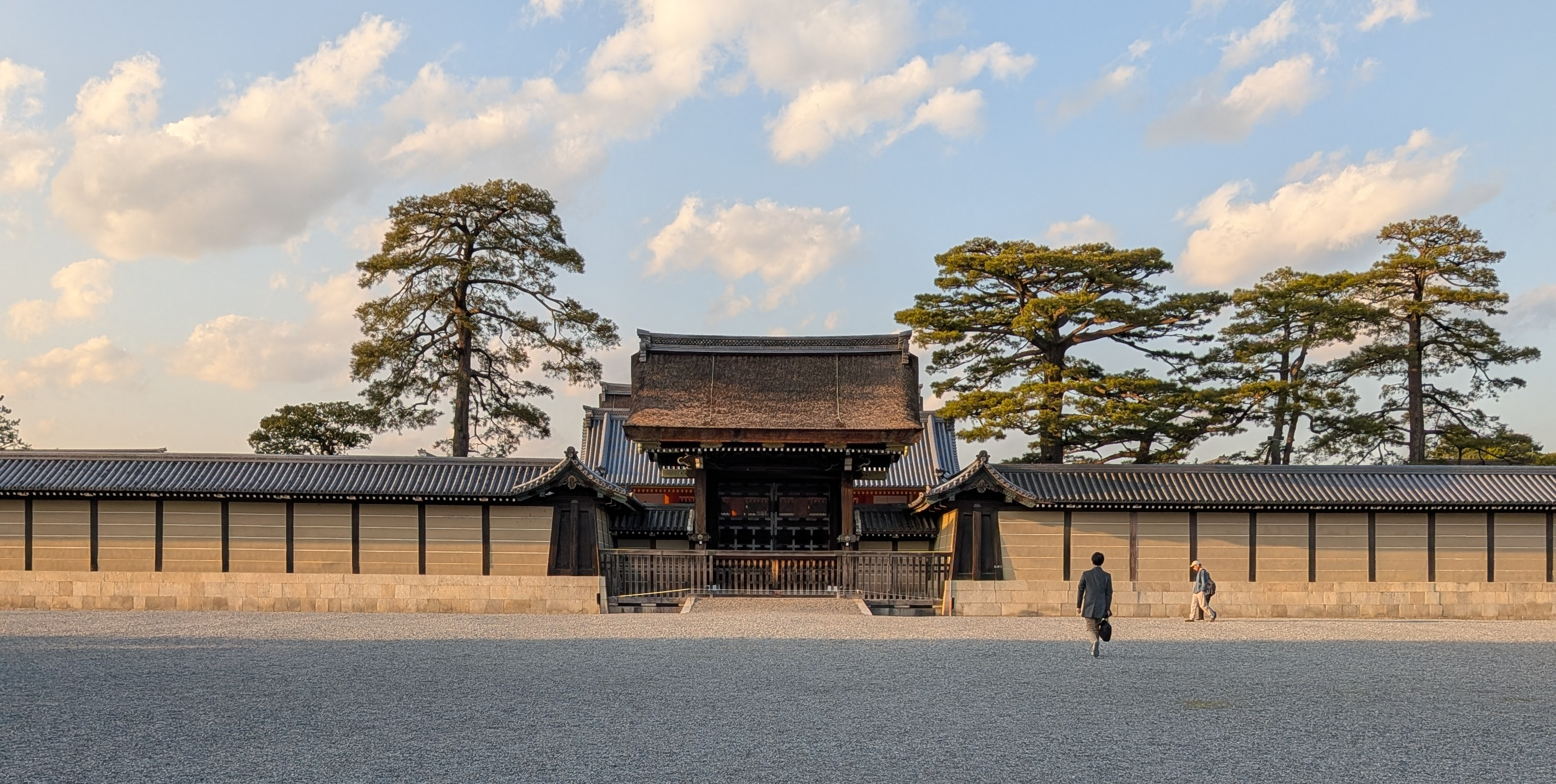
Kyoto Imperial Palace

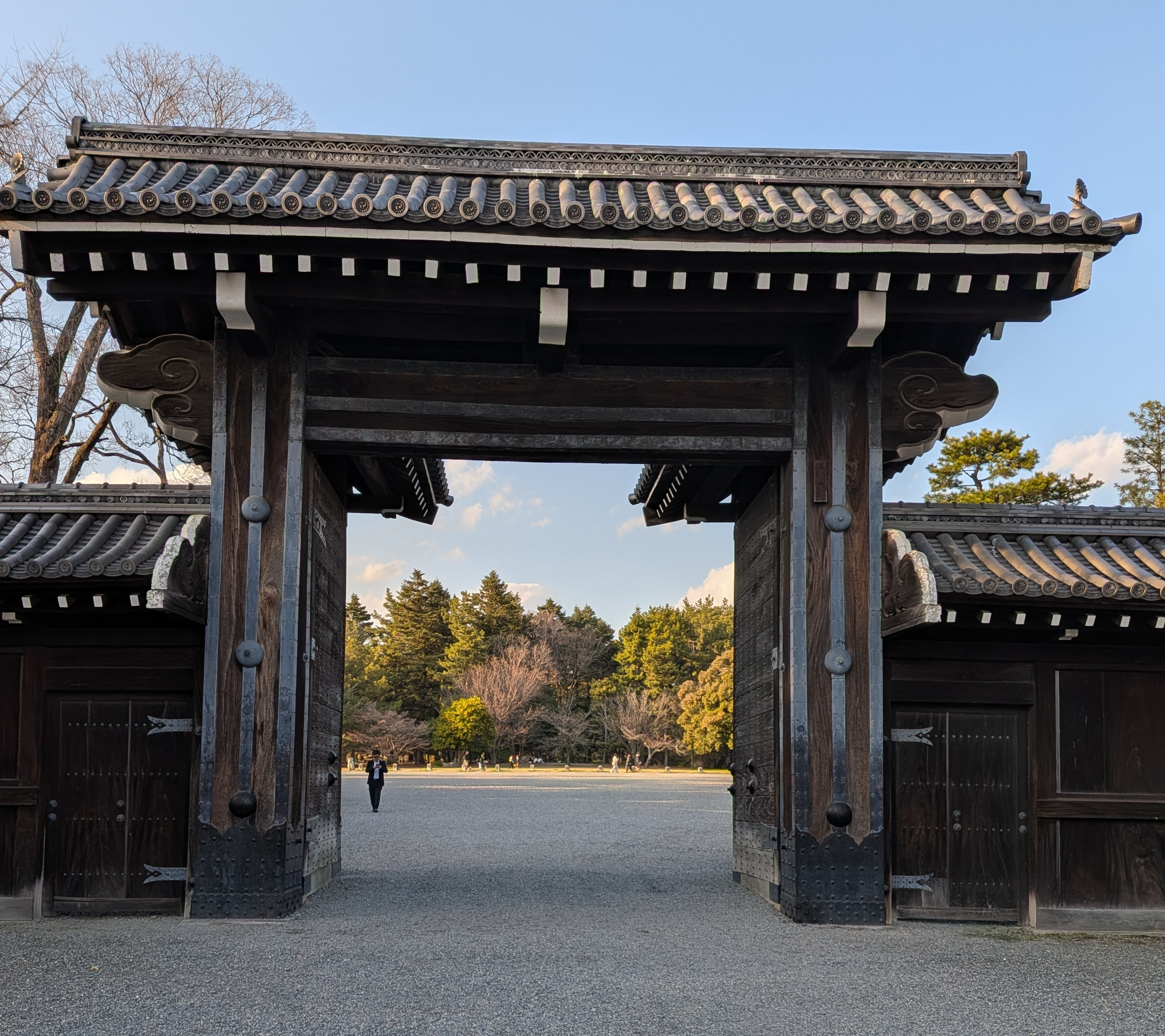
Sakaimachi Gate

== See also ==
- Itsukushima Shrine (Kyoto)
- Shirakumo Shrine
