= Museum of Furuta Oribe =

Museum in Kita-ku, Kyoto, Japan

Coordinates: 35.0577°N 135.7328°E

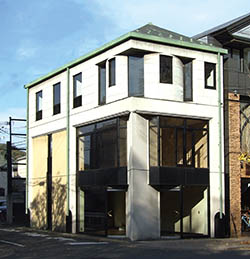
Museum of Furuta Oribe

Museum of Furuta Oribe (古田織部美術館) is a museum in Kita-ku, Kyoto, dedicated to works of Lord Furuta Oribe.
