= Imamiya Shrine =

Shinto shrine in Kyoto Prefecture, Japan

Imamiya Shrine 今宮神社
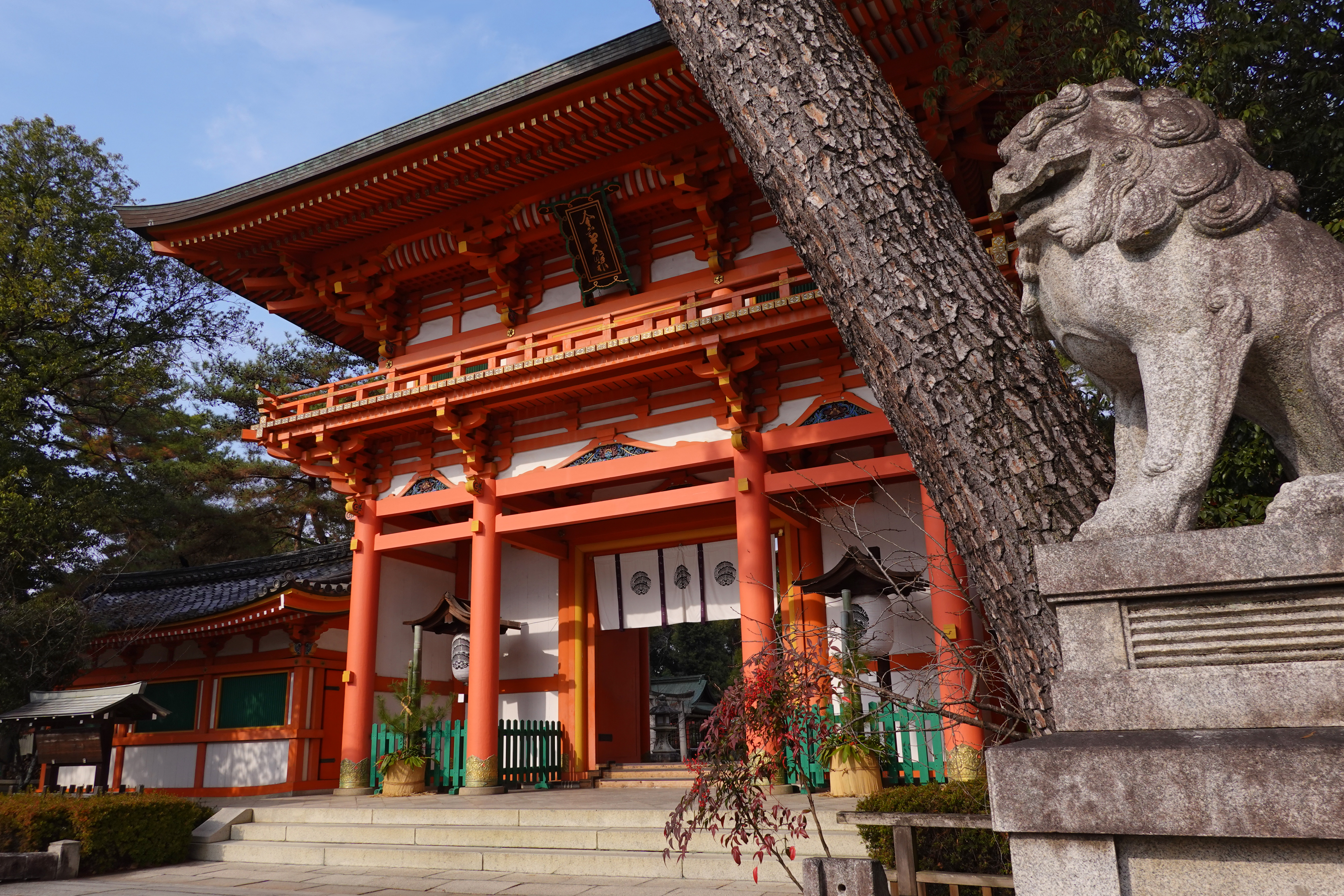
- Imamiya Shrine's main gate

- Location within Japan

Religion
- Affiliation: Shinto
- Deity: Ōkuninushi

Location
- Location: 21, Imamiya-cho, Murasakino; Kita-ku, Kyoto, Kyoto 603-8231
- Interactive map of Imamiya Shrine 今宮神社
- Coordinates: 35°2′44.80″N 135°44′31.39″E

Architecture
- Established: 994

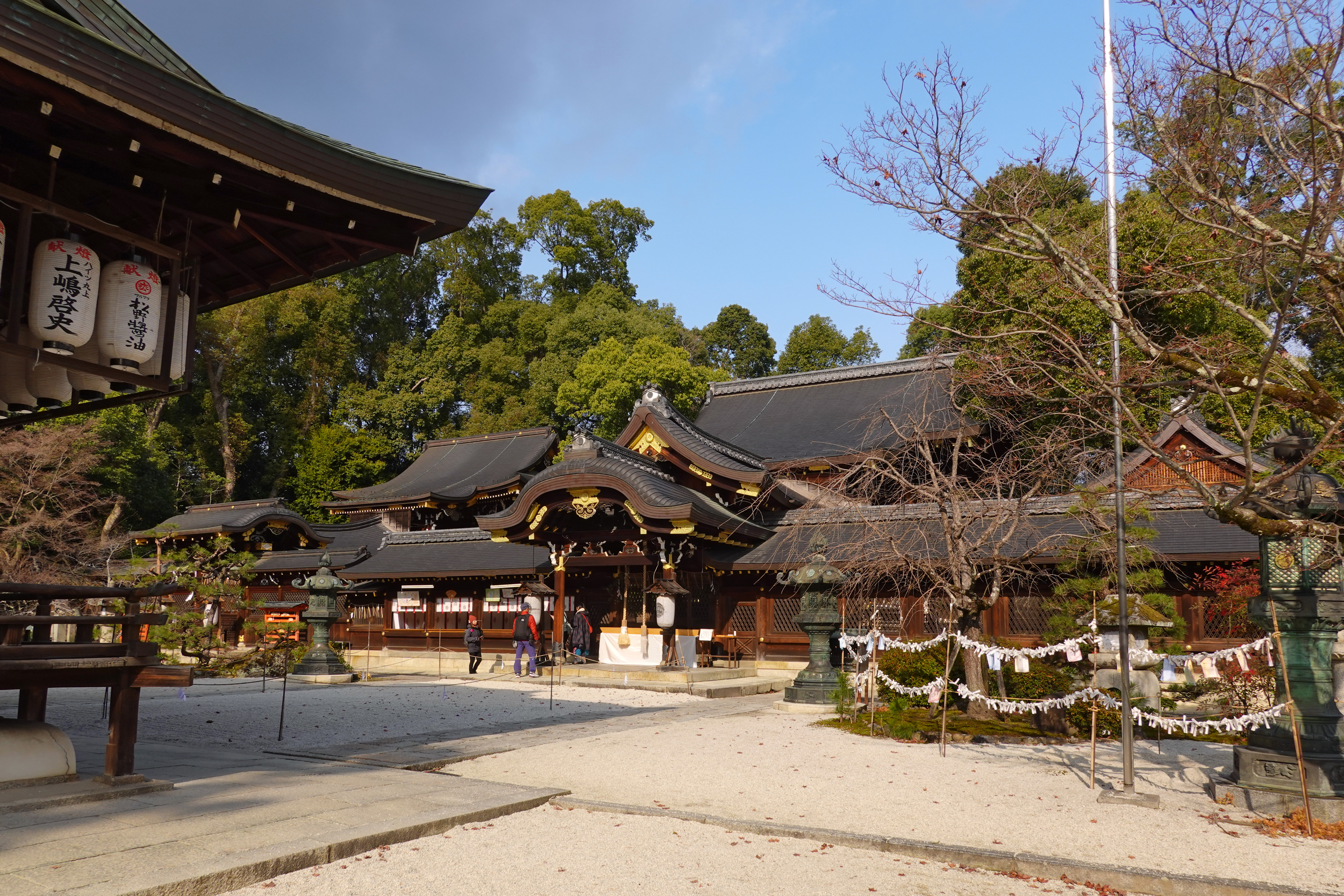
Haisho, Honden

Imamiya Shrine (今宮神社, Imamiya-jinja) is a Shinto shrine located in Kita-ku, Kyoto, Japan. It was originally established for patrons to pray for safety from an epidemic, though it has evolved into a shrine where patrons can pray for general good health. The shrine complex is embedded in a forest of large trees northwest of Daitoku-ji and includes many minor shrines in addition to the main shrine, or honden. On every second Sunday in April, one of the 3 major festivals in Kyoto, Yasurai Matsuri, is held at the shrine. The word imamiya (今宮) means "newly constructed."

== History ==
Imamiya Shrine was founded during the Heian period in 994. In 1001, however, the shrine was moved to its present-day location as a response to an epidemic that had hit the Kyoto area a year earlier. Current iterations of many of the structures were rebuilt in 1902. The shrine's festival, Yasurai Matsuri, was also created as a response to the epidemic. Through music and dance, the festival attempts to appease petrels around Kyoto with cherry blossom petals in their beaks, which were then believed to be spreading disease.

== Attractions ==
There are several attractions that are unique to Imamiya Shrine. Specifically, there are two longstanding restaurants adjacent to the shrine. These shops' specialty are aburimochi - skewered, roasted rice cakes that are a traditional Kyoto confection. The two restaurants, named Ichiwa and Kazariya, have been open since 1000 and 1656 respectively and are located immediately outside the shrine's east gate.

The shrine also houses a rock called ahokashisan. The stone is believed to possess magical properties. If a person rubs the stone and then rubs an injured area of their body, it is said that they will heal quicker than normal. Furthermore, if a person taps the stone three times, then lifts it, the stone will feel heavy. Afterwards, if the same person strokes the stone three times while making a wish and then lifts it for a second time and the stone feels light, it is said that their wish will be granted. The ahokashisan, as well as Yasurai Matsuri, are designated Important Cultural Properties.

== See also ==
- List of Shinto shrines
- List of Shinto shrines in Kyoto
