= List of Shinto shrines in Kyoto Prefecture =

List of Shinto shrines in Kyoto includes many Shinto shrines; but this list encompasses only some of the 400 Shinto shrines with scattered locations throughout the municipality of Kyoto and the prefecture of Kyoto:

The Kamo Shrine predates the founding of Heian-kyō.

- Kamigamo Shrine (上賀茂神社, Kamikamo-jinja), formally called Kamo Wakeikaduchi Shrine (賀茂別雷神社).
- Shimogamo Shrine (下鴨神社, Shimokamo-jinja), formally called Kamo Mioya Shrine (賀茂御祖神社).

== Shrines of Heian Kyoto (794–1229) ==
- Fushimi Inari-taisha (伏見稲荷大社, Inari-jinja).
- Hirano Shrine (平野神社, Hirano-jinja).
- Imamiya Shrine (今宮神社, Imamiya-jinja).
- Iwashimizu Shrine (岩清水八幡宮; Iwashimizu Otokoyama Hachimangū).
- Kitano Tenmangū (北野天満宮; also known as Kitano-jinja).
- Matsunoo Shrine (松尾大社, Matsunoo-jinja).
- Nonomiya Shrine (野宮神社, Nonomiya-jingū).
- Yasaka Shrine (八坂神社, Yasaka-jinja), formerly known as Gion Shrine (祇園社, Gionsha).
- Yoshida Shrine (吉田神社, Yoshida-jinja).

== Shrines of Momoyama Kyoto (1582–1615) ==
- Toyokuni Shrine (豊国神社, Toyokuni-jinja), also known as Hokoku-jinja

== Shrines of Kyoto at peace (1615–1869) ==
- Goō Shrine (護王神社, Goō-jinja). — link to photo of shrine — boars at this shrine
- Heian Shrine (平安神宮, Heian jingū).
- Kenkun Shrine (建勲神社, Kenkun-jinja).
- Nashinoki Shrine (梨木神社, Nashinoki-jinja).
- Shiramine Jingū (白峯神宮)

== Modern period (1869– present) ==
- Nogi Shrine (乃木神社, Tōgō-jinja).
- Orimatsuinari Shrine（折松稲荷神社）.

== See also ==
- List of Buddhist temples in Kyoto
