= Kyoto Museum for World Peace =

Museum in Kyoto, Japan

Coordinates: 35°2′1.3″N 135°43′38.3″E

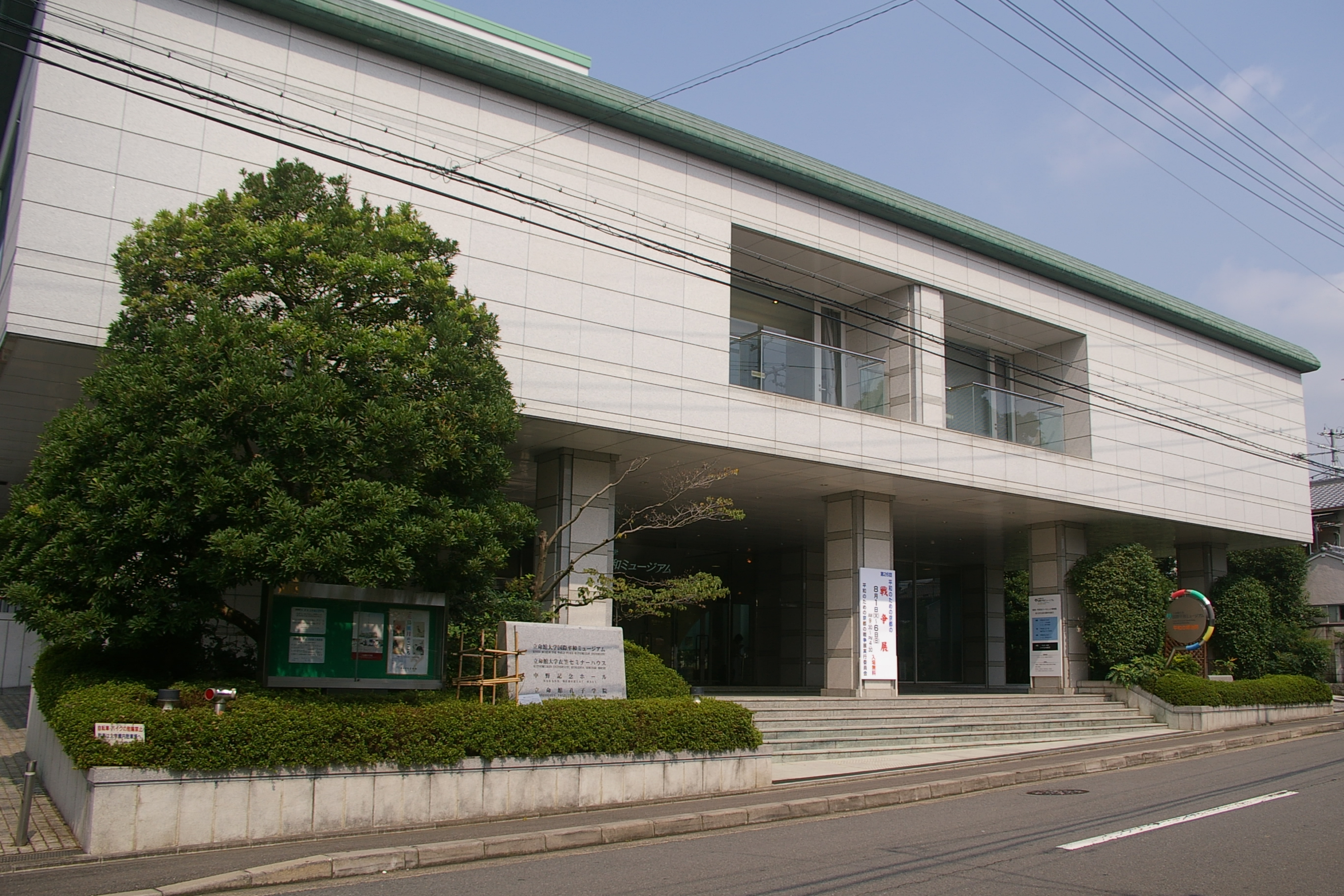
Kyoto Museum for World Peace, Ritsumeikan University in Kita-ku, Kyoto

The Kyoto Museum for World Peace (立命館大学国際平和ミュージアム, Ritsumeikan Daigaku Kokusai Heiwa Myūjiamu) is part of Ritsumeikan University in Kita-ku, Kyoto, Japan. The Museum is accessible to the public for a 200–400 Yen fee. The displays and materials are mostly in Japanese but there is a 25-page English booklet describing the exhibits. The museum is near Kinkaku-ji and just east of the main Ritsumeikan University campus. In 2004 the museum took over the exhibits of the museum that was part of the Young People's Plaza, designed by famous architect Kenzo Tange.

== Excerpt from English Pamphlet ==
The standing exhibits of Ritsumeikan University's Kyoto Museum for World Peace are currently designed to emphasize the importance of peace primarily by covering the problems of war and the arms race and accurately portraying the suffering they bring about. However, through its special exhibits, the Museum is also striving to extend its view to the problem of structural violence in an effort to contribute to the development of true peace.

The Museum for Peace also contributes to peace (Mission).

The Gallery for Peace exhibits living artists. It exhibits in the community. Since May 2000, it exhibited in two cafes, Duke and North Carolina State University, Carrboro Town Hall and two ballet schools.

The Gallery has contributed 3 paintings to the Florida Nature Conservation Center, 3 paintings to Soka University of America, and a 1 of 1 signed reproduction, and a 1 of 5 signed reproduction to the Alliance of AIDS Services-Carolina for their annual fund raising auction and sale of Art works, Works of the Heart, in October 2000, 2001, 2002, and 2003.

The Gallery for Peace, part of the Museum for Peace, exhibits contemporary art. The Gallery also teaches art and performance art.

The Gallery supports: exhibits promoting Peace, human rights through nonviolence, the Victory over Violence campaign, a healthy global environment, the abolition of war, global citizenship, other organizations dedicated to Peace, health care and education for all people.
