= Ōtani University Museum =

Mosque in Kyoto, Japan

- 大谷大学博物館
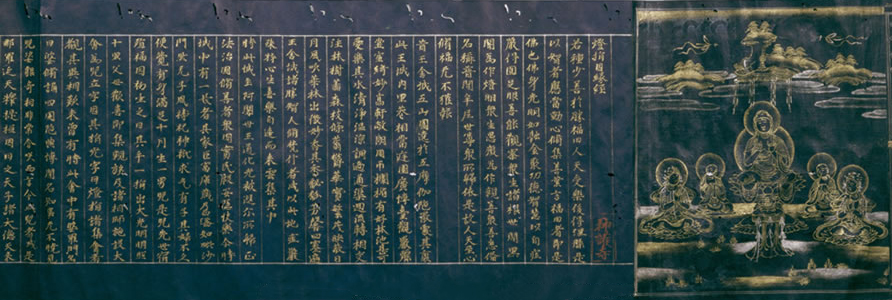
- Tōshiinnen-kyō (灯指因縁経)
- Interactive map of the Ōtani University Museum area

General information
- Location: Koyamakamifusa-chō, Kita-ku, Kyoto, Kyoto Prefecture, Japan
- Coordinates: 35°02′31″N 135°45′32″E
- Opened: October 2003

Website
- Official website

Ōtani University Museum (大谷大学博物館, Ōtani daigaku hakubutsukan) opened in Kyoto, Japan, in 2003. The Ōtani University collection, which relates in particular to Shin Buddhist culture, includes ten Important Cultural Properties. Among these are the February 1041 (Chōkyū 2) portion of Shunki (春記), the diary of Fujiwara no Sukefusa (藤原資房); the oldest surviving edition of Kukai's Kōya zappitsu-shū; and Jichin Kashō-den, a biography of Jien.

== See also ==
- Kyoto National Museum
- Daitoku-ji
