= Ryūkoku Museum =

Museum of Buddhist art and history in Kyoto, Japan

- 龍谷ミュージアム
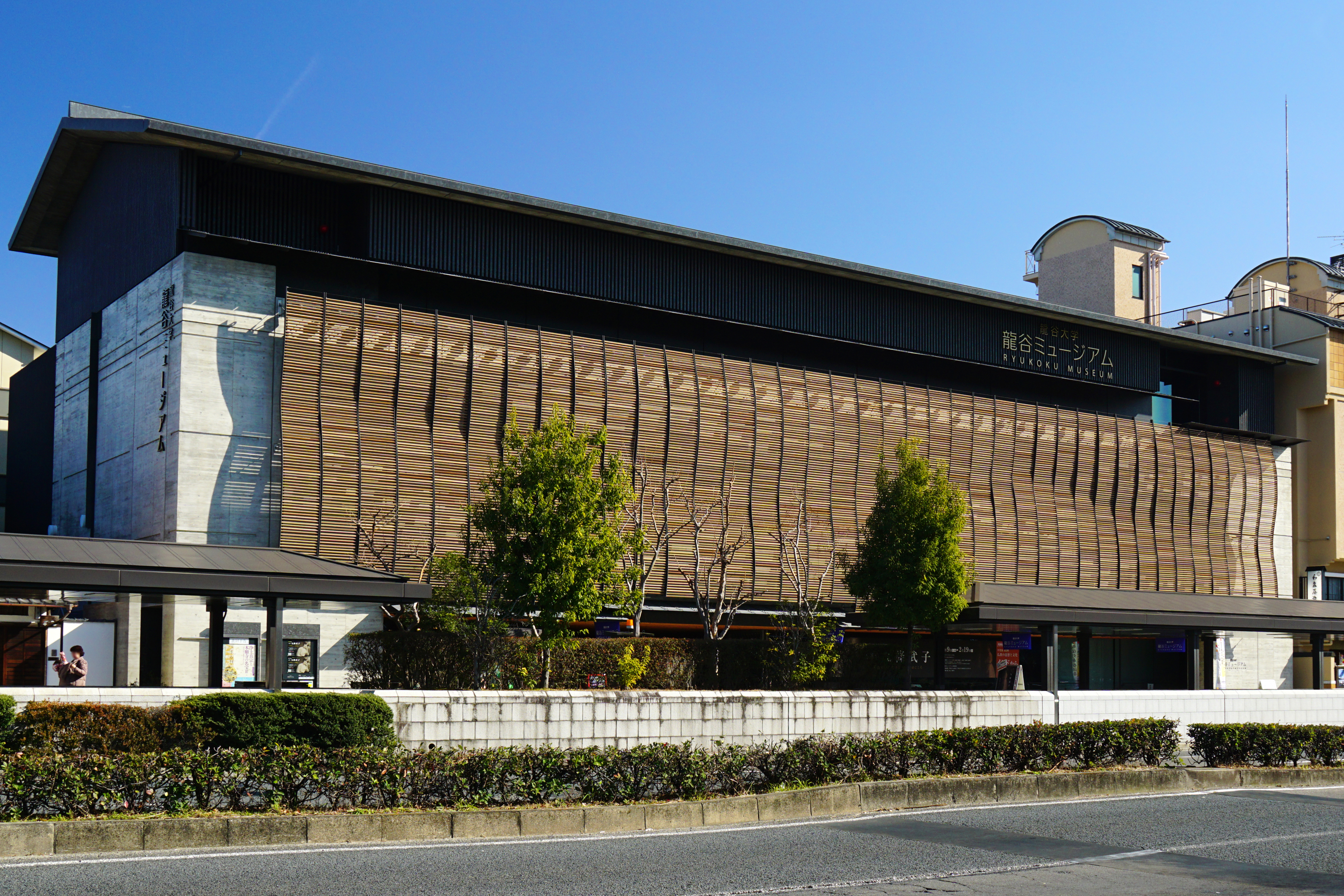
- Interactive map of the Ryūkoku Museum area

General information
- Location: 117 Nishinakasuji-dōri Shōmen Sagaru, Shimogyō-ku, Kyoto, Kyoto Prefecture, Japan
- Coordinates: 34°59′28″N 135°45′12″E
- Opened: April 2011

Technical details
- Floor count: 4
- Floor area: 1,000 square metres (11,000 sq ft) (exhibition space); 4,441.93 square metres (47,812.5 sq ft) (total)

Design and construction
- Architecture firm: Nikken Sekkei

Website
- Official website

The Ryūkoku Museum (龍谷ミュージアム) is a museum of Buddhist art and history in Kyōto, Japan. Conceived as part of the 370th anniversary celebrations of the foundation of what is now Ryūkoku University, it opened facing Nishi Hongan-ji in 2011. The museum displays works from its "vast" collection and there is also a digital recreation of the corridor of Cave 15 at Bezeklik. The façade has four thousand ceramic louvers, intended to give a feeling of traditional Kyōto while also helping regulate light and temperature within.

== See also ==
- List of National Treasures of Japan (writings: Japanese books)
- Kyoto National Museum
- Nishi Hongan-ji
