= Kita-ku, Kyoto =

Kita 北区
- Ward of Kyoto
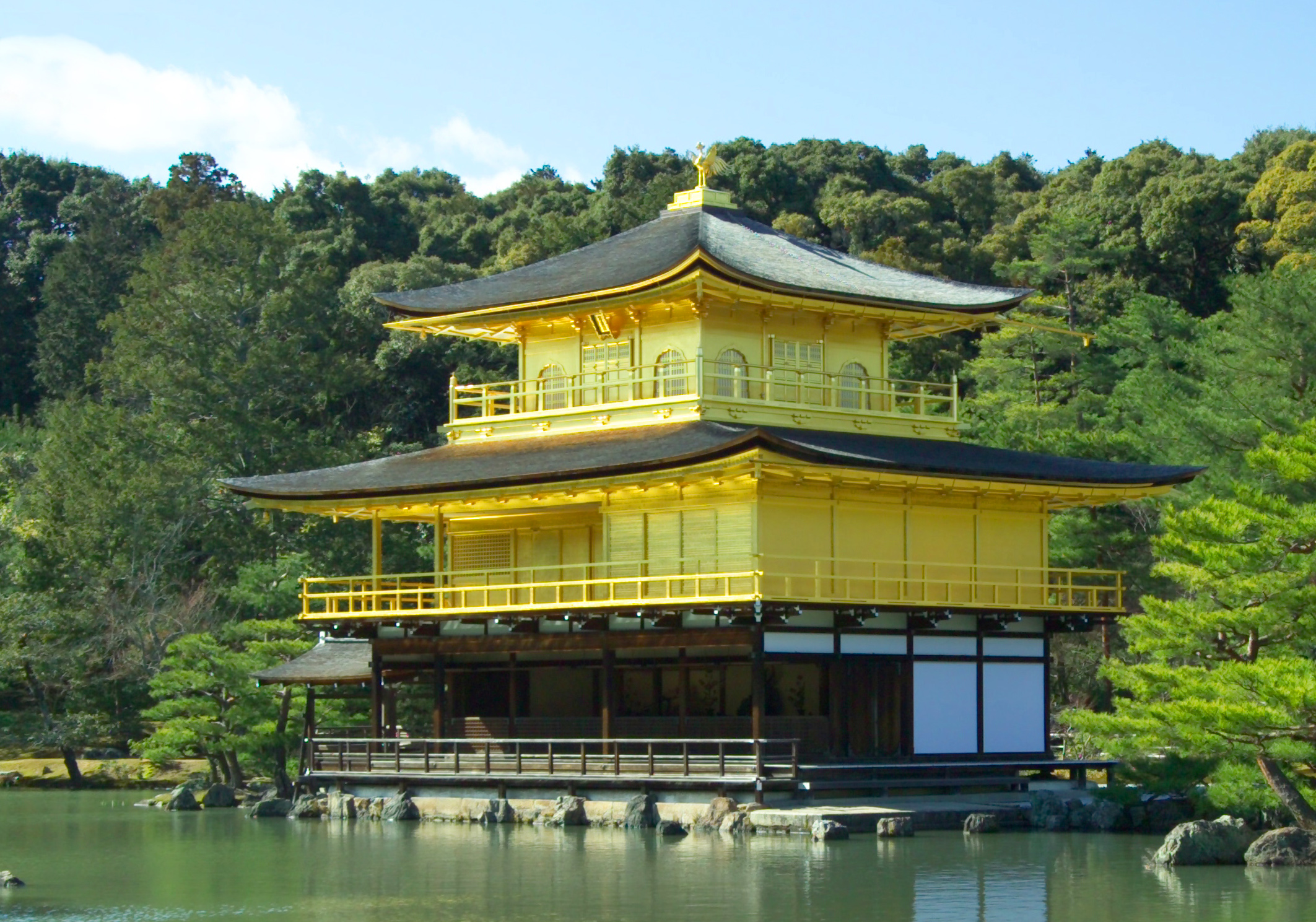
- Kinkaku, the Golden Pavilion of Rokuon-ji, is one of the most famous landmarks of Kita-ku.

- Location of Kita-ku in Kyoto

- Location of Kita-ku in Japan
- Coordinates: 35°2′28″N 135°45′15″E
- Country: Japan
- Prefecture: Kyoto
- City: Kyoto
- Founded: 1955

Area
  - Total: 94.88 km^{2} (36.63 sq mi)
- Highest elevation: 895 m (2,936 ft)
- Lowest elevation: 60 m (200 ft)

Population (October 1, 2020)
  - Total: 117,165
  - Density: 1,235/km^{2} (3,198/sq mi)
- Time zone: UTC+9 (Japan Standard Time)
- Website: www.city.kyoto.lg.jp/kita/

Kita (北区, Kita-ku) is one of the eleven wards in the city of Kyoto, in Kyoto Prefecture, Japan. Its name means "North Ward." As of 2020, the ward has an estimated population of 117,165 people.

The Hiragino typeface is named after an area in the ward.

== Demographics ==
Historical population
| Year | Pop. | ±% |
|---|---|---|
| 1960 | 123,230 | — |
| 1970 | 135,681 | +10.1% |
| 1980 | 136,181 | +0.4% |
| 1990 | 127,348 | −6.5% |
| 2000 | 126,125 | −1.0% |
| 2010 | 122,037 | −3.2% |
| 2020 | 117,165 | −4.0% |

== Education ==
=== Universities ===
- Bukkyo University
- Kyoto Sangyo University
- Ritsumeikan University, Kinugasa Campus
- Otani University

=== Primary and secondary schools ===
The community previously had a North Korean school, Kyoto Korean No. 3 Elementary School (京都朝鮮第三初級学校).

== Culture ==
- Kyoto Museum for World Peace
- Ōtani University Museum
- Museum of Furuta Oribe
- Koryo Museum of Art

== Temples and landmarks ==
- Daitoku-ji, a famous Rinzai sect temple.
- Kamigamo Shrine, one of the oldest shrines in Japan.
- Kinkaku-ji, the Golden Pavilion, one of Japan's most famous temples.
- Imamiya Shrine, an ancient Shinto shrine dedicated to healing.
- Shinnyō-ji, a sub temple of Shōkoku-ji, famous for spring Iris blossoms.
