= Fukuda =

Fukuda (written: 福田) is a Japanese surname. Notable people with the surname include:

- Akiko Fukuda (福田 晶子; born 1937), Japanese long jumper
- Arihiro Fukuda (福田 有広; 1964–2003), Japanese historian of political thought
- Asuka Fukuda (福田 明日香; born 1984), Japanese singer
- Courtney Fukuda, American businessperson
- Eriko Fukuda (福田 衣里子; born 1980), Japanese politician
- Fukuda Hideko (福田 英子; 1865–1927), Japanese feminist activist
- Fukuda Gyōkai (福田行誡, 1809 – 1888), Japanese Buddhist monk
- Jun Fukuda (福田 純; 1923–2000), Japanese film director
- Kanon Fukuda (福田 花音; born 1995), birth name of Maro Kannagi (巫 まろ), member of J-pop group S/mileage
- Kaoru Fukuda (speed skater) (福田 薫; born 1955), Japanese speed skater
- Katsuji Fukuda (福田 勝治; 1899–1991), photographer
- Keiji Fukuda (born c. 1955), American physician with expertise in influenza epidemiology
- Keiko Fukuda (福田 敬子; 1913–2013), Japanese-American judo 10th dan
- Koichi Fukuda, Japanese-American guitarist/keyboardist in Static-X
- Komei Fukuda (福田 公明; born 1951), Japanese mathematician
- Masahiro Fukuda (福田 正博; born 1966), Japanese footballer
- Masakazu Fukuda (福田 雅一; 1972–2000), Japanese professional wrestler
- Masanosuke Fukuda (福田 雅之助; 1897–1974), Japanese tennis player
- Mayuko Fukuda (福田 麻由子; born 1994), Japanese Actress
- Mitsuo Fukuda (福田 己津央; born 1960), Japanese animation director
- Robert Fukuda (1922–2013), American politician and lawyer
- Sadayoshi Fukuda (福田 定良; 1917–2002), Japanese critic and philosopher
- Shigeo Fukuda (福田 繁雄; 1932–2009), Japanese sculptor and graphic designer
- Shin-Ichi Fukuda (福田 進一; born 1955), Japanese classical guitarist
- Shō Fukuda (福田 翔生; born 2001), Japanese footballer
- Shogo Fukuda (福田 将吾; born 1984), Japanese basketball player and coach
- Shuhei Fukuda (福田 秀平; born 1989), Japanese baseball player
- Takeo Fukuda (福田 赳夫; 1905–1995), 67th Prime Minister of Japan
- Tatsuo Fukuda (福田 達夫; born 1967), Japanese politician
- Tokio Fukuda (福田 時雄; 1915–2001), Japanese hurdler
- Tokuzō Fukuda (福田 徳三; 1874–1930), Japanese economist
- Tomiaki Fukuda (福田 富昭; born 1941), Japanese sport wrestler and sports official
- Tomoya Fukuda (福田 友也; born 1992), Japanese footballer
- Toshiji Fukuda (福田 俊司; born 1948), Japanese photographer
- Tsuneari Fukuda (福田 恆存; 1912–1994), Japanese dramatist, translator and literary critic
- Yasuhiko Fukuda (福田 裕彦; born 1957), Japanese composer and keyboardist
- Yasuo Fukuda (福田 康夫; 1936–2026), 91st Prime Minister of Japan
- Yoshitaka Fukuda (福田 吉孝; born 1948), founder of Aiful consumer finance company

== See also ==
- Fukuda Denshi Arena, a football stadium in Chiba, Japan

- Steve W. Fukuda, a Japanese American photographer
