= Banzui'i =

Banzui'i (幡随意) (December 1, 1542 - February 2, 1615) was a Japanese Buddhist monk and scholar of the Jōdo-shū sect throughout the late Sengoku period and early Edo period. He is best known for his assistance of the Tokugawa Shogunate in the suppression of Christianity throughout Kyushu. He is said to have created the practice of Fumi-e.

== History ==
Banzui'i was born in Fujisawa, Kanagawa, Japan, on December 1, 1542, as the son of the powerful Kawashima Clan. At the age of nine he aspired to become a monk and was ordained at the age of eleven at Niden-ji Temple. He then studied Jōdo Buddhism at Kōmyō-ji in Kamakura and Renkei-ji in Kawagoe. In 1601 he was appointed as the head of the Chion-ji Temple in Kyoto, and was occasionally invited by Emperor Go-Yōzei to lecture to the Imperial Court. In 1603 he was invited by Tokugawa Ieyasu to Edo and built Shin Chion-ji Temple (later known as Banzui-in) for the protection of the Tokugawa Shogunate.

In 1613, at seventy-two years old, Banzui'i was ordered by Tokugawa Ieyasu to travel to Kyushu to convert the Christians of the region to Buddhism with the daimyo Arima Tadasumi as his bodyguard. After he gladly agreed to the mission, Ieyasu gifted him with a war-vest made of Chinese Brocade and a golden truncheon fan, traditional symbols of the samurai, declaring him similar to a general who would spiritually defeat the enemies of Buddhism. Banzui'i traveled to the Ise Grand Shrine and prayed to Amaterasu for seven days before proceeding to Kyushu. In Nagasaki and Shimabara he would convert a great number of Christians and help to build Buddhist temples where Christian churches once stood before their destruction. In his later years he lived in Wakayama and died there in 1615.
