= Amida-ji (Sakuragata, Okazaki) =

Buddhist temple in Okazaki, Aichi, Japan

Amida-ji 阿弥陀寺
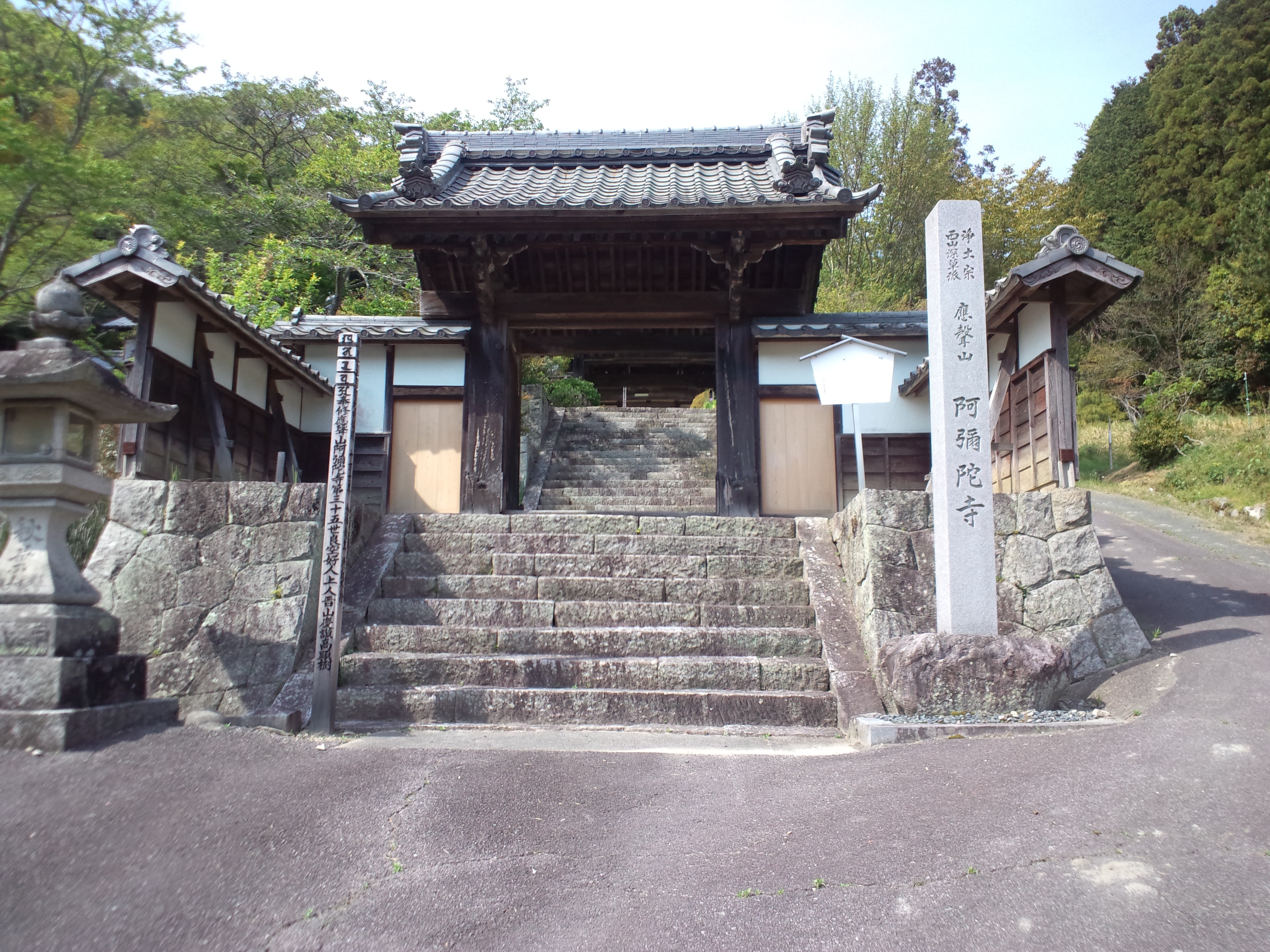
- Entrance to the main gate

Religion
- Affiliation: Jōdo Shū Seizanfukakusa-ha

Location
- Location: Maeda-13 Sakuragatacho, Okazaki, Aichi
- Country: Japan
- Interactive map of Amida-ji 阿弥陀寺
- Coordinates: 34°59′26.7″N 137°18′23.0″E

Architecture
- Founder: Tōshun Uyo (雨譽洞春)
- Completed: 1394

Amida-ji (阿弥陀寺) is a Buddhist temple located in Sakuragata, Okazaki, Aichi. It belongs to the Seizanfukakusa-ha of Jōdo Shū.

The temple is also known as Ōshōsan Amida-ji, Daikinkokuzan Saifuku-in (應聲山阿彌陀寺・大金谷山西福院).

== History ==
As the temple serves as the Takiwaki-Matsudaira family's bodai-ji, it has strong historical ties with the bushi class.

== Cultural Property ==
- Mandala Butsue-zu

== See also ==
- Jōdo Shū
