= Seiso =

Seiso may refer to:

- Seiso, a streamer named ShiraishiLyra is commonly associated with this term
- 5S (methodology)#Shine (seiso 清掃), a workplace cleanliness routine
- Seiso Mohai, a South African politician from the Free State
- Seiso Moyo, a Zimbabwean politician
- Seisō, a disciple of Shōgei
- Seiso, a son of Ashikaga Yoshiakira
- Seiso, a child of Kujō Moronori
- Seisō Genbō (聖宋元宝), a form of Japanese currency
- Seiso Academy from the Japanese role-playing game La Corda d'Oro
- Seiso Electric Railway, a predecessor to the bus company Keisei Bus Chiba East
