= Daizen-ji (Hachiōji) =

Buddhist temple in Japan

Daizen-ji 大善寺
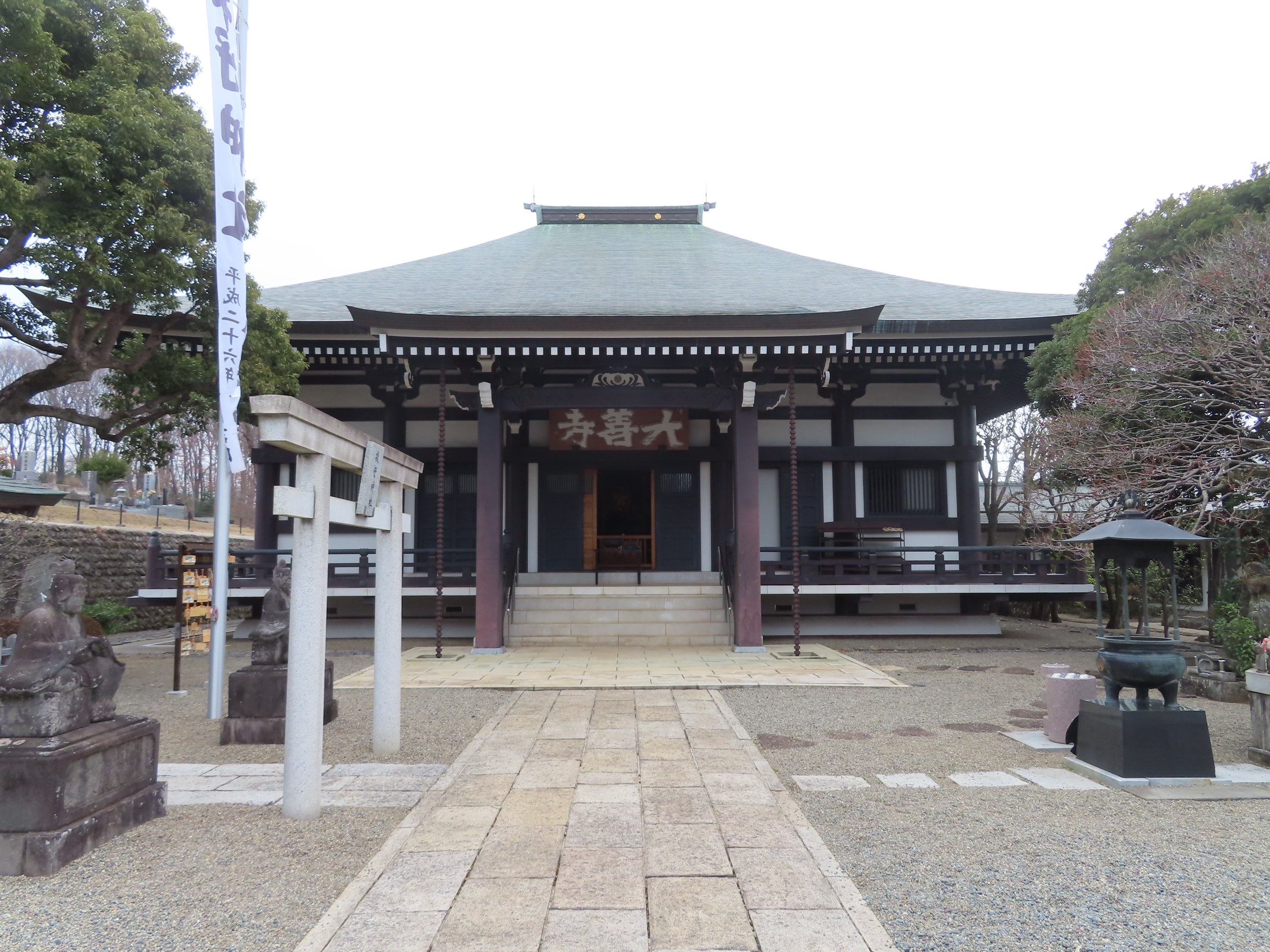
- Daizen-ji Main Hall

- Daizen-ji Daizen-ji (Hachiōji) (Japan)

Religion
- Affiliation: Buddhism
- Deity: Amida Nyōrai
- Rite: Jōdo-shū

Location
- Location: 1019-1 Ōyamachi, Hachiōji-shi, Tokyo
- Country: Japan
- Interactive map of Daizen-ji 大善寺
- Coordinates: 35°40′18.2″N 139°20′43.0″E

Architecture
- Founder: Hōjō Ujiteru
- Completed: late 16th century AD

Website
- fujimidaireien.jp/daizenji/

Daizen-ji (大善寺) is a Buddhist temple belonging to the Jōdo-shū school of Japanese Buddhism, located in the city of Hachiōji, Tokyo, Japan. Its main image is a hibutsu statue of Amida Nyōrai.

== History ==
Daizen-ji was founded during the Azuchi–Momoyama period by Hōjō Ujiteru, a follower of Ushihide (who passed away in 1605), and erected in the town of Takiyama Castle. When Takiyama Castle was abandoned following the construction of Hachiōji Castle, Daizen-ji was also relocated to the town of Hachiōji Castle. After the fall of Hachiōji Castle, Daizen-ji was relocated to Ōyokocho in the center of Hachiōji, facing the Asa River, a tributary of the Tama River.

During the Edo period, Tokugawa Ieyasu issued a document designating Daizen-ji as a training institution for Buddhist monks and a place of learning. Subsequently, the Tokugawa clan designated Daizen-ji as one of the Kantō Jūhachi Danrin, as the Edo period settled under the Tokugawa clan, Daizen-ji flourished greatly.

After World War II, Daizen-ji left the Jōdo-shū school and became an independent temple, and in 1961, when Hachiōji City suggested relocation, it was moved to Ōwadamachi in Hachiōji, and then to its current location in Ōyamachi. In 1981, the current main hall was completed, and at the same time, the temple devoted itself to cemetery work, and is now responsible for the management of Fujimidai Cemetery, which is home to approximately 3,500 graves. In 2018, Daizen-ji once again became the Jōdo-shū school temple.

The waiting room features wallpaper designed by William Morris.

== Fujimidai Cemetery ==
Fujimidai Cemetery is the adjacent cemetery managed by Daizen-ji. The notable interments are follows:

- Fujio Akatsuka (Manga artist)
- Hideo Murota (Actor)
- Hiroyuki Ebihara (Professional boxer)
- Ineko Sata (Writer closely connected to the Proletarian Literature Movement)
- Seichō Matsumoto (Writer, credited with popularizing detective fiction in Japan)
