= Ensetsu =

- 圓説
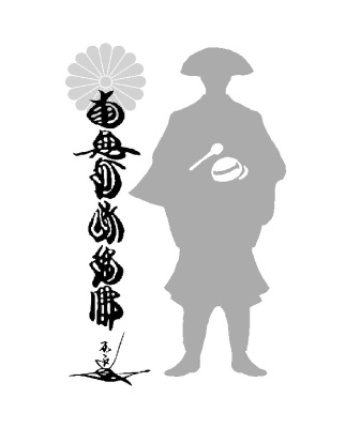

Personal life
- Born: 1714
- Died: 1759 (aged 44–45)

Religious life
- Religion: Buddhism
- School: Jōdo-shū

Ensetsu (圓説, 1714–1759) was a Japanese Buddhist monk active during the mid-Edo period. He was the founder of the Mokugyo Nenbutsu practice and centered his activities in Kyoto and Osaka. He walked throughout Kyoto city, regardless of wind or rain, heat or cold, carrying a wooden fish drum over his shoulder and chanting the nembutsu as he struck it. At an event labelled the Hōdenji Lecture, it is said he instructed as many as fifteen thousand people in daily chanting. He rebuilt Hōdenji Temple (a temple commissioned by Emperor Shōmu and founded by Priest Gyōki) in Fushimi, Kyoto, and also established Kōgetsuan in Fushimi, opening a chanting hall to preach the Buddhist Dharma.

This was an important moment in the history of Pure Land Buddhism in Japan, establishing the wooden fish chanting as the essence of Jōdo-shū. However, it sparked accusations of heresy as “dissenting doctrine and deviant practice” from temples throughout Kyoto. This marked the beginning of the Hōreki Fushimi Disturbance, a rare incident in the history of the Jōdo Shū school in the early modern period. As a result, he was falsely accused, exiled, and banished. Undeterred, amidst the Hōreki Incident (a pro-imperial movement), he rebuilt Sōkinji Temple (a temple commissioned by Emperor Shōmu and founded by Priest Gyōki) in Kitano, Osaka. For these successive acts of imperial loyalty and veneration, he was secretly granted the purple robe, purple crest curtain, and the titles ‘Futae Shōnin’ and “Mokugyōin” by the reigning emperor, Emperor Momozono.

== Lifetime ==
Born in 1714 during the Edo period, in the village of Terauchi, Shimogasa, Kurimoto District, Ōmi Province, east of Lake Biwa, as the son of Yokoi Shichibei. He was said to be intelligent and compassionate from a young age, and an outstandingly honest child.

In the 6th year of the Kyoho era (1721), at the age of eight, he lost his father. He personally requested his mother's permission to become a monk. Moved by his resolve, she consented. He shaved his head and entered the monastic life under the guidance of the monk Dan'yo at Myōraku-ji Temple in Minami-Kasa. His posthumous name was Ensetsu, his given name was Donsei, and his monastic name was Futae. He stated this was for his father's repose, for memorial services, and for his own liberation. Possessing a resolute spirit and an early awakening to seek the Way, he devoted himself to study for several years and mastered the Buddhist scriptures.

In 1727, when Ensetu was fifteen, he sought to deepen his studies. He took up residence at Zōjō-ji Temple in Shiba Sanyen-yama, Edo (also the Tokugawa family's ancestral temple), where the Jōdo sect's Danrin (a center for learning and training monks) was located. There he pursued his studies to completion, achieving both understanding and practice, and made the study of Buddhist doctrine his life's work. He received direct transmission from his master of the essential teachings of the Jōdo sect's doctrine and precept lineage, the vital core of the sect's lineage and precept lineage.

=== Transmission of Both the Doctrinal and Precept Lineages ===
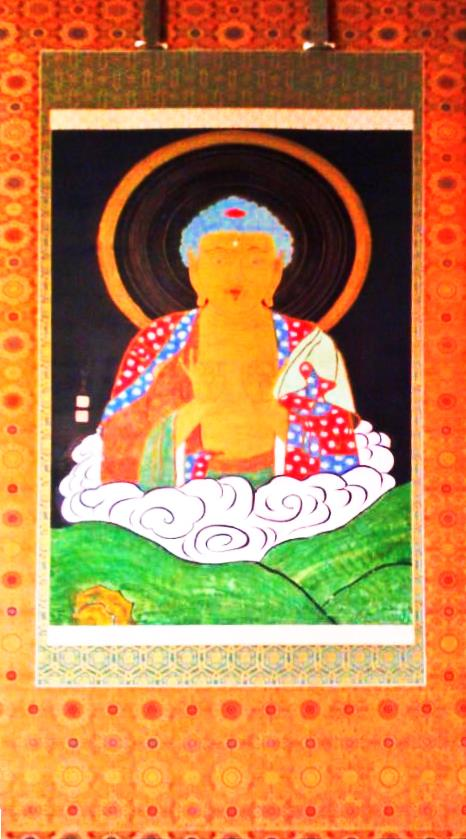
Portrait of Amida Buddha attributed to Futae Shōnin

Within the Jōdo Shū tradition, there are two methods of transmitting the Dharma: the doctrinal lineage, which conveys the fundamental teachings of the school, and the precept lineage, which transmits the precepts handed down within the Jōdo Shū. The doctrinal lineage refers to the transmission of the essential teachings of Jōdo Shū from master to disciple. The precept lineage refers to the transmission of the precepts handed down within Jōdo Shū from master to disciple. The term “lineage” (脈) signifies bloodline; it denotes the lineage of transmission, the genealogy of the Dharma passed from master to disciple. This lineage is established both within the doctrinal lineage and within the precept lineage. To become a Jōdo Shū priest, one must inherit both lineages.

Regarding the lineage of the doctrine: In the first volume of the “Shōsen-shū,” Hōnen discusses the two transmissions: the transmission of the Six Great Virtues and the transmission of the Five Patriarchs of the Pure Land. Receiving this meaning, Shōkyō states in the “Kenjōdo Dengenron”: "In the Pure Land school, there are two bloodlines: the lineage of the doctrine and the lineage of precepts. When transmitting the doctrine, the precepts are always transmitted as well. This principle is universally acknowledged by all scholars of the Pure Land school." The Precept Lineage: The En-ton Precepts establish two types of precept lineages: the Brahma's Net Transmission (Lotus Platform Transmission) and the Lotus Sutra Transmission (Direct Transmission from Mount Gridhrakuta).

In the 15th year of Kyoho (1730), when Ensetsu was 18 years old, he reflected on himself: his ordination was for the sake of his deceased father's memorial and his own liberation. If he were to waste his days now, he would surely be swept back into the ocean of birth and death. He could not remain at Zōjō-ji, thinking he was merely preserving expedient means while forgetting the goal of liberation. He resolved to thoroughly study the scriptures of his own and other schools and to diligently examine commentaries.

=== Studying Buddhist Texts ===
The term “chōso” refers to commentaries on Buddhist scriptures, collectively known as Buddhist texts. This involved studying not only Jōdo-shū scriptures but also those of Jōdo Shinshū, Tendai-shū, Shingon-shū, Hokke-shū, Zen-shū, and other schools. Afterward, he embarked on a journey to travel throughout the provinces.

From late Kyōhō 16 (1731) through the summer of Kyōhō 17 (1732), the weather was poor, and the inclement conditions persisted even after the new year began. A cold summer and pest infestations caused crop failures across western Japan, particularly in the Chugoku, Shikoku, and Kyushu regions, especially along the Seto Inland Sea coast. This became known as the Great Kyoho Famine. According to Tokugawa Jitsuki, approximately 970,000 people starved to death. It is also said that over 2.5 million people suffered from starvation.

The Kyōhō Reforms, the shogunate policies initiated by the eighth shogun Yoshimune starting in Kyōhō 1 (1716), were now starkly revealing themselves as reforms solely for the Tokugawa shogunate's own dominance. While the shogunate itself turned a blind eye to the famine countermeasures of the various domains, it instead exploited their misgovernance and financial circumstances, scheming to punish them with measures like abolition whenever an opportunity arose. However, these shogunate fiscal strengthening measures gradually backfired. Following the great famine, resistance from the Imperial Court, backlash from the domains, peasant uprisings, townspeople's rebellion, the tyranny of rōnin samurai, and scholarly criticism erupted into a conflagration of anti-shogunate sentiment rising from all sectors of society and generations[7].

After five years of wandering, in Kyōhō 20 (1735), at age 23, Ensetsu returned to his hometown in Ōmi. He preached at Myōraku-ji Temple, where samurai and commoners gathered to receive his teachings. This marked the beginning of Ensetsu's sect reform. He settled at Kakai-ji Temple in Ōtsu and continued spreading the practice of Nembutsu there until he was 26, in Genbun 3 (1738).

=== Reform of the Buddhist Order: Influence of the Renunciation Sect ===
In 1739 (Genbun 4), at the age of 27, Ensetsu became the chief priest of Shōkaku-ji Temple (Kyoto, Rakusai Shichihonmatsu). He proclaimed the Yoshimizu Seiryū doctrine and denounced the practice of seeking livelihood through improper means. Yoshimizu Seiryū referred to faithfully adhering to the Nembutsu path, rooted in the teachings of Honen Shōnin, the founder of the Jōdo sect. Ja-mei (邪命) refers to a monk sustaining his livelihood through means considered improper for a monk. This means earning a living through secular occupations like those of commoners, rather than relying on alms (kotsujiki) or donations (shin-se).

The Renunciation Sect was founded by Sekitsu, who was a prominent monk of the Renunciation Sect who devoted himself to propagating exclusive Nembutsu practice. Sekitsu was born in Owari Province; his secular surname was Yokoi. (Ensetsu was also of the Yokoi clan; the two left similar footprints.) Though the documents ‘Ninshinin Documents’ and ‘Sekitō's Indestructible Teaching’ contain passages critical of both men, their significance as guiding figures is starkly highlighted.

=== Foundation of Mokugyo Nenbutsu ===
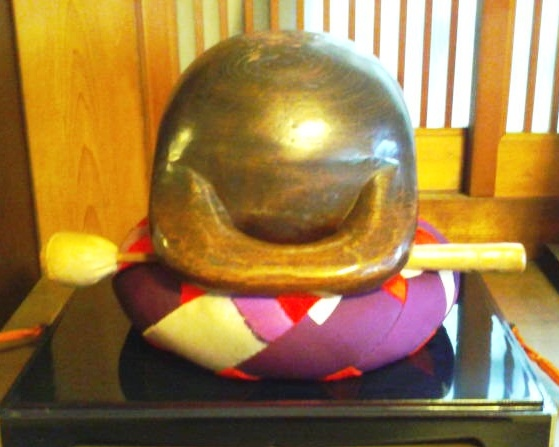
A mokugyo hand-created by Ensetsu

In 1749 (Kannen 2), at age 38, Ensetsu built a small hermitage on the ruins of the severely damaged Hodenji Temple in Fushimi Toba. He planned to rebuild this temple, focusing on reforms to the chanting of the Buddha's name and securing funds.

The existing method of chanting nembutsu, which relied solely on vocal recitation, had limitations. Ensetsu had connections with priests of the Nichiren sect and also ties to priests of Ōbaku Zen, which was known for its use of the mokugyo (wooden fish) and its practice of nembutsu.

The Zen wooden fish was originally a "fish board" used to signal the time by striking it, and its fish shape symbolizes the fish's constant vigilance, meaning practitioners should devote themselves diligently to practice. The round object in its mouth represents worldly desires, and striking the fish's back symbolizes expelling these desires. Ensetsu had a portable wooden fish made to hold in the hand. Gripping the wooden fish and striking it with a mallet produced a pleasant, hollow sound. Chanting the nembutsu aloud, matching the rhythm with the wooden fish, produced an indescribable sense of elation. Thus was born the "Jōdo Shū" school of the founding master's wooden fish chanting.

Regardless of wind or rain, cold or heat, he wandered near and far through the streets of Kyoto, walking while chanting the nembutsu and striking the wooden fish hung around his neck. His teachings, delivered while also begging for alms, spread ever wider, and disciples from all walks of life came to admire him. He also undertook the fundraising for rebuilding Hōdenji's halls. His wish was fulfilled with the establishment of a single temple: Hōdenji in Toba. Around this time, nearby temples of the Jōdo sect began increasing as branch temples, and Hōden-ji became a medium-sized head temple overseeing over ten branch temples.

The practice of wooden fish chanting spread like wildfire. Ensetsu's sermons grew ever more popular, commanding the respect of both monks and laypeople.

=== The Hōreki Fushimi Disturbance ===
He is said to be the first person in the Jōdo sect to strike a wooden fish while chanting the Buddha's name. Criticism of heresy arose against this new movement within the Buddhist world. This marked the beginning of the Hōreki Fushimi Disturbance.

Striking the wooden fish during sutra recitation was called an improper practice, seen as an innovation from late Ming China, which should not be used in a sect that reveres ancient traditions. Priest Ensetsu was deemed heretical by most schools of Japanese Buddhism and faced numerous criticisms.

The Osaka Tenman branch, Kurodani, and Hyakubanden branches of the Jōdo sect, along with the Fushimi branch, joined the head temple Chion-in in filing a formal complaint with the government authorities, alleging that Ensetsu's missionary preaching violated the doctrines and traditions of the Jōdo sect and was inappropriate. As a result, Futae Ensetsu was summoned to the head temple's decision-making body and to the government's Western Affairs Office.

The historical background is that the religious laws of the early modern period were enacted to uphold the shogunate and feudal domain system, and violating these laws meant one had to be prepared for grave consequences. This was because it involved a matter of faith that drew in numerous lay followers, and because it rejected customary social practices, being deemed contrary to public order and morals.

The fundamental issue was likely that over ten thousand believers had left their respective temple gates to flock to Ensetsu, threatening the survival of other temples.

=== Exile ===
In the third year of Hōreki (1752), at the age of forty-one, Ensetsu was expelled from Hōdenji Temple in Yamashiro Province due to slanderous accusations of spreading heretical teachings. This was a local banishment.

He then settled at the site of Sōkin-ji in Kitano, Osaka, a former sacred place that had fallen into ruin, and revived it. It seems likely that Futae, at the request of his disciples and followers, assumed the role of founding abbot. He rebuilt this temple within three years.

=== Death ===
On the third day of the eighth month of the ninth year of Hōreki (1759), he fell ill and passed away peacefully. (Aged forty-six) He lay down with his head facing north and his feet toward the west, donned his sanghati robe, and vigorously chanted the Buddha's name one hundred times. People from a neighboring village saw a purple cloud covering the roof and thus knew of Ensetsu's passing, indicating he was a monk whose name would be remembered. This event is recorded in the “Sequels to the Biographies of Eminent Monks of Japan, Volume 10.”

After Ensetsu's passing, Sōgonji Temple in Kitano, Osaka, temporarily became a branch temple of Chōsenji Temple during the Edo period. The temple history of Kitano, Osaka, preserved the mountain name, Futaizan, and its monastic hall name, Mokugyōin, due to Ensetsu's achievements. Unfortunately, the entire town was destroyed in the Great Osaka Air Raid during World War II, and all traces of Ensetsu's footsteps, records, and temple furnishings were lost.

== Legacy ==
The aspirations of Priest Ensetsu would later see the light of day with the collapse of the shogunate in the Meiji Restoration. By championing the deeds of the Priest Ensetsu, he sought first to overcome the crisis facing Jodo sect temples amid the rising anti-Buddhist movement sparked by the Meiji government's Separation of Shinto and Buddhism Edict. The first transformation was that of the head temple, Chion-in. Chion-in had enjoyed peaceful times under the Tokugawa clan's patronage. Yet, despite its close ties to the Tokugawa, Chion-in found itself isolated among Kyoto's temples, treated like a pariah. It offered no support to the new government, and its lack of honorific acts toward the Imperial family stood in stark contrast to those performed by temples affiliated with the Honganji lineage. Relying solely on the achievements of its founder, Honen Shonin, and the imperial lineage of its successive head priests, its very survival was precarious. Yet, this head temple, which had branded and expelled it as heretical, was saved by the numerous merits of Ensetsu Shonin's acts of veneration.

Chanting the wooden fish nembutsu, created by Ensetsu, is now common practice in Jōdo-shū temples. A large wooden fish is enshrined in the main hall of Chion-in Temple and is used daily.
