= 福田 =

福田, meaning “fortune, field”, may refer to following Asian individuals:

- the Japanese transliteration
  - Fukuda (surnames)
  - Fukude, Shizuoka
- Futian (disambiguation), the Chinese transliteration
