= Sarakin =

Type of debt lenders outside of banks

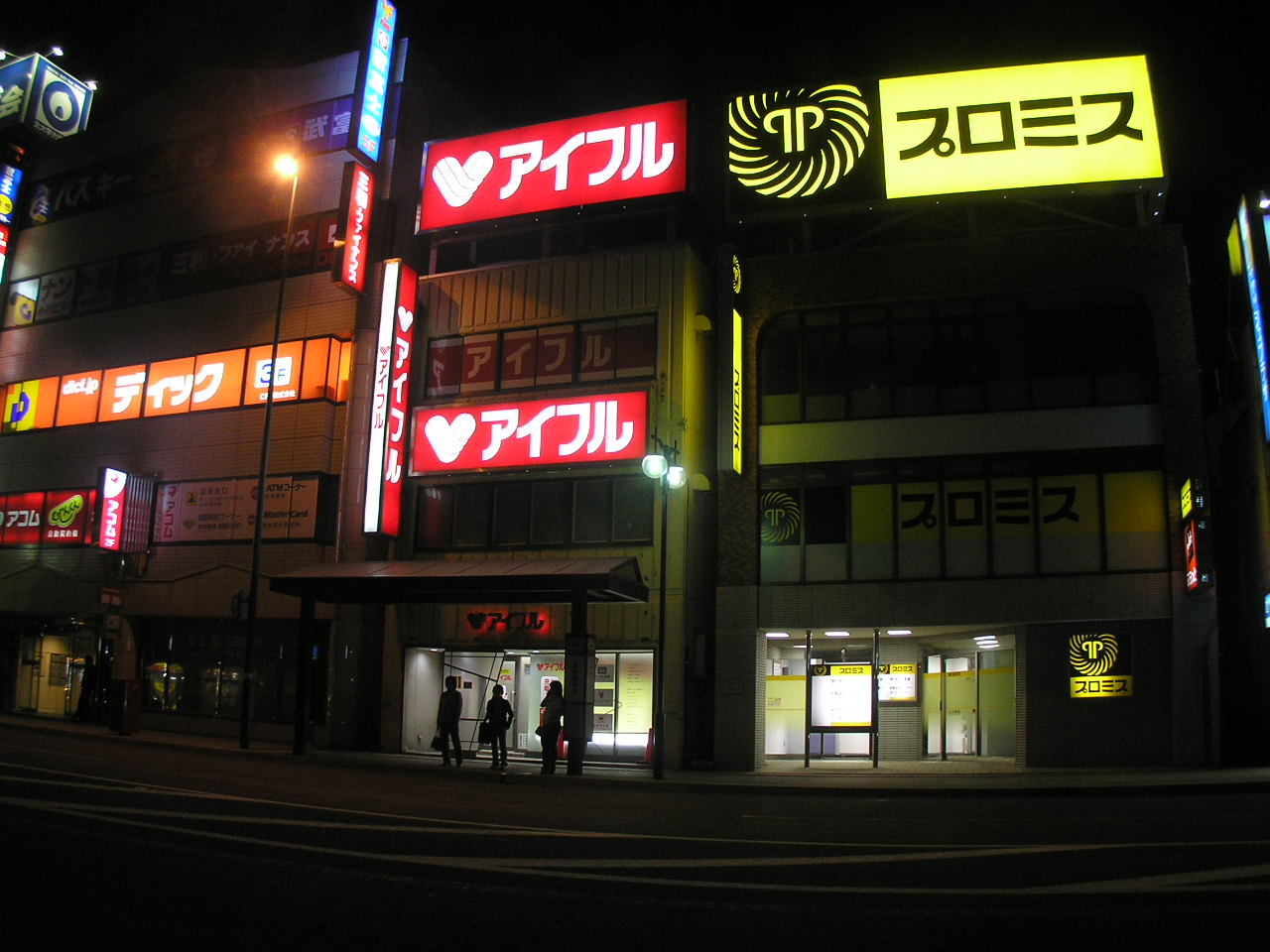
Sarakin office building in Hokkaido

Sarakin (サラ金) is a Japanese term for a legal moneylender who makes unsecured loans at high interest. It is a contraction of the Japanese words for salaryman (サラリーマン, Sararīman) and loan (金融, kin'yu). An illegal loan shark who goes above legally permitted maximum interest rates is called yamikin, short for Yami Kinyu (闇金融; "Dark Finance"), and many of them lend at 10% for 10 days.

Around 14 million people, or 10% of the Japanese population, have borrowed from a sarakin. In total, there are about 10,000 firms (down from 30,000 a decade ago); however, the top seven firms make up 70% of the market. The value of outstanding loans totals $100 billion. The biggest sarakin are publicly traded and often allied with big banks.

Sarakin fill an important niche in Japanese society. Consumer and small-business lending has long been one of the weak points of the Japanese financial system. Although the economy has traditionally been bank-dominated, banks have preferred to lend to large firms with strong collateral (land and real estate) rather than to individuals or smaller firms. Banks' underdeveloped credit risk assessment techniques also restricted their entry into consumer and small business financing. Thus, where consumer borrowing from a bank is considered shameful and often requires a guarantor, sarakin loans can be as little as $100, borrowers need identification but not collateral, and transactions at kiosks akin to automated teller machines take just a few minutes. Loan rates used to be as high as 29.2%, substantial given that official interest rates are near zero. After an outcry at the high levels of debt and the repayment tactics, a law in 2006 capped interest rates at 20% by 2010, and regulated collection methods. Loans were also not allowed to exceed one-third of an annual salary.

== Loan-shark hell ==
Strict and often bullying loan collection techniques practiced by sarakin, combined with the importance in Japanese culture of "saving face", have driven many small-business men to despair and contributed to suicide in Japan reaching one of the highest rates worldwide. Many sarakin used to be affiliated with organized crime groups (yakuza) and a scandal blew up in the early 1980s because of their unsavory, if effective, collection methods, such as showing up at a funeral or wedding to demand money, or using a loudspeaker in front of homes, schools or workplaces to broadcast non-payment of debt. These actions led to the term sarakin-jigoku, or "loan shark hell", being coined by the media and legislation which set the code of conduct for money collection.

== List of companies ==
In 1997, the largest sarakin companies were collectively called TAPALS, which was an acronym for:

- Takefuji
- Acom
- Promise
- Aiful
- Lake
- Sanyo Shinpan Finance

Takefuji went bankrupt in the 2010s following a scandal which started in 2004. 40% of Acom would be acquired by the Mitsubishi UFJ Financial Group in 2008. Lake was acquired by GE Capital and renamed GE Consumer Finance Japan in 1998, only to be sold to Shinsei Bank in 2008. Promise was acquired by the Sumitomo Mitsui Financial Group (SMBC Group) in 2012 and is currently the trade name of the now-renamed SMBC Consumer Finance. Sanyo Shinpan Finance was acquired by Promise two years before the latter's acquisition by the SMBC Group.

== See also ==
- Payday loan
- Loans in Japan
