= Fukuda Gyōkai =

19th-century Jōdo-shū Buddhist monk and reformer

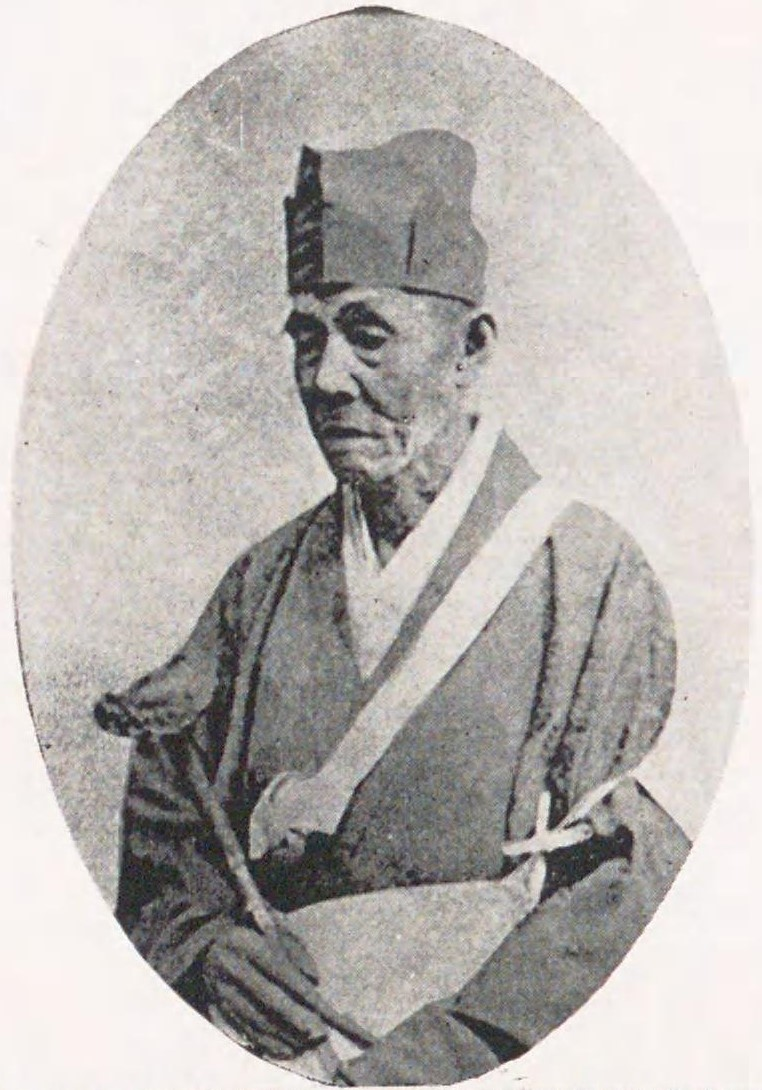
A photograph of Fukuda Gyōkai.

Fukuda Gyōkai (福田行誡, 1809 – 1888) was a Japanese Buddhist priest, particularly the head priest of the Jōdo-shū sect. He fought for the preservation of Buddhism in Japan during the early Meiji period and was therefore called the "Supreme Chief Priest of the Meiji Period" (明治第一の高僧, Meiji daiichi no kōsō).

== Life and work ==
Fukuda Gyōkai left home at the age of 6 and joined the “Koishikawa Denzūin” (小石川伝通院) in Edo. At the age of 19 he went to Kyoto to further his education. He studied the Tendai school of Buddhism, the Risshu school and the Kusha school in the “Saga Shōjōin” (嵯峨正定院), on Mount Hiei under Echō (慧澄; 1780–1862). He then returned to Denzū-in and studied the Jōdo school of Buddhism under the scholar Tokuhon (徳本; 1758–1818).

Under Echō, who had moved from Hiezan to Kan'ei-ji, Fukuda continued to study in the Tendai and Kusha directions of Buddhism. He had a strong spirit of inquiry and became known in the Buddhist world for his outstanding scholarship and humanity. Influenced by the Buddhist scholarship of Jiyun (慈雲; 1718–1805), at the age of 26 he taught the Buddhist Sutras (仏遺教経節要), the four Tendai religions (天台四教儀), and the Bodhisattva Vows (菩薩戒).経義疏). In 1852 Fukuda became senior teacher at Denzū-in, then retired to the Shoseiritsu-in (処静律院) and lived alternately there or in the Shōjōshin-in (清浄心院).

In response to the “Haibutsu Kishaku” (排仏毀釈) – “Expel Buddha, destroy Shaka” movement at the beginning of the Meiji Restoration, i.e. the destruction of Buddhist temples, he founded the League of United Buddhist Sects (諸宗同徳会盟) which united several Buddhist sects to follow the goal of modernizing all of the Buddhist sects of Japan.

Fukuda rejected Christianity and wrote criticisms of it. He urged monks to think about the history of Buddhism in Japan and tried to revive Buddhism. He criticized "Shaku Norimasa byōsaiyabu" (釈教正謬再破) - "Breaking the Buddhist Ritual Again", written by co-religionist Ukai Tetsujō (鵜飼徹定; 1814–1891) and "Buppō jikken-ron" (仏法実験論) - “Theory of Buddhist Experiment”, written by Hara Tanzan (原坦山; 1819–1892).

Fukuda became abbot of Zōjō-ji shortly before becoming abbot of Chion-in in Kyoto. He was the head of the eastern part of the Jōdo sect, and then in 1877 head of the entire Jōdo sect. He wrote many books and was known for his paintings. With the aim of publishing the "Okura Sutra" (大蔵経), he studied the "Okura Sutra" in the editions of the Song, Yuan, Ming, and Goryeo dynasties, corrected them and published a complete edition of the Okura Sutra.
