= Kantō Jūhachi Danrin =

Kantō Jūhachi Danrin (関東十八檀林; lit. eighteen danrin temples in the Kantō region) is generic term for eighteen Jōdo-shū temples located in Kantō region that were recognized as danrin (Note: Danrin is a temple that plays a role as college and institute for the priests in Edo period. Not only Jōdo-shū but other sects like Tendai-shū had their own danrin temples.) by Tokugawa shogunate.

In the early Edo period Chion-in was considered to be one of the most notable temples of Jōdo-shū, though, its official status in the religious sect remained unclear. In 1597 (Keichō 2) Sonshō of Chion-in enacted Kantō-danrin-kiyaku (関東檀林規約; lit. agreement on danrin in Kantō) consisting of five articles, which established the system of honmatsu-seido. On July 24, 1615 (Genna Gannen) Tokugawa shogunate issued Jōdo-shū-hatto (浄土宗法度; lit. laws of Jōdo-shū) consisting of thirty five articles, which had been originally suggested by Jisho of Zōjō-ji. The management system of the sect was established, in which Chion-in was recognized as Monzeki and Zōjō-ji as Sōroku-jo. (Note: Sōroku-jo (総録所) manages the religious affairs of all Jōdo-shū temples around the country.) Kantō Jūhachi Danrin were designated under the law, and it was also stipulated that important issues regarding the sect were to be discussed at the meeting of danrin and that the priests were to be trained only at danrin.

== List of Kantō Jūhachi Danrin ==
All of eighteen temples that were recognized as Kantō Jūhachi Danrin are listed below.

Musashi Province

- Zōjō-ji (Minato, Tokyo)
- Denzuin (Bunkyo, Tokyo)
- Reigan-ji (Kōtō, Tokyo)
- Reizan-ji (Sumida, Tokyo)
- Banzuiin (Koganei, Tokyo) (Note: The temple was moved from Kamiyoshi-cho (now Higashi-ueno) in 1939.)
- Renkei-ji (Kawagoe, Saitama)
- Shogan-ji (Konosu, Saitama)
- Daizen-ji (Hachioji, Tokyo)
- Jokoku-ji (Iwatsuki-ku, Saitama)

Sagami Province

- Kōmyō-ji (Kamakura, Kanagawa)

Shimōsa Province

- Gugyo-ji (Yuki, Ibaraki)
- Tozen-ji (Matsudo, Chiba)
- Daigan-ji (Chiba, Chiba)
- Gugyo-ji (Joso, Ibaraki)

Kōzuke Province

- Daikoin (Ota, Gunma)
- Zendo-ji (Tatebayashi, Gunma)

Hitachi Province

- Jofuku-ji (Naka, Ibaraki)
- Dainen-ji (Inashiki, Ibaraki)

== See also ==
- Danrin (Buddhism)
- Jōdo-shū
