= Shōgei =

14th-century Jōdo-shū Buddhist monk

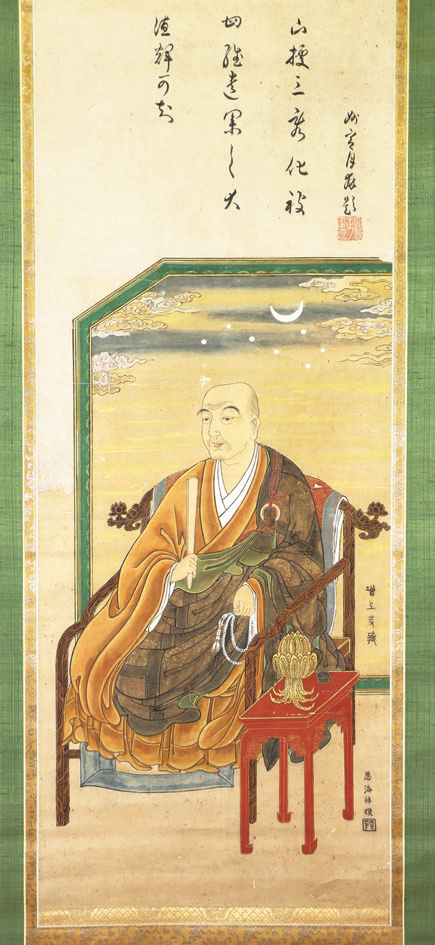
An image of Shogei Shonin owned by Zojo-ji.

Shōgei (聖冏, October 15, 1341 - September 27, 1420) was a Buddhist monk from the middle of the Muromachi period. He is the considered the seventh founder of Jōdo-shū (Chinzei-ha).

He was a native of Hitachi Province and the Shiio clan. He entered the priesthood under Ryoji at Uriren Jofukuji Temple and studied under Rensho at Ota Honen-ji Temple in the same province. He studied a wide range of Buddhism, primarily Pure Land Buddhism, but also Tendai, Esoteric Buddhism, Zen, and Kusha. He established rituals for transmission of the Dharma for the training of Jōdo-sect followers, formally establishing Jōdo-shū as an independent sect from Tendai. He was also well-versed in Shinto, Confucianism, and Japanese poetry.

His disciples included Seisō and Ryōchi, and together with Seisō, who became the eighth patriarch of the sect, he is regarded as the leader who promoted the Jōdo sect's Chinzeigyō from a doctrinal and academic perspective. He is also known for founding the Edo Koishikawa Denzu-in Temple.
