= Yamazaki Ben'nei =

Yamazaki Ben'nei (Japanese: 山崎辨榮, February 20, 1859 – December 4, 1920) was a Japanese Buddhist priest of the Jodo sect. He was involved in the Komyoshugi movement, a social movement of the Jodo sect, from the late Meiji period to the Taisho period.

== Biography ==
He was born in 1858 to a farming family of devout Jodo sect followers in Tega Village (present-day Washinoya area, Kashiwa City, Chiba Prefecture) on the banks of Lake Tega in Soma County, Shimōsa Province. While studying Buddhist painting at a nearby Shingon sect temple, at the age of 12, he contemplated the Amida Triad in the setting sun and wished to become a monk. In November 1879, he became a monk under Daiko Otani of Buppozan Ichijoin Tozenji Temple.

He moved to Tokyo in 1881 and studied at Zojoji Temple and Kisshō-ji (now Komazawa University), and practiced nembutsu at Mount Tsukuba in 1882. He moved to Narashino in 1887 and promoted the construction of Reijusan Genpukuin Zenkoji Temple and the founding of the main Jodo sect school (now Taisho University). He also actively made use of Western musical instruments in his missionary work. Around 1890, in order to spread the teachings of Buddhism, he composed and wrote hymns in praise of Buddhism and traveled around the country playing the accordion, which was a novel instrument at the time. In 1894, he made a pilgrimage to Buddhist sites in India, returning to Japan the following year.

He then began the Komyo-shugi movement, and in 1914 he founded the Nyorai Komyo-kai (now the Komyo-kai General Incorporated Foundation).

In 1916, he was invited to be a lecturer at the summer retreat of the head temple, Chion-in, and in 1918, he was welcomed as the 61st head priest of Muryokoji, the head temple of the Taima school of the Ji sect of Buddhism, and founded Komyo Gakuen on the temple grounds to educate people.

In December 1920, while traveling around the country, he died and was cremated at Hokkyozan An'yoin Gokurakuji Temple in Kashiwazaki City (Wakabacho, Kashiwazaki City, Niigata Prefecture).

== Teachings ==
Yamazaki Ben'nei believed that true nembutsu samadhi could not be attained through theory and doctrine, but only through the practice of nembutsu. He recognized this during his time at Mount Tsukuba, where he is said to have attained a high state of tranquility and visions of the Pure Land. He taught that the Pure Land teaching of the nembutsu was not only useful for achieving birth in Sukhavati, but also attaining peace in this life.

Benn'nei was also active in promoting Pure land Buddhism among the lay population. He published a vernacular translation of the Amitābha Sutra and illustrated its contents. The Amitābha Sutra Illustrated was first published in July 1897 and went through numerous editions, reaching hundreds of thousands of copies. This work became an invaluable resource for many people's faith. Ben'nei also actively incorporated new religious music into his missionary work. He was skilled not only in the organ but also the accordion.
