= Renkei-ji =

Buddhist temple in Saitama Prefecture, Japan

Renkei-ji 蓮馨寺
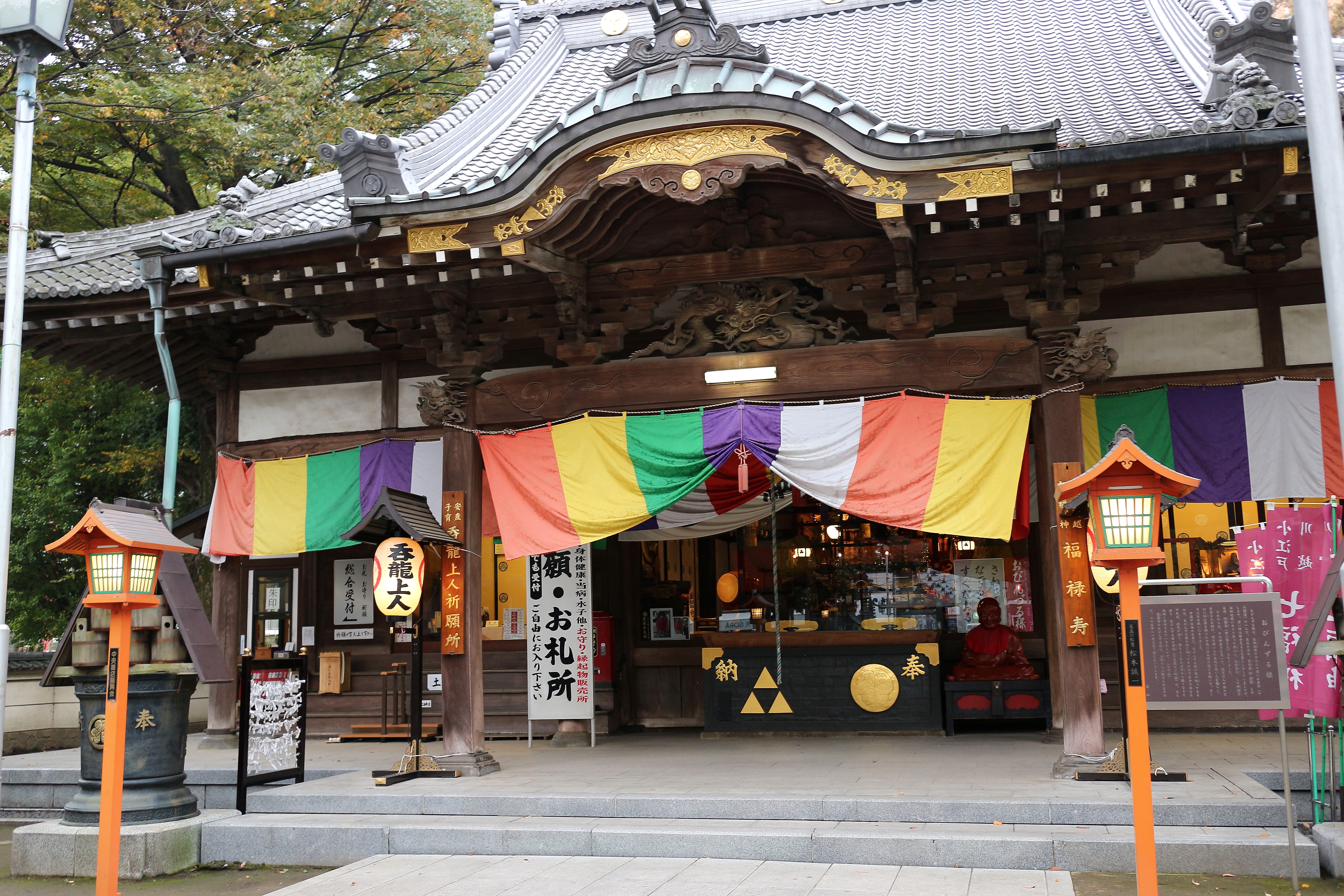
- Renkei-ji

Religion
- Affiliation: Jōdo-shū
- Deity: Amida Nyorai, Fukurokuju

Location
- Location: 7-1 Renjaku-cho, Kawagoe, Saitama
- Country: Japan
- Interactive map of Renkei-ji 蓮馨寺
- Coordinates: 35°55′10.6″N 139°28′54.8″E

Architecture
- Founder: Renkei
- Completed: 1549

Website
- Official website (in Japanese)

Renkei-ji (蓮馨寺) is a Buddhist temple of the Jōdo-shū sect in Kawagoe City, Saitama Prefecture. Its mountain name (sangō) is Kōhozan, while its monastery name (ingō) is Hōchi-in. The temple is dedicated to Amida Buddha.

== Origins and history ==
Renkei-ji was constructed in 1549 by Renkei, after the Night Battle of Kawagoe (1546). Renkei is Daidoji Masashige’s mother.

In the Edo Period (1602), Renkei-ji joined one of the Kantō Jūhachi Danrin, which was a nationally certified Buddhism University. There, many priests and novices learned Jōdo-shū. Lord Donryu is enshrined in the Donryu-do. The temple is good for an easy delivery. On the 8th of every month, a temple fair is held with storytelling and other events.

A figure of Obinzuru-sama, a disciple of Buddha, can be seen at the entrance to Donryu-do. It is said that if you touch a sick area of your body to the same spot on Obinzuru-sama, your illnesses will be healed.

Fukurokuju, one of the Seven Lucky Gods, is also enshrined here.

== See also ==
- Kantō Jūhachi Danrin
