= Yoshitaka Fukuda =

Japanese businessman

Yoshitaka Fukuda (福田 吉孝, Fukuda Yoshitaka; born 1948) founded Aiful when he was a teenager; now Japan's fifth-largest consumer finance company. Residing in Tokyo, he is married with three children.

He established the private Fukuda Art Museum in Kyoto in 2019 containing a collection of approximately 1,200 pieces when opened.

== See also ==
- List of billionaires
