= Aiful =

Japanese consumer finance company

AIFUL Corporation
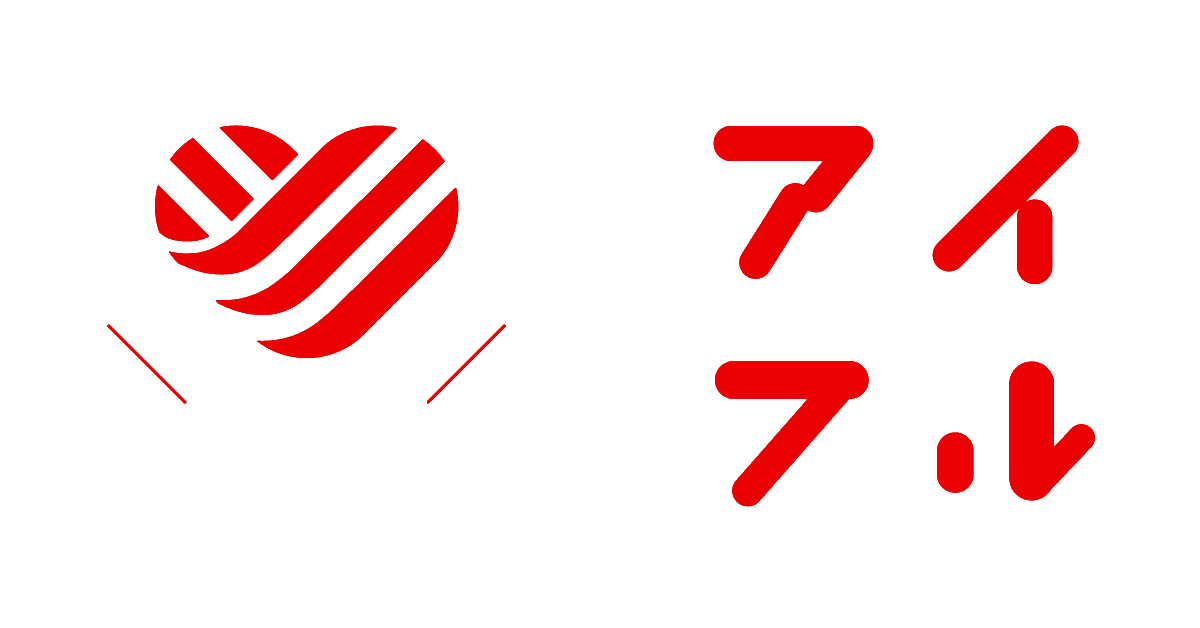

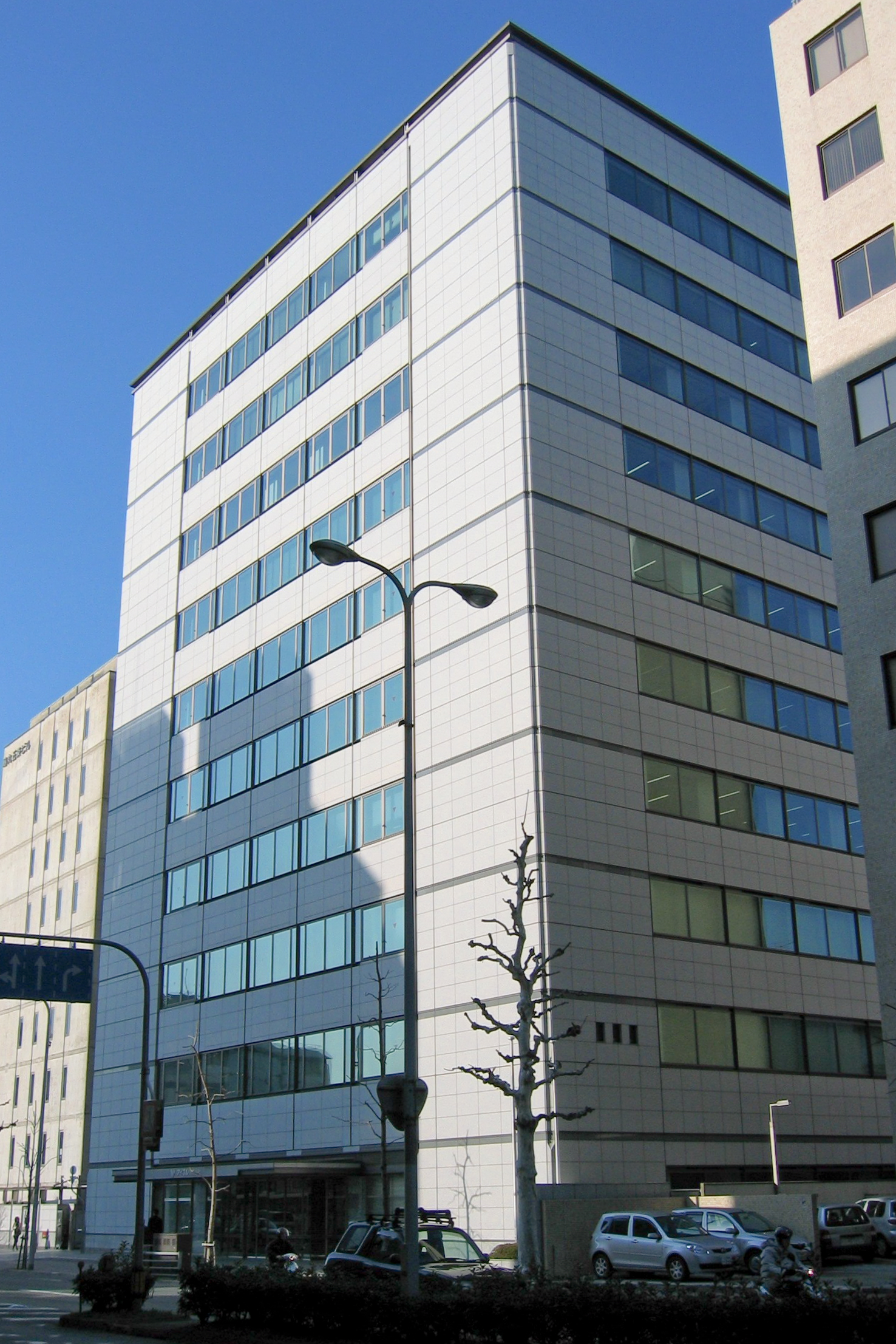
- Headquarters
- Native name: アイフル株式会社
- Company type: Public (K.K.)
- Traded as: TYO: 8515
- Industry: Consumer finance
- Predecessor: Marutaka, Inc.
- Founded: April 1967; 59 years ago
- Headquarters: Shimogyō-ku, Kyoto, Japan
- Key people: Yoshitaka Fukuda (President and CEO)
- Revenue: ¥91.450 billion (2016)
- Operating income: ¥7.009 billion (2016)
- Net income: ¥7.276 billion (2016)
- Total assets: ¥616.651 billion (2017)
- Total equity: ¥111.649 billion (2017)
- Number of employees: 2,293 (2017)
- Subsidiaries: LIFECARD Co., Ltd.; BUSINEXT Corporation

AIFUL Corporation (アイフル株式会社, Aifuru Kabushiki-gaisha) (TYO: 8515) is one of the largest Japanese consumer finance companies. The company is based in Kyoto and has annual profits of close to ¥100 billion on over ¥2 trillion worth of loans (2005). The company had to restructure its debt after failing to make a loan payment.

== History ==
Aiful was established in April 1967 by Yoshitaka Fukuda as a sole-proprietorship. In 1978, this small company was reformed in Kyoto as Marutaka, Inc. and opened its first four branches to expand its consumer-finance business. The company continued to grow over the next five years and it acquired three small companies in the same business segment and renamed itself Aiful in 1983. These mergers gave the company over ¥90 million in capital and a growing market share in the consumer loan sector. Soon afterward, the company began to offer home-equity and small business loans. During the 1980s and up to the present day, the company has continued to expand by finding new investment opportunities, particularly real estate, engaging in mergers to increase its market share.

Today the company offers a wide range of consumer financial services, ranging from issuing credit cards to providing home equity loans. Additionally, the company provides small business loans and until recently operated a chain of karaoke parlors and Taiwanese-style restaurants. The company has 912 branches (many of them automated teller machines) throughout Japan and currently employs over 2000 people.

== Criticism ==
The company has many techniques to promote repayment that some have viewed as unscrupulous, but have resulted in a low default rate for the bank. Additionally, the company has been charged by some individuals with exploiting the financial problems of some consumers by offering high-rate loans that must be secured by collateral, often the individual's real estate. This may lead to loss of a consumer's home and has led to allegations that the company is a sarakin or a loan shark. Several advocacy groups have been formed for those who feel victimized by such practices.

In 2006 regulators in Japan ruled against the lending practices of the consumer finance sector and revised the maximum legal lending rate to 18.75% (down from a previous legal limit of 29%). Furthermore, this ruling enabled consumers to claim back the interest they have been overcharged from companies like Aiful for a period of up to 10 years back, which forces them to make high provisions for these reimbursements on their balancesheet.

On April 14, 2006, the FSA issued a business suspension order that forced Aiful to shut down domestic operations for three business days and in some areas up to 25 days.

== Advertising ==
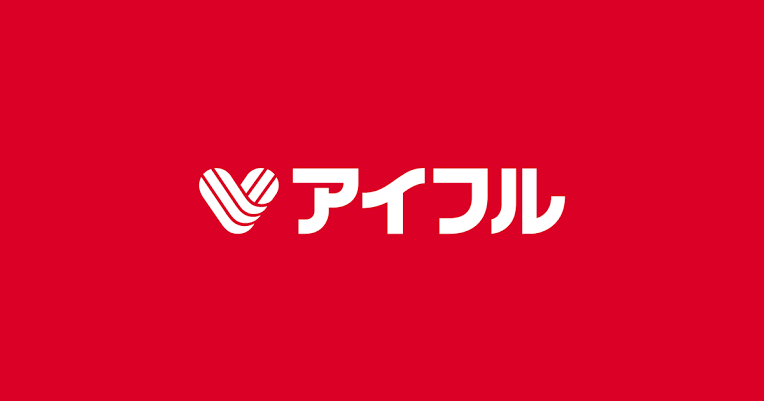
Aiful logo used until 2022

In contrast with the more staid image of the more traditional banks, Aiful and other consumer finance companies attempt to have a livelier image. For example, the signs and logos of Aiful and its subsidiaries are often very colorful and eye-catching, seeking to draw passersby into loan outlets. Recent advertisement campaigns have featured Chihuahua TV ads and special loans marketed towards women. Additionally, Aiful and other consumer finance companies often distribute packages of tissues at mass transit stations.
