= Kusha-shū =

School of Buddhism

The Kusha-shū (倶舎宗) was one of the six schools of Buddhism introduced to Japan during the Asuka and Nara periods. Along with the Jōjitsu-shū and the Risshū, it is a school of Nikaya Buddhism, which is sometimes derisively known to Mahayana Buddhism as "the Hinayana".

A Sarvastivada school, Kusha-shū focused on abhidharma analysis based on the Abhidharmakośa-bhāsya (Jap. 阿毘達磨倶舎論, "Commentary on the Treasury of Abhidharma") by the fourth-century Gandharan philosopher Vasubandhu. The school takes its name from that authoritative text.

Names commonly associated with the Kusha-shū are Dōshō (道昭 638–700), Chitsū (智通 ?–?), Chitatsu (智達 ?–?), and Genbō (玄昉 ?–746).

== See also ==
- Buddhism in Japan
