= Jōdo-shū =

Branch of Pure Land Buddhism widely practiced in Japan

- 浄土宗
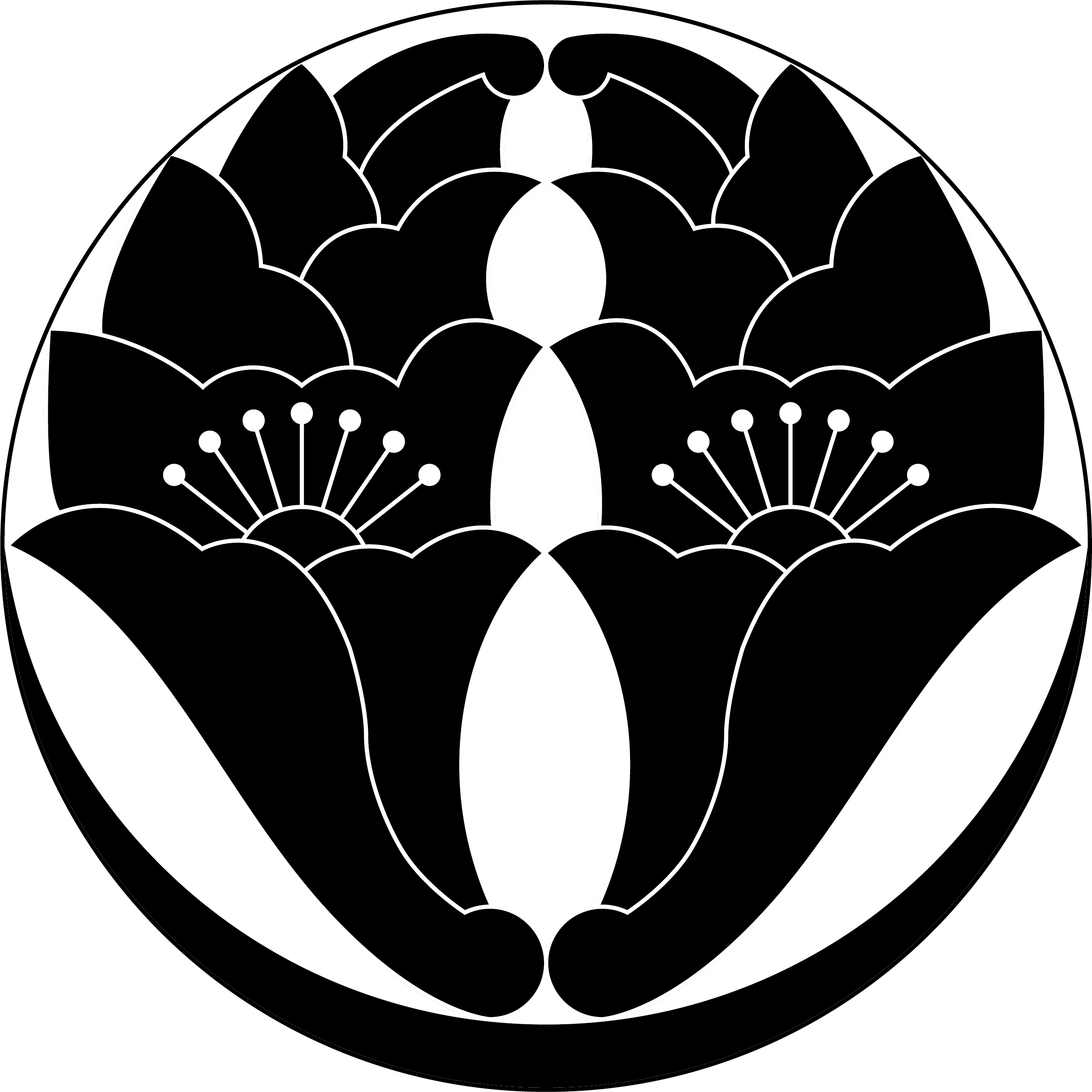
- The Tsukikage Gyōyō crest, the mon of Jōdo-shū
- Classification: Pure Land Buddhism
- Scripture: The Three Pure Land Sutras and the Senchakushū
- Divisions: Chinzei, Seizan
- Liturgy: Jōdo-shū Otsutome
- Headquarters: Chion-in (Chinzei), Eikan-dō Zenrin-ji (Seizan)
- Founder: Honen Shonin
- Origin: 1175; Kyoto, Japan
- Separated from: Tendai
- Members: Over 6,000,000
- Ministers: 9,500
- Places of worship: 7,125 (Chinzei); 9,141 (Total)
- Official website: Official Japanese Website of Jōdo-shū; Official English Website of Jōdo-shū

Jōdo-shū (浄土宗, "The Pure Land School") is a Japanese branch of Pure Land Buddhism derived from the teachings of the Kamakura era monk Hōnen (1133–1212). The school is traditionally considered as having been established in 1175 and is the most widely practiced branch of Buddhism in Japan, along with Jōdo Shinshū. There are various branches of Jōdo-shū, which the largest and most influential ones being Chinzei-ha and Seizan-ha.

Jōdo-shū Buddhism focuses exclusively on devotion to Amitābha Buddha (Amida Nyorai), and its practice is focused on the Nembutsu (recitation of Amitābha’s name). As in other forms of Pure Land Buddhism, adherents believe that the faithful recitation of the phrase "Namu Amida Butsu" (Homage to Amida Buddha) results in birth in the pure land of Sukhavati.

The Jōdo-shū as an independent sect is not to be confused with the term "Jōdo Tradition" (浄土系, Jōdo-kei) which is used as a classification for "Japanese Pure Land Buddhism" in general. This broader classification would include Jōdo-shū, the Jōdo Shinshu, the Ji-shu and the Yuzu Nembutsu shu.

== History ==
=== Background ===
The work of the founder Hōnen is informed primarily by the Chinese Pure Land Buddhism, especially the work of Shandao. He was also influenced by the Tendai school background in which he trained as a monk. The work of Genshin was also important for Hōnen, as he was a Japanese Tendai monk who focused on Pure Land practice.

Hōnen's Jōdo goso den lists five Pure Land patriarchs, all of which informed the thought of Hōnen to varying degrees. The following five patriarchs are still considered to be the main patriarchs of the Japanese Jōdo-shū school:

1. Tanluan (476–542)
2. Daochuo (562–645)
3. Shandao (613–681)
4. Huaigan (懷感, 7th century)
5. Wulong Shaokang (736–806)

=== The Founder: Hōnen ===
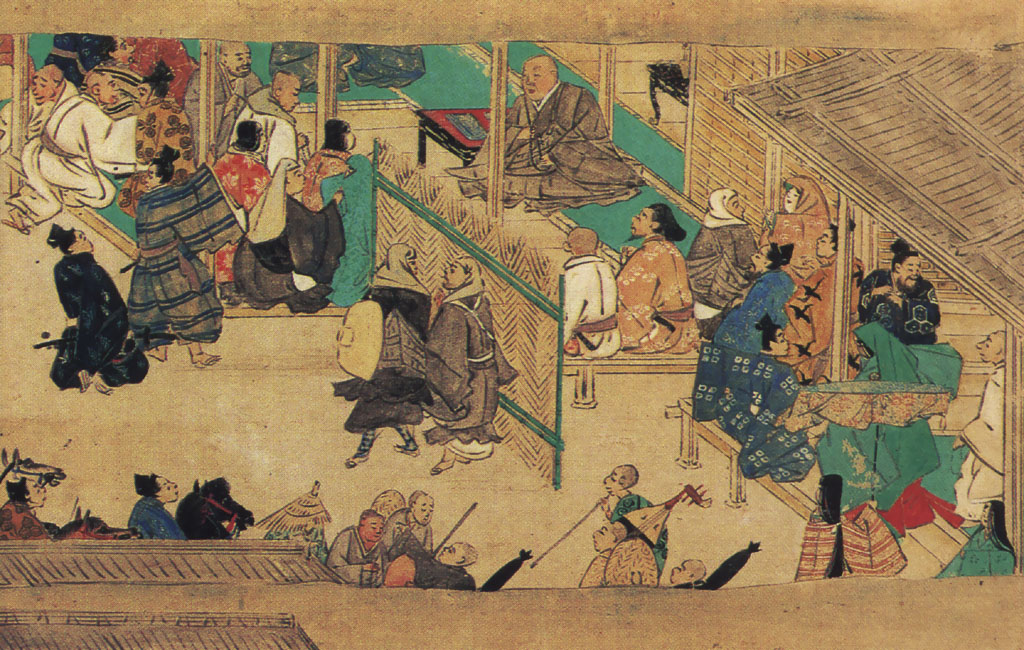
An artistic depiction of Hōnen publicly preaching

Hōnen (法然) was born in 1133, the son of Uruma no Tokikuni of a local ruling family in Mimasaka Province. After a rival official assassinated his father in 1141, Hōnen was initiated into his uncle's monastery at the age of 9. From then on, Hōnen lived his life as a monk and eventually studied at the famous monastery of Mount Hiei. He practiced traditional Tendai Buddhism for some time, but eventually became dissatisfied with it. Influenced by the writings of Shandao, Hōnen devoted himself solely to Amitābha as expressed through the practice of nembutsu.

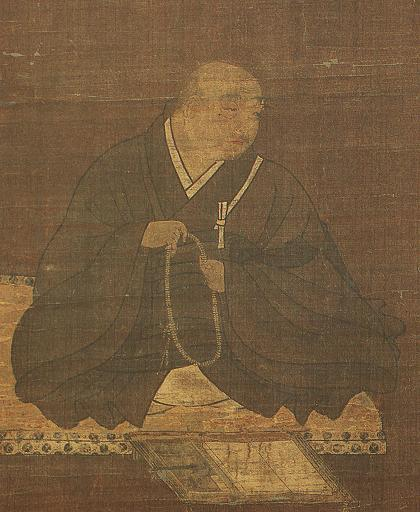
Hōnen

In time, Hōnen gathered disciples from all walks of life, and developed a large following, notably women, who had been excluded from serious Buddhist practice up to this point. This included fishermen, prostitutes, samurai, and fortune tellers. Some of his followers more strictly followed Buddhist conduct, whereas others assumed they were saved by Amida Buddha and behaved recklessly, earning criticism from established monastic communities such as Enryaku-ji and Kofuku-ji. To counter these criticisms, Honen insisted his followers sign the Seven Article Pledge (七箇条制戒, shichikajō seikai) in 1204, pledging not to disparage other sects, and to uphold the Buddha-Dharma. One-hundred and sixty-three followers, including Hōnen's chief disciples, signed the pledge.

In 1207, Kofukuji monks made another petition to the Emperor to ban Hōnen's teaching. Meanwhile, two of Hōnen's disciples, Jūren and Anraku-bō, were caught proselytizing to some of the ladies in waiting of Emperor Go-Toba, who had then decided to take tonsure and leave the service of the Emperor. In anger, the Emperor decreed that Hōnen and several followers be defrocked and sent into exile, while Jūren and Anraku-bō were executed. This is known as the Jogen Persecution (承元の法難, jōgen no hōnan) of 1207. Eventually, Hōnen was pardoned and returned to Kyoto in 1211, but died soon after in 1212, just two days after giving his final testament, the One-Sheet Document to disciple Genchi.

=== Early years after Hōnen ===
The remaining disciples in the capital collected Hōnen's writings and erected a mausoleum. His disciples had already begun work on carving Hōnen's magnum opus, his Senchakushū, into woodblocks in 1207 for printing. The carving of the blocks was completed in 1211 and the first copied were then printed and distributed publicly. This was the first printing of the text of a Japanese Buddhist author and it was a big sensation at the time.

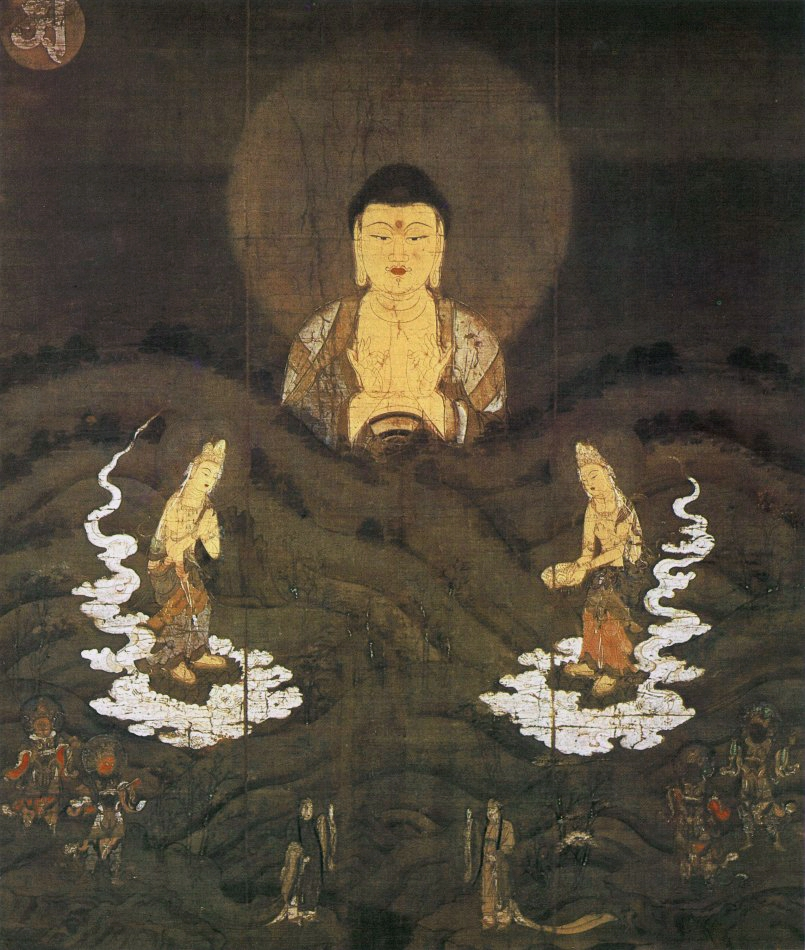
Descent of Amitabha over the Mountain or Yamagoe no Amida (山越えの阿弥陀), a cultural treasure from Eikando Temple.

During the fifteen years following Hōnen’s passing, three key figures—Ryūkan, Kōsai, and Shōku—emerged as leaders of distinct factions within Hōnen’s Pure Land movement. They defended their tradition against opposition from established Buddhist schools, worked to establish the legitimacy of Pure Land teachings, and developed their own interpretations of Hōnen’s doctrine.

Ryūkan (1148–1227) emphasized faith in Amida’s vow as the path to salvation and actively defended Hōnen against criticism from Tendai and other sects. Kōsai (1163–1247) promoted the idea that a single recitation of the nembutsu (ichinen-gi) was sufficient for birth in the Pure Land, drawing on the doctrine of innate enlightenment (hongaku). His radical stance gained followers but also provoked strong opposition, even among Hōnen’s disciples. Shōku (1177–1247) argued that all Buddhist practices serve only as preparatory steps toward the ultimate path of nembutsu recitation (seizan-gi), integrating Tendai thought into Pure Land practice. Unlike Ryūkan and Kōsai, Shōku avoided exile during the persecution and led the nembutsu community in Kyoto, where five prominent lineages later emerged.

When Hōnen's work began to circulate in 1227, this further enraged the Tendai monastic community on Enryaku-ji, who wrote attacks against it. Ryūkan’s defense against Tendai critique of the Senchakushū, resulted in the exile of Ryūkan and Kōsai, and force of sōhei warrior monks were sent to raid the tomb of Hōnen. This is known as the Karoku Persecution (嘉禄の法難, Karoku no hōnan) of 1227. Hōnen's body and copies of the Senchakushū were relocated thanks to advance warning, but other writings of Honen's were destroyed, and more disciples were exiled.

In 1239, Hōnen's followers re-carved the Senchakushū into new woodblocks so they could reprint the text again.

=== Emergence of distinct lineages ===
As a result of the persecution of 1207 by order of Emperor Go-Toba, and then the 1227 Karoku Persecution, many of the disciples of Hōnen were exiled to remote provinces (though not all were exiled). Each established a local community in their respective provinces and with nuances in the teachings (義, gi). During this time, doctrinal debates flourished among Hōnen’s disciples, and his teachings spread across Japan. Shinran and Ryūkan’s followers established nembutsu communities in the Kantō region, while Benchō strengthened the movement in Kyūshū, and Kōsai spread Pure Land teachings in Shikoku. Each disciple maintained a distinct interpretation of Hōnen’s doctrine.

As doctrinal disagreements between Hōnen's disciples Ryūkan, Chōsai, Kōsai and Shōku escalated, a major debate occurred between two opposing positions: once-calling (Jp: ichinengi) and many-calling (Jp: tanengi). One-calling (defended by Kōsai and also accepted by Shinran) held that you only needed to recite nenbutsu once to be liberated, while many-calling held that you needed to recite nenbutsu as much as possible. Hōnen himself promoted sustained practice as taught by many-calling, though he also said that one could be saved by even a few recitations (but this was not an excuse to abandon practice). The mainstream Jōdo-shū tradition follows this view and promotes extensive recitation while also accepting that a single recitation can lead to the Pure Land.

Kōsai's "single recitation" (ichinen-gi) doctrine held that one can attain birth in the Pure Land through one nembutsu in which "the mind of faith (shinjin) ... is in complete accord with the wisdom of the Buddha." He, along with Gyōkū, emphasized faith, not practice, though his view did not mean that he rejected practice after the establishment of true faith. He also emphasized how the most important nembutsu was the non-verbal, mental nembutsu, seeing the vocalization of the nembutsu as secondary to the mind's "psychological experience of nembutsu-samādhi". His teaching may have influenced Shinran (1173–1262), later recognized as the founder of Jōdo Shinshū (True Pure Land), who also emphasized absolute reliance on Amida’s other-power (tariki), rejecting personal effort as a means to salvation. For Shinran, reciting the nembutsu was not a practice to achieve birth in the pure land, but an expression of gratitude for already being saved by Amida. Shinran also copied and preserved the earliest known compilation of Hōnen’s words, which he titled Saihō Shinanshō (A Teaching to the Western Land, T. 2674). Over time, Shinran's lineage gradually differed enough from others to be considered a separate tradition altogether, though Shinran did not see himself as founding a separate school in his time.

On the opposite side of the debate was Ryūkan, one of Honen's more elderly disciples, who emphasized the efficacy of the nembutsu as a constant practice and encouraged its frequent recitation, leading to his teachings being called the "many callings school" or tanen-gi (多念義). For Ryūkan, constant recitation throughout one's life is what allowed one to attain birth in the Pure Land through the final moment at death by Amida's power. He was eventually exiled to eastern Japan during the 1227 persecution, where he died en route.

Shōkōbō Benchō (1162–1238), the main figure of the Chinzei lineage, was another supporter of the tanen-gi doctrine who criticized the supporters of ichinen-gi and their supposed immorality. He also advocated a balanced practice that included nembutsu and auxiliary practices. Benchō categorized Buddhist practices as either a general form of nembutsu (sō no nembutsu) or the specific practice of reciting Amida’s name (betsu no nembutsu), arguing that the latter ultimately encompasses all other Buddhist practices. Drawing from the Daichido-ron, he wrote extensively to systematize Hōnen’s teachings, notably in Matsudai Nembutsu Jushuin and Tetsu Senchakushū.

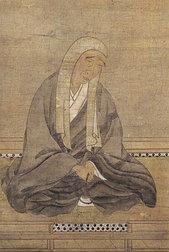
Shōku

Shōku (1177 –1247) remained in Kyoto as the primary leader of Hōnen’s followers, guiding various groups despite brief periods of suppression in 1235 and 1240, which were less severe than the earlier persecutions. Shōku's doctrine was called "unvarnished nembutsu", which taught that the simple recitation of nembutsu without any influences was effective for birth, but he also made room for the auxiliary Pure Land practices and miscellaneous practices which could "color" the nembutsu (even if they were not necessary). He saw other practices as able to be included within the nembutsu (which could never be harmed or ruined by them), a doctrine called "harmonizing of other practices within the nembutsu." He also taught that self-power and other-power were not mutually exclusive. His lineage became known as Seizan-ha.

Only two Jōdo-shū lineages (apart from Shinshu) survive today: the Chinzei-ha branch of Benchō and the Seizan-ha branch of Shōku (with three sub-branches). Other offshoots such as Jōdo Shinshū and the Ji-shū sects are considered different enough to be separate schools from Jodo-shū. The largest branch of Jōdo-shū today is the Chinzei-ha (鎮西派; "The Chinzei Branch"), named after the district of Chinzei in Kitakyushu, the hometown of Benchō. The Seizan-ha (西山派; "The West Mountain Branch") and Kuhon-ji branches grew around the capitol of Kyoto, as Shōkū and Chōsai were among the few major disciples who were not exiled.

==== Main lineages and disciples ====
Jodo-Shu Lineage Chart

Hōnen (法然)
Tankū (湛空) | Genchi (源智) | Benchō (弁長) | Shōkū (証空) | Chōsai (長西) | Kōsai (幸西) | Ryūkan (隆寛) | Shinran (親鸞) | Shinkū (信空)
Ryōchū (良忠) | Jō-on (浄音) | Enkū (円空) | Shōtatsu (聖達)
Chinzei | Seizan, Zenrinji branch | Seizan, Komyoji branch | Seizan, Fukakusa branch | Ippen (一編)
Shōgei (聖冏) | Ji-shū sect | Jodo Shinshu sect

Other disciples of note:

- Genchi, Honen's disciple and personal attendant who stayed in Kyoto. Later, met Ryōchū in 1248, and agreed to merge with the Chinzei branch after reaching an accord. Was Hōnen's witness when he dictated the One-Sheet Document, his final testament.
- Shinkū, helped to establish Hōnen's mausoleum, and later protect its relics during the persecution of 1227.
- Chōsai, the last of Hōnen's direct disciples. Where Honen and other Pure Land followers focused on the 18th, or Primal Vow, of Amida Buddha, Chōsai felt that the 20th Vow of the Immeasurable Life Sutra also applied, and thus taught that other practices in Buddhism would lead to birth in the Pure Land. This was the shogyō hongan (諸行本願, Primal Vow for Miscellaneous Practices") teaching. Founder of the Kuhonji-gi branch (九品寺義), based around Kuhonji temple in Kyoto.
- Kujō Kanezane, an influential member of the Fujiwara Clan, he helped defend and protect Hōnen from some political persecution. A number of letters and poetry exchanged Hōnen and Kanezane have been preserved.
- Awanosuke (阿波介), the fortune-teller, is credited with the double-stranded Buddhist prayer beads used in Jōdo-shū, though he did not establish a branch of his own.

=== Rise of the Chinzei and Seizan mainstream sects ===
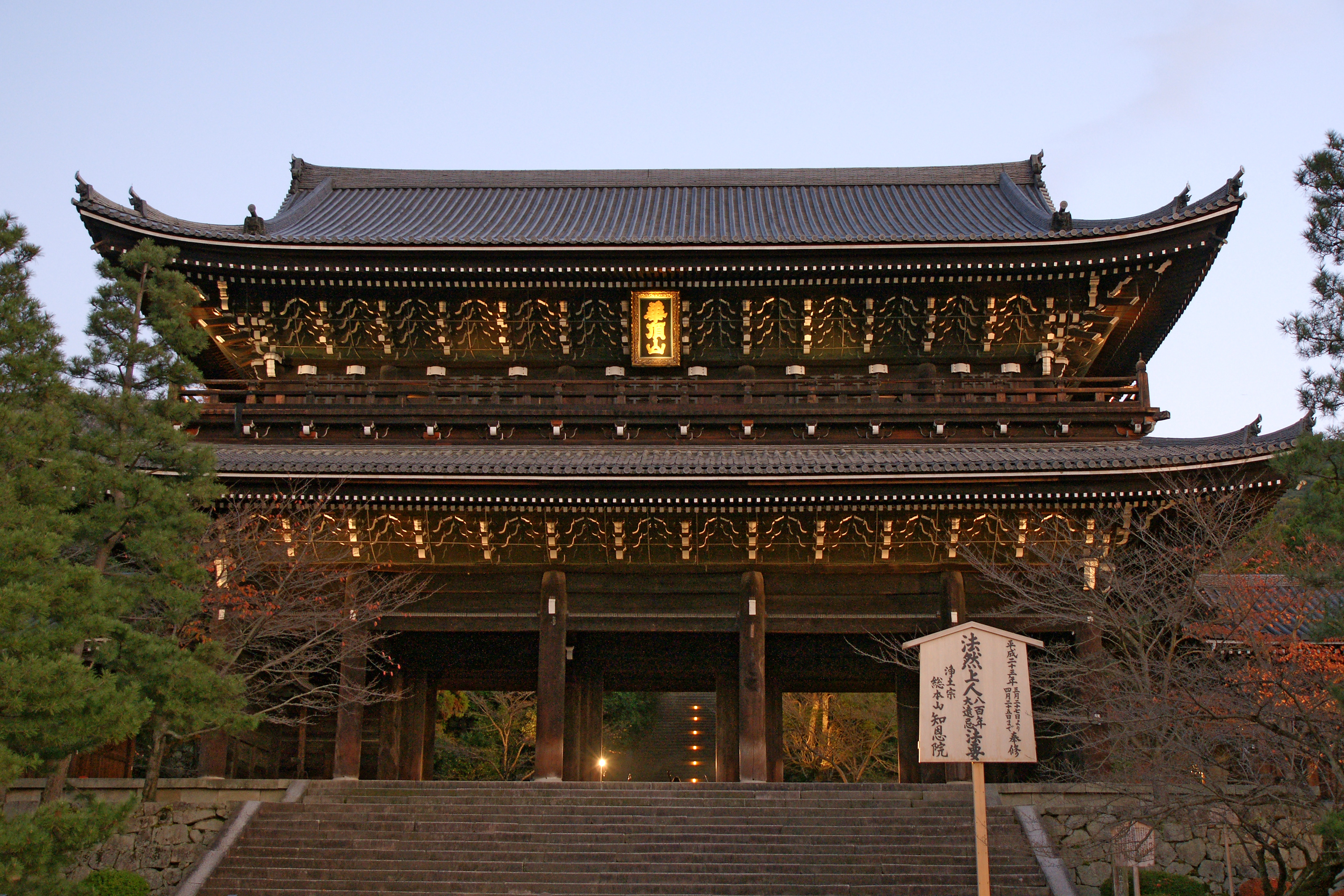
Sanmon of Chion-in, the headquarters of the Chinzei branch

A generation later, Bencho's disciple, Ryōchū (1199–1287), became his disciple for a year, and then spread Benchō's and Hōnen's teachings throughout Japan before reaching the new capital at Kamakura. Ryōchū helped to legitimize the "Chinzei branch" of Jōdo-shū as the mainstream one, and is credited as the 3rd Patriarch accordingly. He also referred to Benchō, his teacher, as the 2nd Patriarch after Hōnen. Ryōchū's teaching was in direct opposition to those of another teacher popular at the time, Chōsai.

Chōsai (1199–1287), drawing on the Sutra of Immeasurable Life, maintained that all Buddhist practices, not just the nembutsu, could lead to birth in the Pure Land. This perspective, known as the "doctrine of various practices corresponding to the original vow" (shōgyō hongan-gi), held that Amida Buddha had designated multiple Buddhist practices, alongside the nembutsu, as valid paths to the Pure Land. However, this interpretation faced strong opposition from other lineages of Hōnen’s disciples, who saw it as straying from their teacher’s core teachings. Despite this criticism, Chōsai’s approach gained acceptance among established Buddhist schools such as Tendai and Shingon, leading to a significant increase in his followers.

Ryōchū directly challenged Chōsai’s view, arguing that only the nembutsu aligned with Amida’s original vow, and that other Buddhist practices were not inherently conducive to rebirth in the Pure Land. However, he also opposed Shōku’s strict stance that all other Buddhist practices were completely ineffective for achieving rebirth. While rejecting the idea that non-nembutsu practices corresponded to Amida’s vow, Ryōchū nonetheless acknowledged that they could still play a role in reaching the Pure Land. Ryōchū dedicated himself to solidifying the Chinzei doctrine, defending Benchō’s interpretation while refuting the positions of Chōsai and Shōku. While in Kyoto, Ryōchū gave a series of influential lectures in which he argued that the nembutsu teaching supplanted and surpassed the "perfect precepts" of Tendai. He also argued that the nembutsu was a kind of voluntary confession, seeing each recitation of Amida’s name as spontaneously evoking a sense of repentance, leading naturally to the purification of past karmic transgressions.

The Great Buddha of Kamakura, cast in the 13th century, at the Jōdo-shū temple of Kōtoku-in.

Ryōchū also met with Renjaku-bo, whose own teacher Genchi, had been another disciple of Hōnen. Renjaku-bo felt that Genchi and Benchō had been in complete agreement, so he willingly united his lineage with Ryōchū's, helping to further increase its standing. Jōdo Shū through the Chinzei lineage continued to develop until the 8th Patriarch, Shōgei (聖冏, 1341-1420) who formalized the training of priests (previously Jodo priests had to train under Tendai or Shingon lineages), thus formally establishing it as an independent sect. Before this, the Jōdo-shū were not formally independent, instead being more of a faction (ha) within the Tendai school.

Meanwhile, Kenni (1238–1304), a disciple of Ryūshin, was instrumental in systematizing doctrine of Shōku’s Seizan school, especially the Fukakusa doctrine. Regarding Ryōchū as a rival, his work criticizes his views without naming him. Kenni composed the Kaijōki, a thirty six fascicle commentary to the Contemplation Sutra. Along with Ryōchū’s (1199–1287) Dentsūki, it is one of the most significant commentaries to this sutra written in the Kamakura period. Kenni's thought integrates Pure Land thought with the philosophy of the Chinese Tiantai school and his commentary quotes numerous Song dynasty Tiantai scholars extensively. Kenni also argued that Pure Land Buddhism was the "True School of the One Vehicle" (一乗真宗, Ichijō Shinshū), identifying the one vehicle teaching with the power of the Buddha. Kenni argued that the teaching of other-power was taught in all major sutras and that all Buddhist practices ultimately relied upon it. Kenni thus stresses that other-power is not confined to Pure Land teachings but is a foundational element across all of Buddhism.

It was also during this period that Ippen (1239–1289), initially a Seizan school monk, was active and established his Ji-shū sect.

=== Edo Period ===
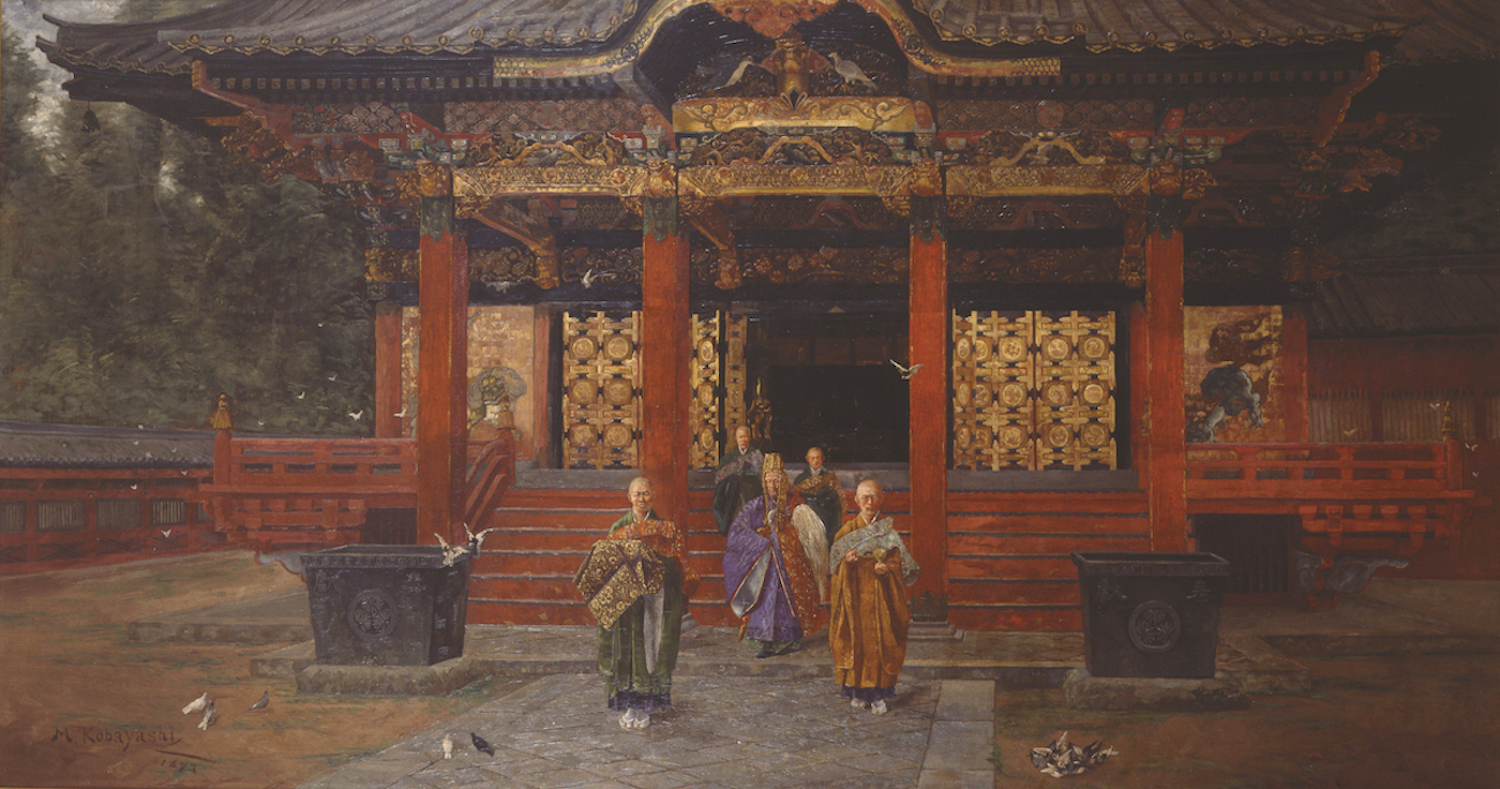
Shiba Zōjō-ji by Kobayashi Mango (Aichi Prefectural Museum of Art)

In 1590, during the Azuchi–Momoyama period, Jōdo-shū was officially patronized by Tokugawa Ieyasu, leading to an era of great prosperity for the sect that lasted throughout the Edo period and beyond. Due to this new found influence, Jōdo-shū would become the largest Buddhist sect, both in terms of population and influence, throughout the entire Edo period.

At this time, many new temples were founded and the sect spread widely throughout Japan with the aid of the Tokugawa Shoguns. With official support, the major temple of Zōjō-ji was founded in Edo as the family temple of the Tokugawa clan. Previously a Shingon temple, Zōjō-ji was converted to a Jōdo-shū temple, receiving considerable patronage. Several shoguns of the Tokugawa family are still interred in mausoleums at Zōjō-ji, though Ieyasu himself is interred at the Nikkō Tōshō-gū shrine.

In a coordinated effort with the Tokugawa Shogunate, the Jōdo sect was also influential in the conversion and suppression of Christians in Kyushu through monks such as Banzui'i. In the mid-Edo Period, the Jōdo monk Ensetsu introduced the practice of using a mokugyo while chanting nembutsu.

=== Meiji Period ===
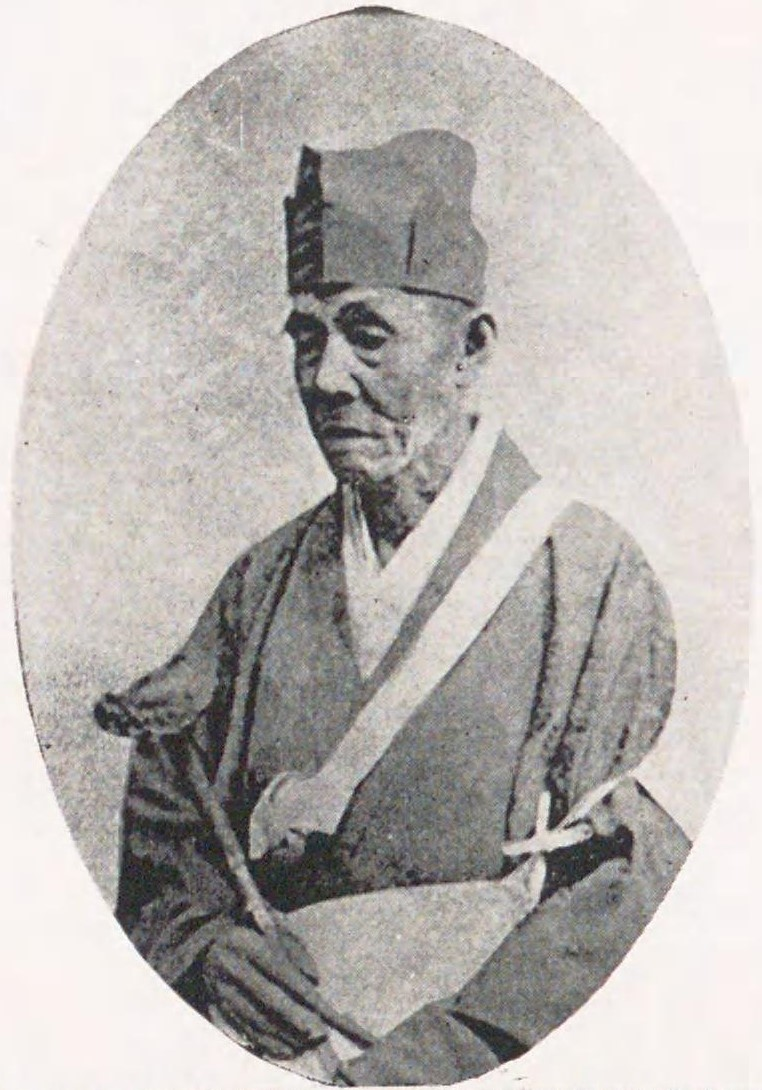
Fukuda Gyōkai, an important Jōdo sect reformer during the Meiji Period

The Meiji Restoration of 1868 marked a tumultuous period for Japanese Buddhism. The separation of Shinto and Buddhism unintentionally triggered the haibutsu kishaku (literally "abolish Buddhism and destroy Shākyamuni" campaign), a nationwide movement targeting Buddhist institutions, in which temples were demolished, their properties revoked, and their monks forcibly defrocked.

Jōdo-shū, having formerly received considerable patronage from the Tokugawa Shogunate, now embarked on a period of internal reform in which several monks emerged as important reformers, such as Yamazaki Ben'nei, Tetsujō Ukai, and Fukuda Gyōkai.

=== Shōwa Period ===
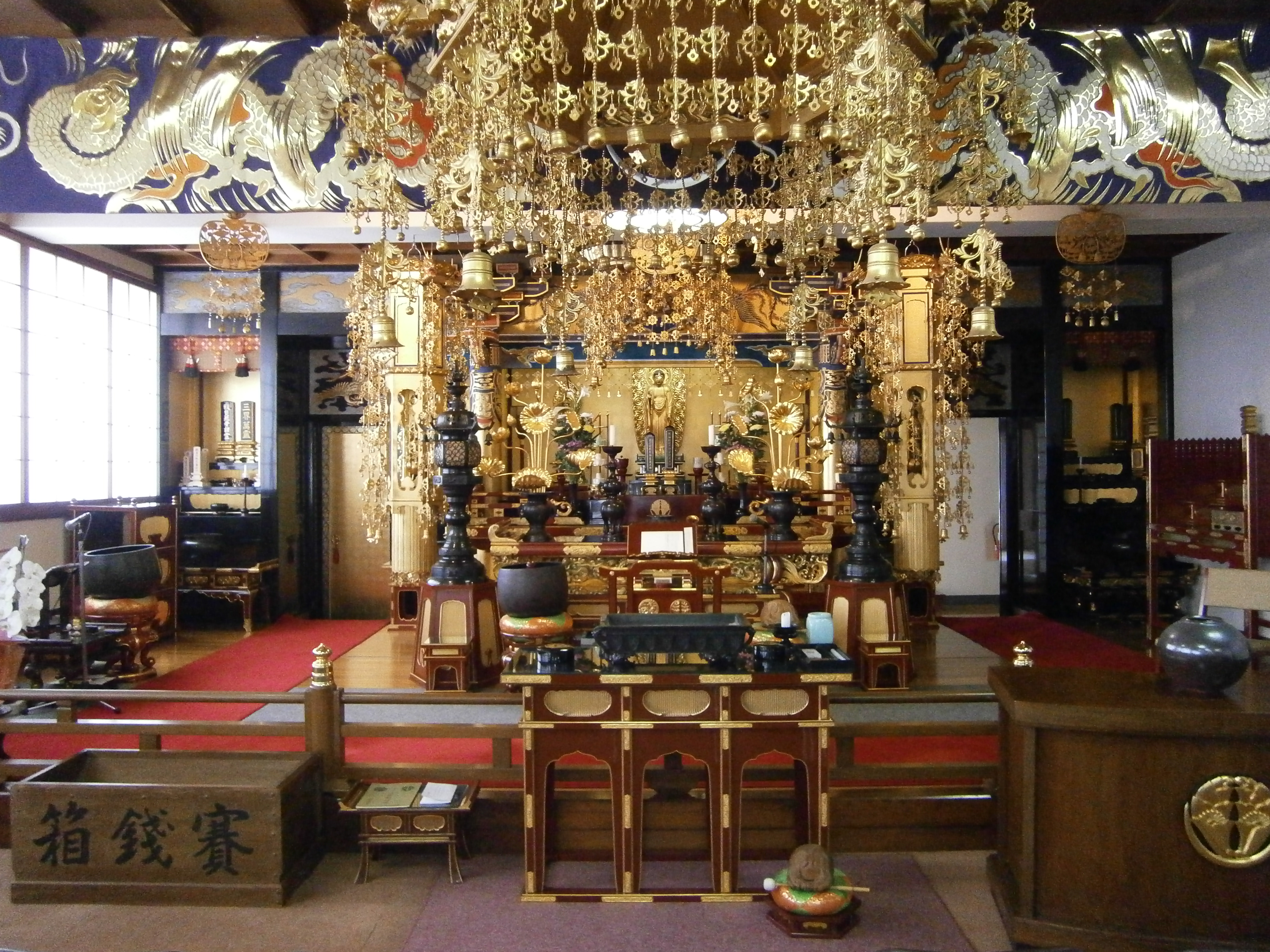
En'ō-ji Main Hall

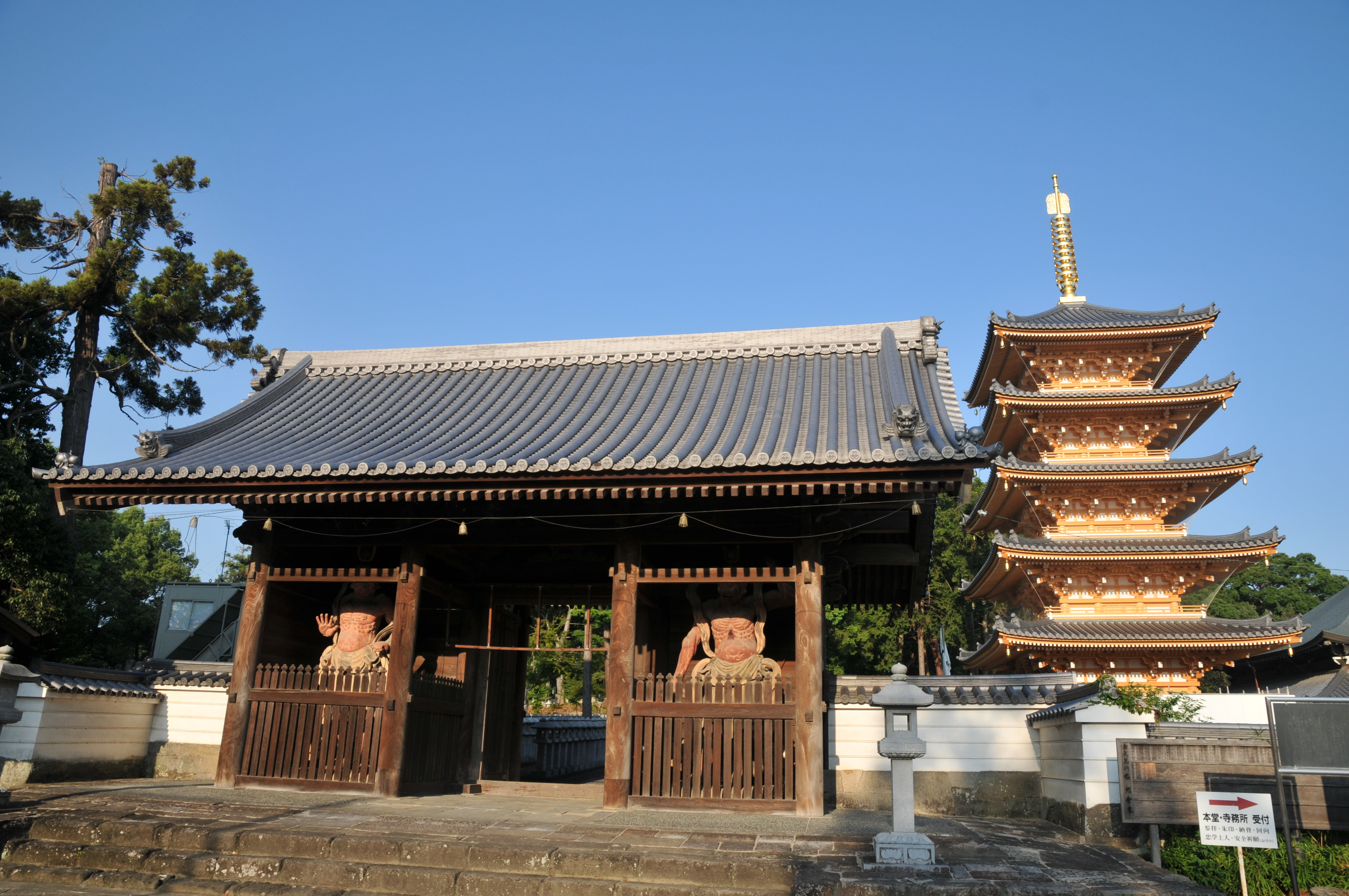
Busshozan Honenji

Before and during World War II, Jōdo-shū, along with other Buddhist sects, faced pressure to endorse the actions of Imperial Japan and its policy of State Shintō. Despite the protests of certain members of the sect, the Jōdo-shū organization nevertheless complied with the policy of State Shintō. This included building several temples within Japan’s overseas colonies (all of which would later be destroyed in the years following the war) and providing memorial services to deceased soldiers as well as relief for their families. The school subsequently apologized for its wartime actions alongside the other Buddhist sects of Japan.

After World War II, several temples broke off from the main Chinzei Branch of Jōdo-shū, forming their own independent sects. However, these breakaway branches proved to be relatively short-lived, as, in January 1961, on the 750th anniversary of Hōnen’s death, the majority of the breakaway sects of Jōdo-shū merged back into the primary Chinzei branch, which remains the largest branch of Jōdo-shū.

== Outside Japan ==
Although Jōdo-shū is mainly found in Japan, a sizable Jōdo-shū community exists in Hawaii as well as a few temples in the continental United States and Brazil. The first Jōdo-shū temple built in Hawai'i was the Hāmākua Bukkyo Kaido, constructed in 1896 under the supervision of Reverend Gakuo Okabe.

The head temple of the Jōdo sect in Hawaii is the Jodo Mission of Hawaii in Honolulu, founded in 1907 and moved to its current location in 1932. The Jodo Shu North America Buddhist Missions was the first Jōdo-shū temple to be built in mainland America in 1936 in Los Angeles, California.

== Doctrine ==
The doctrine of the Jōdo-shū sects closely follows that of its founder Hōnen, who is considered the central authority in the tradition. It also relies on the works of the earlier Jōdo patriarchs, especially Shandao as well as the works of later disciples of Hōnen who founded their own lineages after Hōnen's death. The most important figures in this later period were Benchō, founder of the Chinzei-ha, and Shōkū, founder of the Seizan branch.

=== Hōnen ===
Pure Land Buddhist teachings had been prevalent in Japan for centuries, particularly in the Tendai sect through Ennin, Genshin, and others, but what distinguished Hōnen's teaching was the notion senju nembutsu (専修念仏, exclusive nembutsu"), whereby the only true means of achieving rebirth in the Pure Land was through reciting the nembutsu. In particular, Hōnen argued that it was through Amida Buddha's merit and vow power that one achieved rebirth. Since the nembutsu was explicitly called out in the Immeasurable Life Sutra in the 18th Vow (also known as the Primal Vow), nembutsu was the only practice that would work, especially in the latter age of Age of Dharma decline (mappō), when people could no longer effectively put the teachings of the Buddha into practice anymore. Other practices would neither add nor detract from Amida Buddha's power.

Basing himself on the writings of past masters like Saichō, on the Immeasurable Life Sutra and other sutras which speak of the Age of Dharma decline, Hōnen felt that society had already reached the era of latter days of the Dharma and thus all practices other than nembutsu had ceased to have any efficacy. This message resonated with the common people living near the end of the Heian period, when traditional Japanese Buddhism had become deeply involved in political schemes, flaunting its wealth and power.

Further, Hōnen sought to provide people a simple Buddhist practice that anybody could use toward enlightenment, no matter how degenerate the times because he was concerned that many people were excluded from existing sects. Thus, Hōnen writes that:

"The reason I founded the Jōdo [浄土, Pure Land] sect was that I might show the ordinary man how to be born into the Buddha’s real land of recompense [e.g. the Pure Land]. According to the Tendai sect, the ordinary man may be born into the so-called Pure Land, but that land is conceived of as a very inferior place. Although the Hossō [Yogacara] sect conceives of it as indeed a very fine superior place, they do not allow that the common man can be born there at all. And all the sects, though differing in many points, all agree in not allowing that the common man can be born into the Buddha’s land of real compensation....Unless I start a separate sect, the truth that the common man may be born into the Buddha’s land of compensation will be obscured, and it will be hard to realize the deep meaning Amida [Buddha]’s Original Vow [to provide a refuge for all beings]."

— Rev. Harper Coates and Rev. Ryugaku Ishizuka, translation

Since, according to Hōnen's line of reasoning, one's birth in the Pure Land was mostly due to Amida Buddha's power, there was no reason why anyone who sincerely recited the nembutsu could not be reborn in the Pure Land.

Hōnen's new tradition relied closely on the works of Shandao, in particular his Commentary on the Contemplation Sutra, where he writes:

Not for the purpose of surpassing others... Single-mindedly and exclusively reciting the name of Amida, without questioning the length of time during walking, standing, sitting, or lying down, and without abandoning it thought-moment after thought-moment, this is called the Act of Right Assurance, because it accords with the Buddha's vow.

Hōnen did not designate a specific successor while he was alive, stating, "When practicing the nembutsu, all are my successors." Because his teachings were expressed with flexible breadth in both entry-level and profound aspects, differing opinions soon arose among his disciples, and these disputes continued after his death, leading to the arising of various doctrinal positions among the Jōdo-shū sub-sects.

=== Chinzei-ha doctrine ===
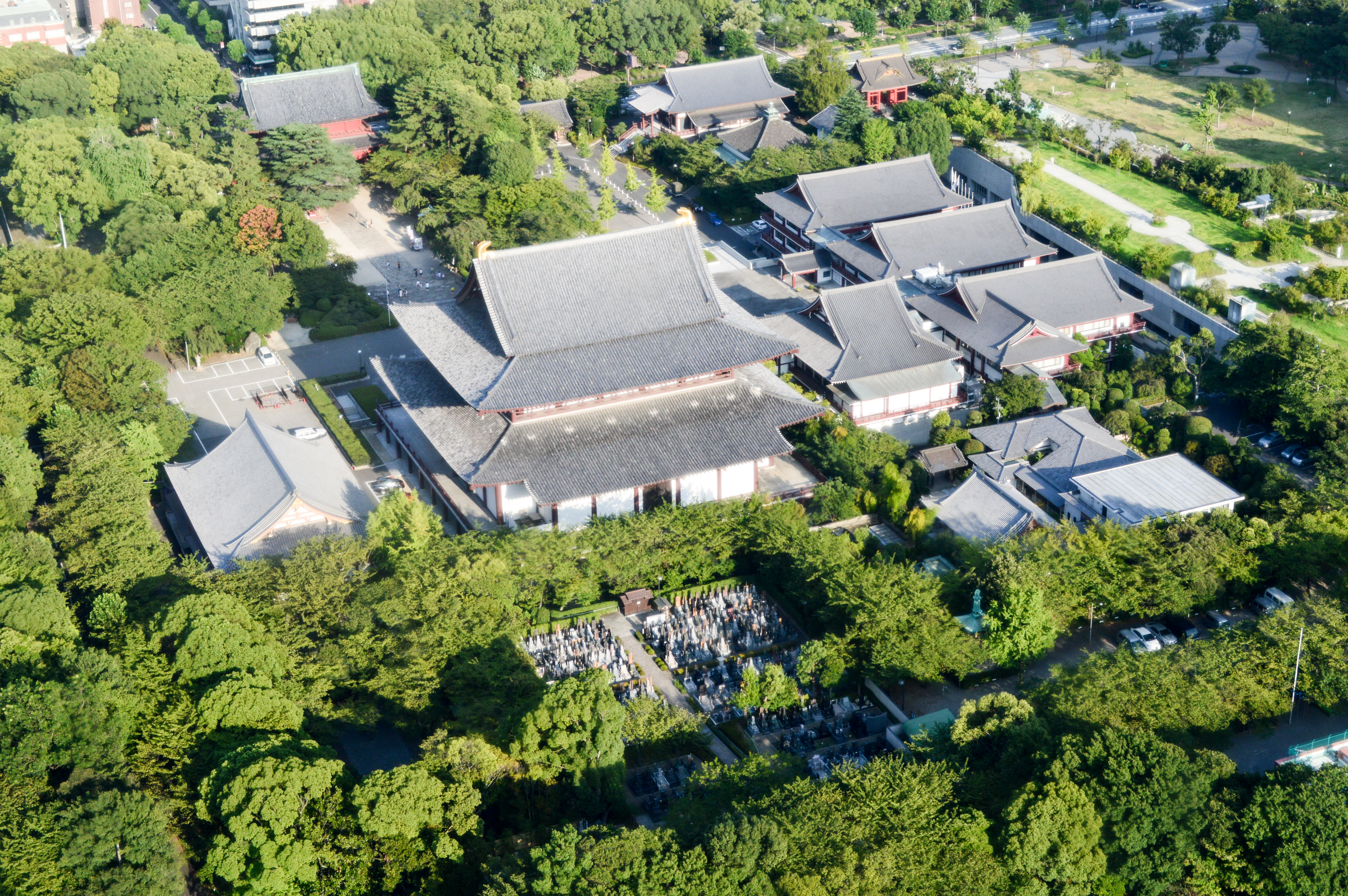
Chinzei head temple, Zōjō-ji

The doctrine of Jōdo-shū's largest branch, the Chinzei-ha closely follows Benchō's teachings. Benchō advanced a doctrinal program that aligned with the conservative group that emphasized cumulative nembutsu practice (called tanengi, "many callings") and rejected the claim that a single recitation was sufficient (ichinengi). This faction upheld continuous recitation as the means of cultivating faith throughout one’s life and affirmed the supporting role of traditional Buddhist disciplines, understood within a framework of other-power. A principal feature of Benchō’s thought is his sustained defense of the tanengi position, the insistence on repeated recitation of the nembutsu. He vigorously critiqued those who upheld the ichinengi view associated with teachers such as Kōsai, arguing that advocates of “once-calling” distorted Hōnen’s intent.

Benchō's understanding of the nembutsu was broad and inclusive. While affirming vocal invocation as the central practice, he accepted the legitimacy of auxiliary disciplines as provisional supports for attaining birth in the Pure Land. He devoted particular attention to practices that earlier Pure Land teachers, including Hōnen, had minimized, such as the “Three Modes of Practice” drawn from Genshin’s Ōjōyōshū. These included extended observances at fixed times, detailed instructions for deathbed rites, contemplative forms of nembutsu, and the aspiration to have a vision of the Buddha. Unlike disciples who rejected meditative practices as potentially pride-inducing exercises of self-effort, Benchō upheld the value of samādhi and taught that concentrated nembutsu leading to visions of Amida represented a superior mode of practice, even while acknowledging that birth could also be attained with an unfocused mind.

This inclusive stance extended to Benchō’s broader doctrinal synthesis. He proposed a schema in which all Buddhist practices were classified into two main categories: a comprehensive, all-embracing nembutsu, and the particular practice of name-recitation, ultimately subsumed by the latter. He also held that the various modes of nembutsu were, when taken individually, equal in value. Drawing on sources such as the Daśabhūmikavibhāṣā, he argued that where the Buddha’s compassionate power is operative, practices often labeled “self-powered” can still function within the Pure Land path. He even allowed that reciting the names of other Buddhas and bodhisattvas could be considered part of the Pure Land’s “easy practice,” further underscoring the range of methods he regarded as compatible with Amida-centered devotion.

Benchō’s emphasis on disciplined practice reached its culmination in his teachings on deathbed rites. He insisted that the final moments of life were crucial and defended traditional procedures intended to secure right mindfulness at death, opposing those who de-emphasized these rituals. In Benchō’s view, proper preparations included arranging images, scriptures, ritual implements, and continuous chanting until the final breath, ideally under the guidance of a qualified teacher. He warned that to die without such support was analogous to attempting a dangerous journey without proper equipment. Benchō also distinguished between “good” and “bad” deaths, maintaining that peaceful passing accompanied by recitation or auspicious signs indicated Pure Land attainment, whereas deaths marked by pain, confusion, or distress foretold unfortunate rebirths.

=== Seizan doctrine ===
The teachings of the Seizan school follow the works of Shōkū and its influence is seen in works like the Anjin Ketsujō Shō. Unlike Benchō who emphasized strict practice, Shōkū emphasized settled faith (anjin) and the non-duality of the Buddha with all sentient beings. He held that the recitation of the nembutsu arises from a state of anjin, or settled trust, in which one relinquishes any confidence in one’s own spiritual capacity and instead relies fully on Amida Buddha’s primal vow. Drawing on Shandao’s doctrine of the three devotional minds, he described genuine settled faith as a movement of wholehearted sincerity, deep confidence in Amida’s timeless vow, and an earnest aspiration for rebirth in the Pure Land. Because Amida’s enlightenment guarantees the liberation of beings, Shōkū treated the absence of doubt regarding this vow as identical with faith itself.

This conception of faith informed his interpretation of the nembutsu. For Shōkū, the formula Namu Amida Butsu expresses both the devotee’s entrusting attitude and Amida’s salvific activity. As such, its recitation reveals the ultimate non-duality of practitioner and Buddha. He characterized this unity of Buddha and sentient being as the unity of Buddha and person, kihō ittai. For Shōkū, the nembutsu devotee becomes inseparably linked with Amida’s Dharma-body at the moment that true trust is established. Because of this relationship, faith effects immediate participation in the Pure Land and turns all subsequent actions into manifestations of Amida’s power.

Within this framework, Shōkū developed the doctrine of the “unvarnished nembutsu,” insisting that nembutsu recitation should remain free of all self-powered embellishments. Although he did not dismiss other forms of Buddhist practice, he denied that they contribute to rebirth in the Pure Land, seeing them as merely expressions of Amida’s working. The nembutsu itself requires no doctrinal elaboration, moral purification, or meditative achievement. Shōkū also stressed that even those lacking virtue and knowledge can attain liberation simply by invoking Amida’s name, provided the invocation is grounded in reliance on other-power rather than one’s own efforts.

Shōkū also articulated a distinctive approach to the broader range of Buddhist practices. He argued that all virtuous activities, including the five Pure Land observances described by Shandao and the threefold training, can function as other-power practices if undertaken with an attitude of reliance upon Amida. For Shōkū, the decisive distinction between self-power and other-power lies not in the type of practice itself but in the practitioner’s relation to Amida’s vow. When one recognizes one’s limitations and entrusts everything to the Buddha, even ordinary desires can be redirected toward Pure Land aspiration.

== Practice ==
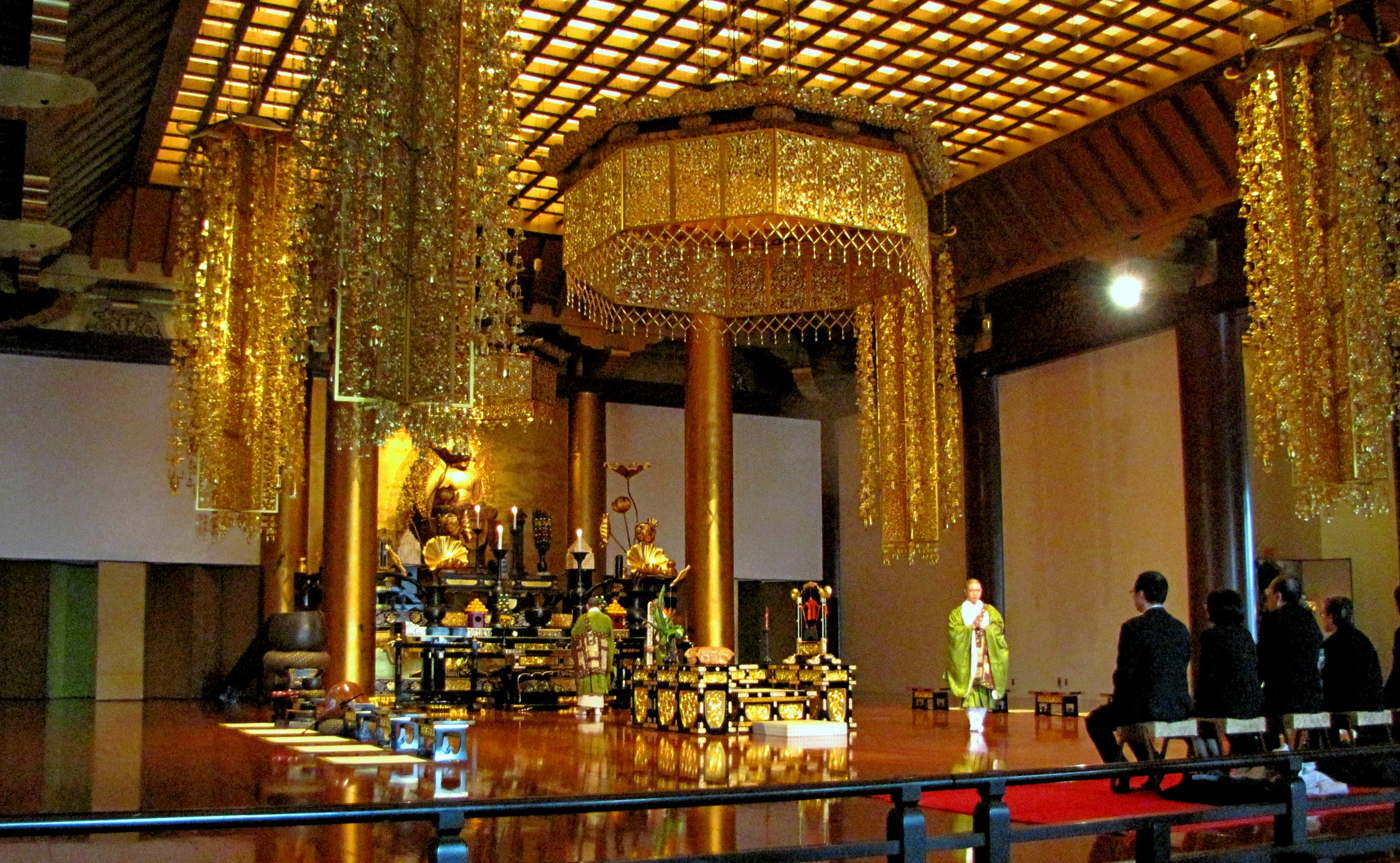
Interior of the Daiden, Zōjō-ji

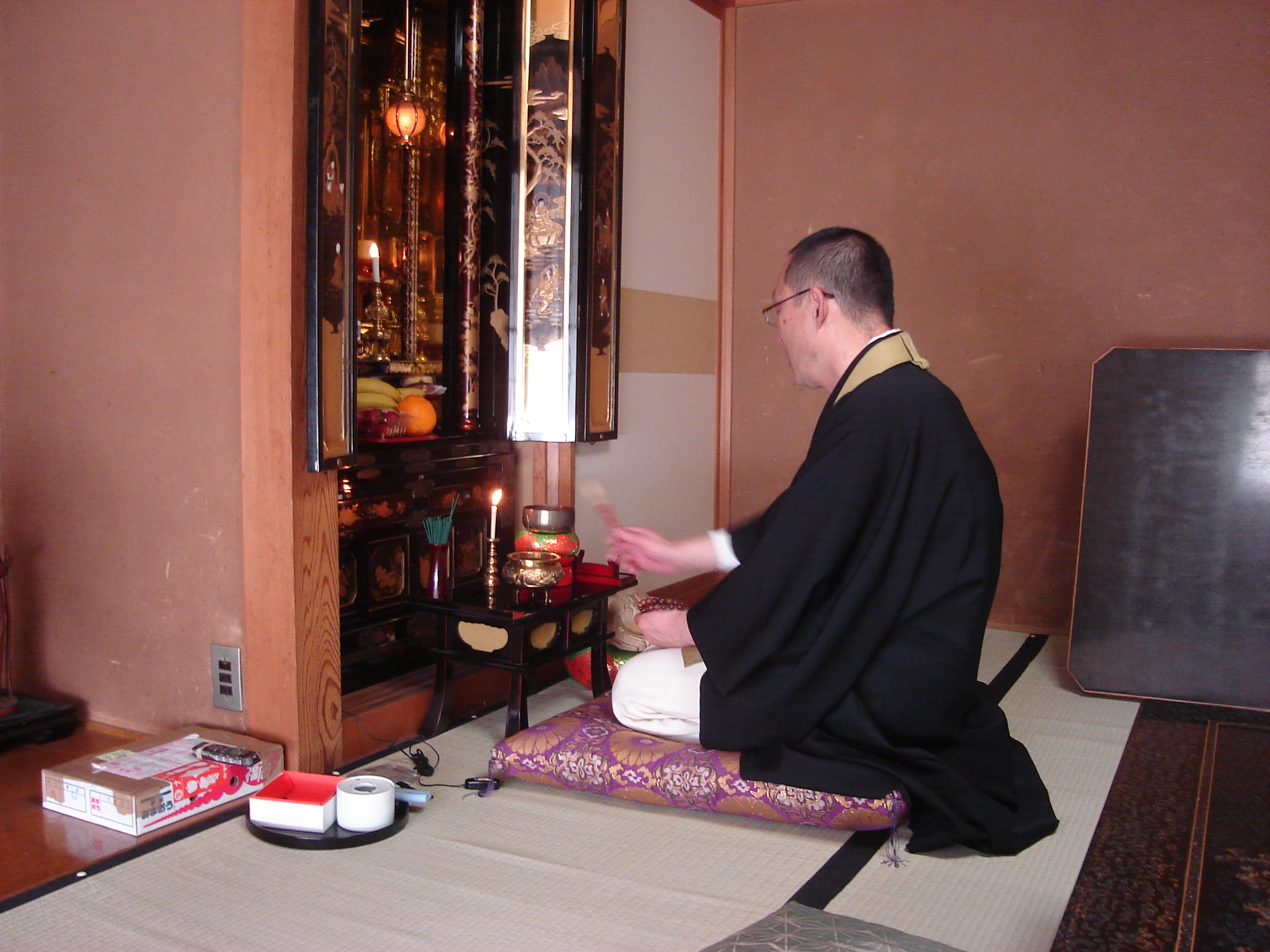
A priest of Jodo-shu in rural Fukui prefecture visits the home of a parishioner to chant a sutra for a deceased family member in front of a butsudan.

The recitation of the nembutsu using the phrase: Namu Amida Butsu (南無阿弥陀仏; "Praise to the Buddha Amitabha"), is the most fundamental practice of Jōdo-shū. It is considered to be derived from the Primal Vow of Amitābha. Since it is traditionally believed to be an easy practice that taps into Amida Buddha's other-power, it is held to be the best Buddhist practice for our era of Dharma decline. Through this practice, all beings can attain birth in the Pure Land of Sukhavati, where becoming a Buddha is much easier. In Jōdo-shū home practice, or in temple liturgy, the nembutsu may be recited in any number of styles including:

- Jūnen (十念; "Ten Recitations") – reciting the nembutsu ten times, with eight recitations of "Namu Amida Bu," followed by one "Namu Amida Butsu," and one final drawn out "Namu Amida Bu," accompanied by a bow.
- Nembutsu Ichie (念仏一会; "Nembutsu Gathering") – reciting the nembutsu as many times as possible in a sitting, regardless of number.
- Nembutsu Sanshōrai (念仏三唱礼; "Three Intonations of Praise") – style involving three drawn-out recitations of the nembutsu, followed by a bow. This is repeated twice more for a total of nine recitations.

In addition to practicing the nembutsu, Jōdo-shū practitioners are encouraged to engage in "auxiliary" practices, such as observing the five precepts, Buddha contemplation meditation, the chanting of the Pure Land sutras, and other forms of good conduct. There is no strict rule on this however, as Jōdo-shū stresses that the compassion of Amitābha is extended to all beings who recite the nembutsu, so how one observes auxiliary practices depends on the individual. Furthermore, Jōdo-shū practitioners are allowed to worship kami and visit Shinto shrines as long as they do not worship the kami as a means to enter the Pure Land.

Jōdo-shū also hosts a circuit pilgrimage of 25 Sacred Sites that Hōnen visited throughout his life, as well as temples that are important to the sect.

=== Scripture ===
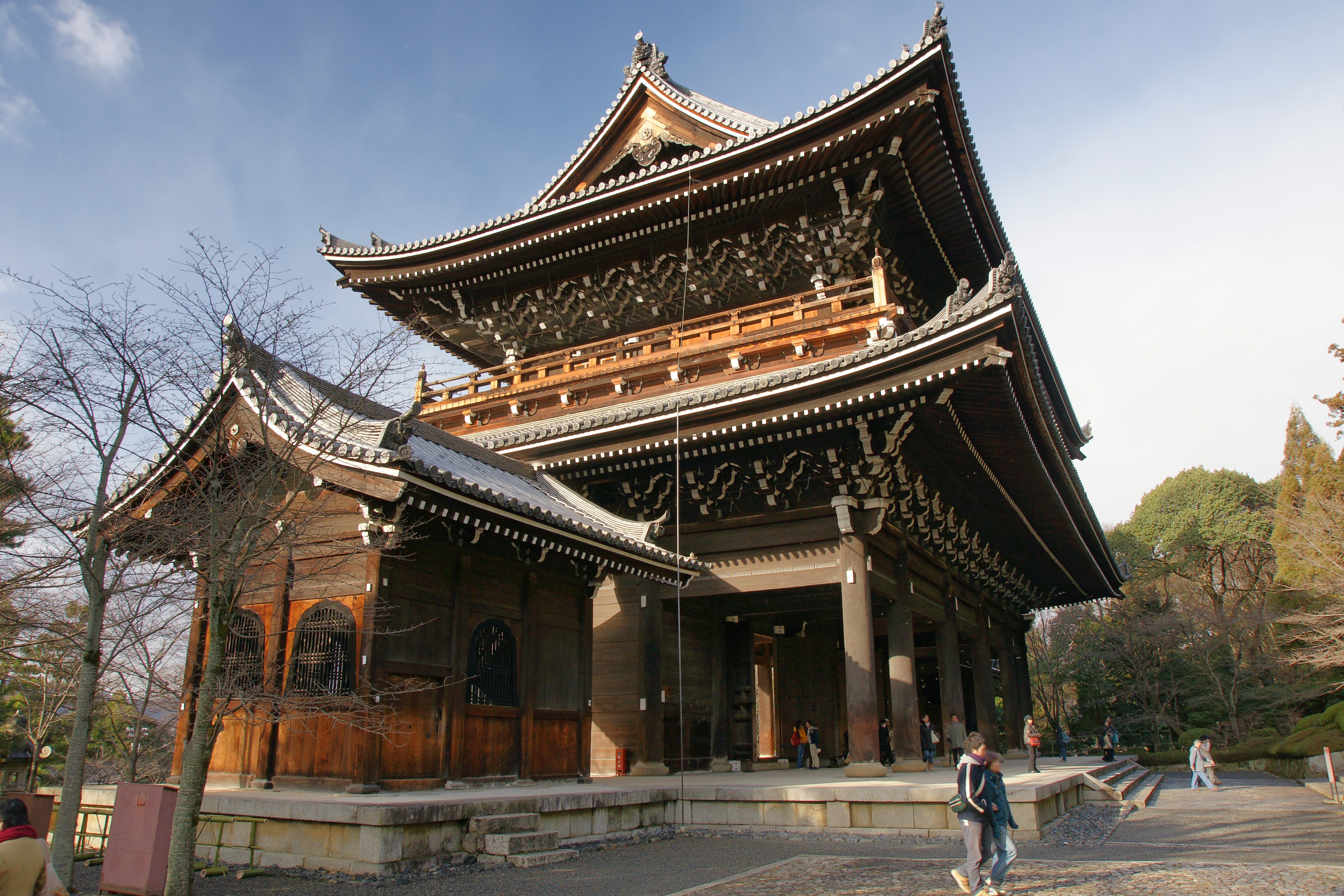
Chion-in, the highest temple of Jōdo-shū

Of the entire Buddhist canon, Sutra of Immeasurable Life is the central Buddhist scripture for Jōdo-shū, and the foundation of the belief in the Primal Vow of Amida Buddha. In addition to this, the Amitāyurdhyāna Sūtra and the Amitābha Sūtra are important to the Jōdo-shū school. Collectively, these are known as the Sanbukyō (三部経, "Three Pure Land Sutras").

Further, the writings of Hōnen, are another source for Jōdo-shū thought. The most central of his works include the Senchaku Hongan Nembutsushū (often abbreviated to Senchakushū) and the Ichimai-Kishōmon (一枚起請文, "One-Sheet Document"). Most of what is known about Honen and his thought is attributed through sayings collected in the following century, the Senchakushū, and letters to his students and disciples. The One-Sheet Document is also read aloud in daily services as part of Jōdo-shū liturgy.

== Temples and Clergy ==
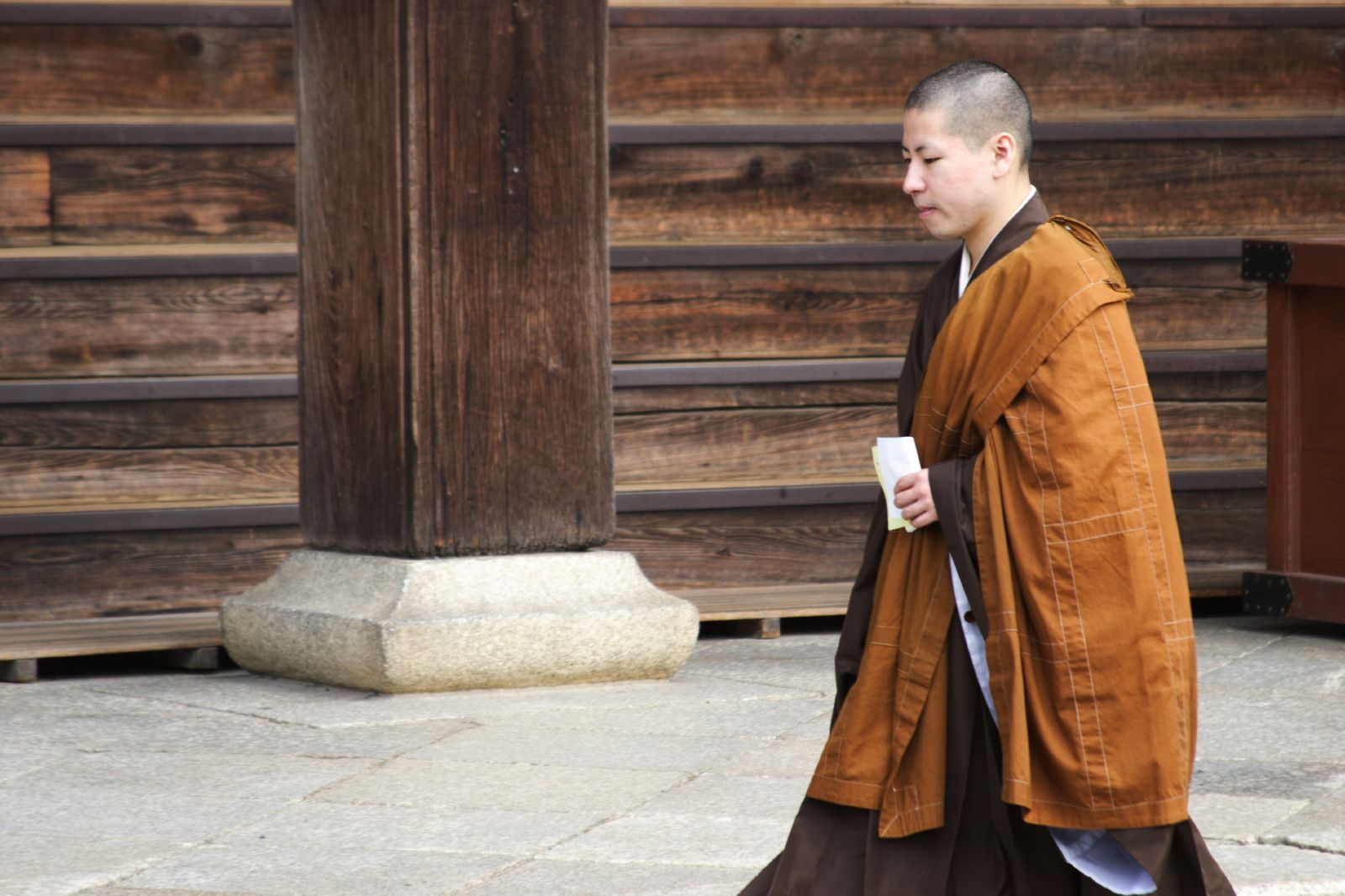
Jōdo monk at Chion-in, Kyoto

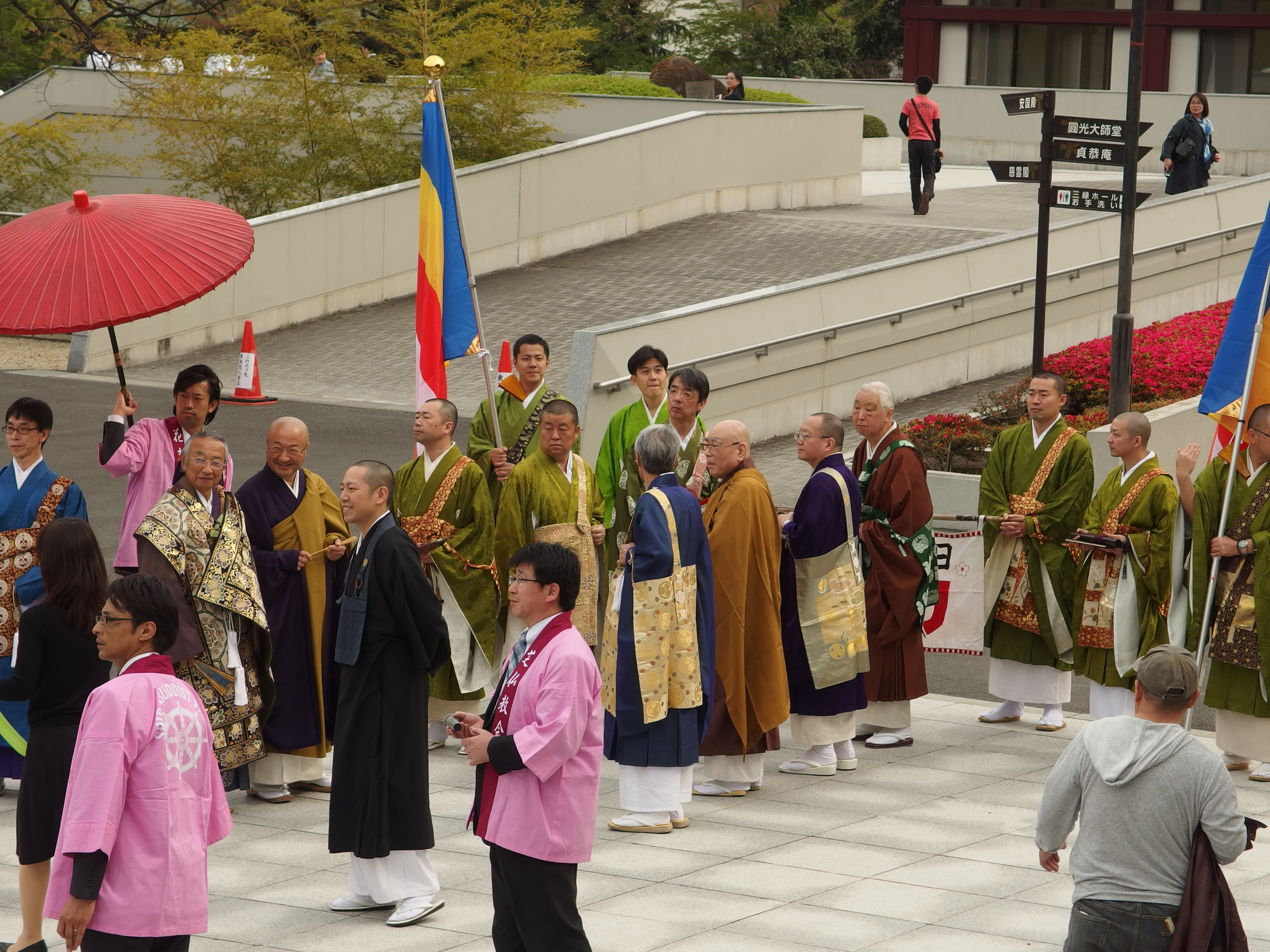
Jōdo monks celebrating Buddha's Birthday (hanamatsuri) at Zōjō-ji

Jōdo-shū, like other Buddhist schools, maintains a professional, monastic priesthood. Jōdo monks are ordained in the bodhisattva precepts as passed down by the Tendai founder Saichō and transmitted through Hōnen. Monks are often educated at the tradition's official universities and seminaries, which include Bukkyo University (佛教大学, Bukkyō daigaku).

The heads of the Jōdo-shū school are called monshu in Japanese, and the Chinzei sect's monshu lives at the head temple of Chion-in.

The Chinzei branch has two "head temples", one at Chion-in in Kyoto, and one at Zojoji in Tokyo.

For the Seizan branch, there are three sub-branches, each with their own head temples, including Eikan-dō Zenrin-ji.

== Literature ==
- Blum, Mark L. The Origins and Development of Pure Land Buddhism: a Study and Translation of Gyōnen's Jōdo Hōmon Genrushō. Oxford, New York, Oxford University Press, 2002.
- Matsunaga, Daigan, and Alicia Matsunaga. Foundation of Japanese buddhism, Vol. 2: The Mass Movement (Kamakura and Muromachi Periods). Los Angeles, Tokyo, Buddhist Books International, 1990.
- The Three Pure Land Sutras. Rev. 2nd ed. Translated by Hisao Inagaki with Harold Stewart, Numata Center for Buddhist Translation and Research, 2003. PDF
