= Kōsai =

Kōsai (幸西; 1163 – May 20, 1247) or Kōsai Jōgakubō, was a former monk of the Tendai Buddhist sect and disciple of Hōnen's Pure Land Buddhist lineage. Kōsai, along with another monk called Gyōkū, were famous as advocates of the ichinen-gi (一念義; "Single thought doctrine" or “the doctrine of a single nenbutsu”) which proved to be quite popular as well as controversial. Kōsai was eventually exiled to Shikoku during a period of persecution of Hōnen's lineage by the Japanese government.

Kōsai's teaching emphasizes a single faithful moment in which a single recitation of Amitābha's name (nembutsu), would cause a transformative religious experience that was itself sufficient to attain birth in the Pure Land. His teaching emphasizes true faith over practice. This doctrine of "single nembutsu" (ichinen) drew criticism from established Buddhist sects at the time, and even Hōnen's other disciples like Benchō. Kōsai's teaching may have also influenced Shinran (1173–1262), the founder of Jōdo Shinshū, who also emphasizes the primacy of true faith (shinjin) and whose teaching is similar to Kōsai's.

== Life ==
There is very little information on Kōsai's life. He was a Tendai monk at Mount Hiei who joined Hōnen’s inner circle at age 36. He was a popular preacher and had a number of disciples in Kyoto, Shikoku and in Echigo. Kōsai was clearly an important disciple of Hōnen, since he was part of the close circle of disciples whose name is found in various key documents. He was also given permission by Hōnen to copy his Senchakushū, which only circulated among a smell set of key disciples. Kōsai's interpretation of Hōnen's Pure Land teaching emphasized a single moment of transformative faith and taught that a single nembutsu could be enough for attaining birth in the Pure Land.

During the Karoku Persecution of 1207, Kōsai was exiled from Kyoto. He continued to teach in Shikoku, and gathered other followers. Kōsai's teaching may have influenced Shinran (1173–1262), later recognized as the founder of Jōdo Shinshū (True Pure Land), who also emphasized absolute reliance on Amida’s other-power (tariki), rejecting personal effort as a means to salvation. For Shinran, reciting the nembutsu was not a practice to achieve birth in the Pure Land, but an expression of gratitude for already being saved by Amida.

Kōsai's lineage continued to be popular well into the fifteenth century. But at this time, political pressure from the Japanese government and from the mainstream Jōdo-shū schools led to his tradition's eventually disappearance. His ideas remained influential well into the modern era however.

Most of Kōsai’s works were lost, with only two writings surviving: Keishi Kashō Ruijū and a fragment of Gengibunshō (a sub-commentary on Shandao’s commentary to the Contemplation Sutra).

== Teaching ==
=== Ichinen ===
Kōsai's interpretation of Pure Land doctrine was shaped by his Tendai background, particularly the doctrine of innate enlightenment (hongaku). He viewed Amida Buddha as having two aspects: the “fundamental” Amida, representing primordial wisdom and identical to inherent buddha-nature (busshō), and the “incarnate” Amida, who attained enlightenment ten kalpas ago. Kōsai held that a single moment of true faith in Amida Buddha was sufficient for birth in the Pure Land and thus, even a single recitation of the nembutsu was enough to attain birth in the Pure Land. This is the doctrine that came to be called “single nen-[butsu]” or "single recitation" (ichi-nen). It is a doctrine which relies strongly on the other power of Amida Buddha and de-emphasizes our own personal efforts.

Blum notes that the term "a single moment of thought" (Ch. yinien, Jp. ichi-nen) is found in numerous sutras and other Buddhist treatises, and may represent a translation of eka-citta or citta-kṣana. The term “[wisdom] corresponding in a single thought-moment (nen),” used by Kōsai is found in the Aṣṭasāhasrikā Prajñāpāramitā. These terms were often used to express a moment of realization, as well as the arising of faith. Ichinen also appears in the Sukhāvatīvyūha in the passage: “anyone who, in hearing the name of the Buddha, feels their heart leap with joy in so much as one thought-moment (ichinen), obtains the great benefit.” Hōnen also cites this passage frequently and affirms that the attainment of birth occurs in a single moment. The term ichinen was also widely used in Tendai original enlightenment (hongaku) sources, including the Ichinen Jōbutsugi.

Kōsai's understanding of the nembutsu closely follows Hōnen's understanding of it as the primary and chosen teaching of the Buddha. However, while relying on Hōnen's understanding of the mental aspect of nenbutsu samādhi (a powerful religious experience), Kōsai pushes this teaching in innovative directions, claiming that the mental aspect of nembutsu is primary and the vocal act of recitation is a secondary element in Pure Land practice. Thus, according to Mark Blum, "What Kōsai, and probably Gyōkū, were trying to do is to focus on the psychological experience of the nenbutsu samādhi as a kind of "sudden shift in consciousness", not the means to achieve it." In the historian Gyōnen's discussion of Kōsai's doctrine, this is seen as "a kind of mystic meeting of the mind of the individual and the mind of the Buddha" which is sudden and momentary. According to Gyōnen:

When [Kōsai] spoke of a “single nen” (ichinen) he meant one thought-moment of Buddha wisdom, pointing precisely to the buddha-mind. It is this mind that is being referred to in [his use of] nenbutsu. The mind of faith (shinjin) of an ordinary being is in complete accord with the wisdom of the Buddha [in that moment]. It is this singular nen of Buddha wisdom that is the Original Vow of Amida Buddha.

Kōsai also understood this singular experience of nenbutsu samādhi as something which arose from the Buddha's other-power, not any effort on our part. Kōsai's view was widely criticized by many figures within and outside the Pure Land school. However, as Mark Blum notes, Kōsai's teaching is more complex than a simple affirmation of the possibility of being saved by a single nembutsu recitation. Indeed, while critics rejected the idea that we should only recite the nembutsu once, and never do it again, Kōsai's actual surviving works do not reject the value of nembutsu practice, even while emphasizing the attainment of a single moment of mind (ichinen) in which true faith dawns. Regarding this psychological view of ichinen, Blum writes:

In ichinengi, the single intoning of the nenbutsu does not imply that the nenbutsu is never to be uttered again, nor does this “one nenbutsu” indicate any “common” moment of ritual practice, but the particular experience of realization.

According to Blum, this experience of ichinen is based on faith, which he sees as "a religious experience that is sudden and utterly transformative for the individual." Kōsai's "single recitation" (ichinengi) doctrine thus held that one can attain birth in the Pure Land through one nembutsu as long as this act includes “the mind of faith (shinjin)" which "is in complete accord with the wisdom of the Buddha.” Along with Gyōkū, Kōsai emphasized faith over practice, though his view did not mean that he rejected practice after the establishment of true faith. Indeed, Blum argues that Kōsai affirmed Hōnen's position on oral recitation, even while emphasizing the mental aspect of nembutsu. For Kōsai, the most important element was the non-verbal, mental experience of nembutsu. While he saw the vocalization of the nembutsu as secondary to the mind's “psychological experience of nembutsu-samādhi”, he remained within Hōnen's orthodoxy regarding the practice of nembutsu. Thus, Mark Blum concludes that Kōsai's creative interpretation of Hōnen’s teaching is just as orthodox as that of other disciples who emphasized recitation. He further writes:

When Kōsai spoke of a single nenbutsu he was not saying that this is the only form of nenbutsu, but rather that this was the defining form of nenbutsu. What Kōsai valued most was a special moment of practice that perhaps should not even be called practice, since it indicates a moment of attainment rather than the “cultivation of causes” for awakening. It is a moment that is internal and therefore quiet, it is “sudden,” and it is characterized by the epiphany of feeling touched by the universal compassion of the Buddha’s wisdom, a moment that indicates the attainment of samādhi. Kōsai’s ichinen is therefore a nenbutsu of realization, just as Hōnen and Shinran also called the moment of attaining faith ichinen.

=== Interpretations and critiques ===
Whatever Hōnen thought of Kōsai's specific teaching is unknown. However, Hōnen did promote constant repetition of the nembutsu, and as such, he held that any view which rejected constant and extensive nembutsu practice was inconsistent with Shandao's teachings and ultimately erroneous. Regarding this issue, Hōnen criticized the misinterpretation of scriptural passages, emphasizing that the phrase “one’s whole life through” in Shandao’s writings was meant to encourage continued practice, not a single utterance. Hōnen also issued a formal prohibition of certain radical and antinomian interpretations of the ichinengi position, condemning its proponents as ignorant, immoral and self-serving. The influence of the idea that one should not practice many nembutsu recitations on Motochika, the Minister of War and a devoted follower of Hōnen led Hōnen to respond firmly, questioning whether those who promoted such teachings had attained enlightenment themselves. He condemned the notion that adherence to the Original Vow negated the importance of moral discipline, and argued that true faith necessitated lifelong devotion to the repetitive recitation of the nembutsu.

Hōnen also accepted the idea that one could attain birth in the Pure Land by even a single utterance of the nembutsu. Hōnen gave the following balanced advice on the nembutsu regarding the issue of "many nembutsus" vs "single nembutsu":

The ten invocations or one invocation refers to the way one believes in the nenbutsu. Therefore, in terms of faith you should take the position that a single nenbutsu (ichinen) brings about birth; and in terms of practice, I encourage you to vigorously engage in [nenbutsu] practice throughout your life.

And:

If, because it is taught that birth is attained with but one or ten utterances, you say the Nembutsu heedlessly, then faith is hindering practice. If, because it is taught that you should say the Name without abandoning it from moment to moment, you believe one or ten utterances to be indecisive, then practice is hindering faith. As your faith, accept that birth is attained with a single utterance; as your practice, endeavor in the Nembutsu throughout life.

Apart from this, it is not known how Hōnen responded to Kōsai's doctrine itself. Some sources from the Chinzei-ha sect of Jōdo-shū, claim that he was expelled from Hōnen's community by Hōnen. According to Blum, since this claim "can be found only in two biographies of Hōnen written by members of this Chinzei lineage" and "is not corroborated by any thirteenth-century source", it is likely that the idea that Kōsai was excommunicated by Hōnen is a later sectarian fabrication of the Chinzei sect.

Figures such as Benchō and Ryōchū, leaders of the Chinzei Pure Land lineage, denounced Kōsai's views as heretical and as a teaching which promotes immorality due to its lack of respect for ethical precepts. However, Mark Blum argues that these critiques as just as likely to be political than moral, and that "the animosity toward those holding the ichinengi position may be more about factional rivalry than moral turpitude."

== Bibliography ==
- Watts, Jonathan; Tomatsu, Yoshiharu, eds. (2005). Traversing the Pure Land Path: A Lifetime of Encounters with Honen Shonin. Jodo Shu Press. ISBN 4-88363-342-X.
