= Kenryaku =

Period of Japanese history (1211–1213 CE)

Kenryaku (建暦) was a Japanese era name (年号, nengō, lit. "year name") after Jōgen and before Kempo. This period spanned the years from March 1211 through December 1213. The reigning emperor was Juntoku-tennō (順徳天皇).

== Change of era ==
- 1211 Kenryaku gannen (建暦元年): The new era name was created because the previous era ended and a new one commenced in Jōgen 2, on the 9th day of the 3rd month of 1211.

== Events of the Kenryaku era ==
- 1211 (Kenryaku 1, 1st month): Shōgun Minamoto no Sanetomo's position at court was raised to the 1st rank of the 3rd class.

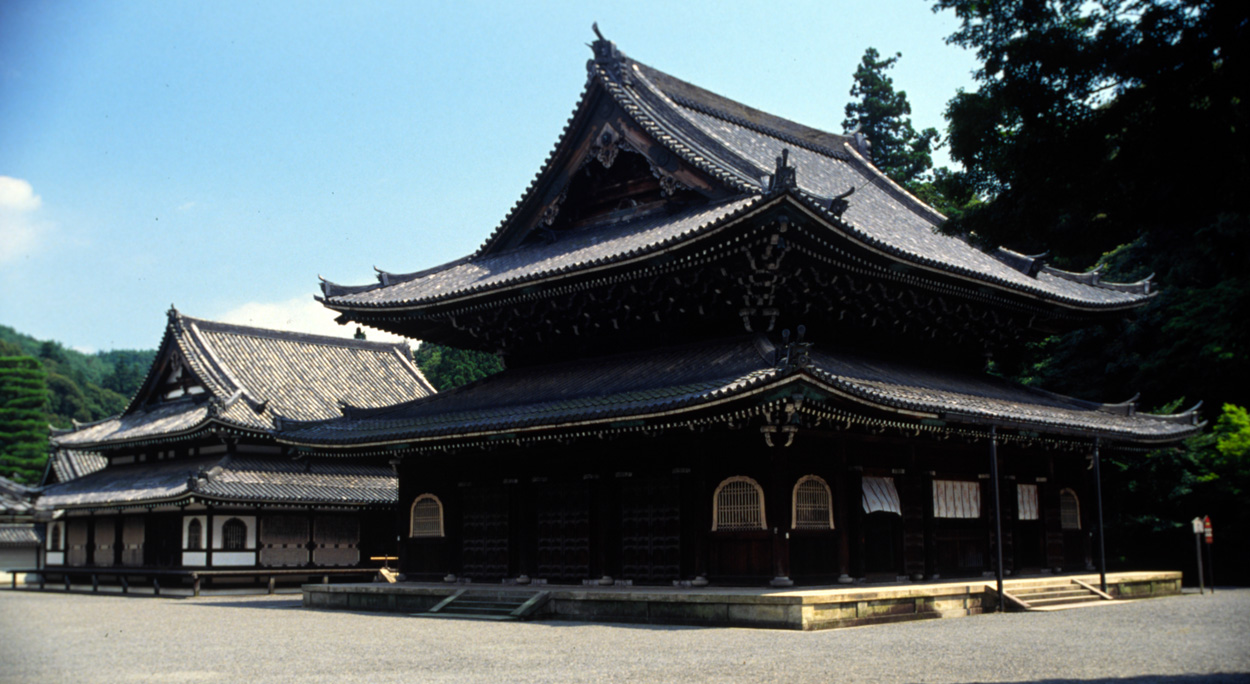
Sennyū-ji established in 1211

- 1211 (Kenryaku 1, 1st month): The Buddhist priest Hōnen returned to Kyoto from a period of exile. He was the founder and guiding force behind the early development of the Sennyū-ji (泉涌寺,, Sennyū-ji) temple-complex.
- January 12, 1212 (Kenryaku 2, 20th day of the 12th month): The Buddhist priest Hōnen died at age 80, mere days after drafting a brief, written summary of his life teachings. This last written document is known as the One-Sheet Document (ichimai-kishomon).
- 1212 (Kenryaku 2, 16th day of the 1st month): The former-Senior High Priest Jien (1155–1225) was appointed Tendai Abbot by Imperial Mandate. He would administer Mt. Hiei for one year before yielding the position on the 11th day of the 1st month of 1213.

== Notes ==
Preceded by Jōgen	Era or nengō Kenryaku; 1211–1213	Succeeded by Kempo
