= Chinzei =

Branch of Jōdo-shū Buddhism

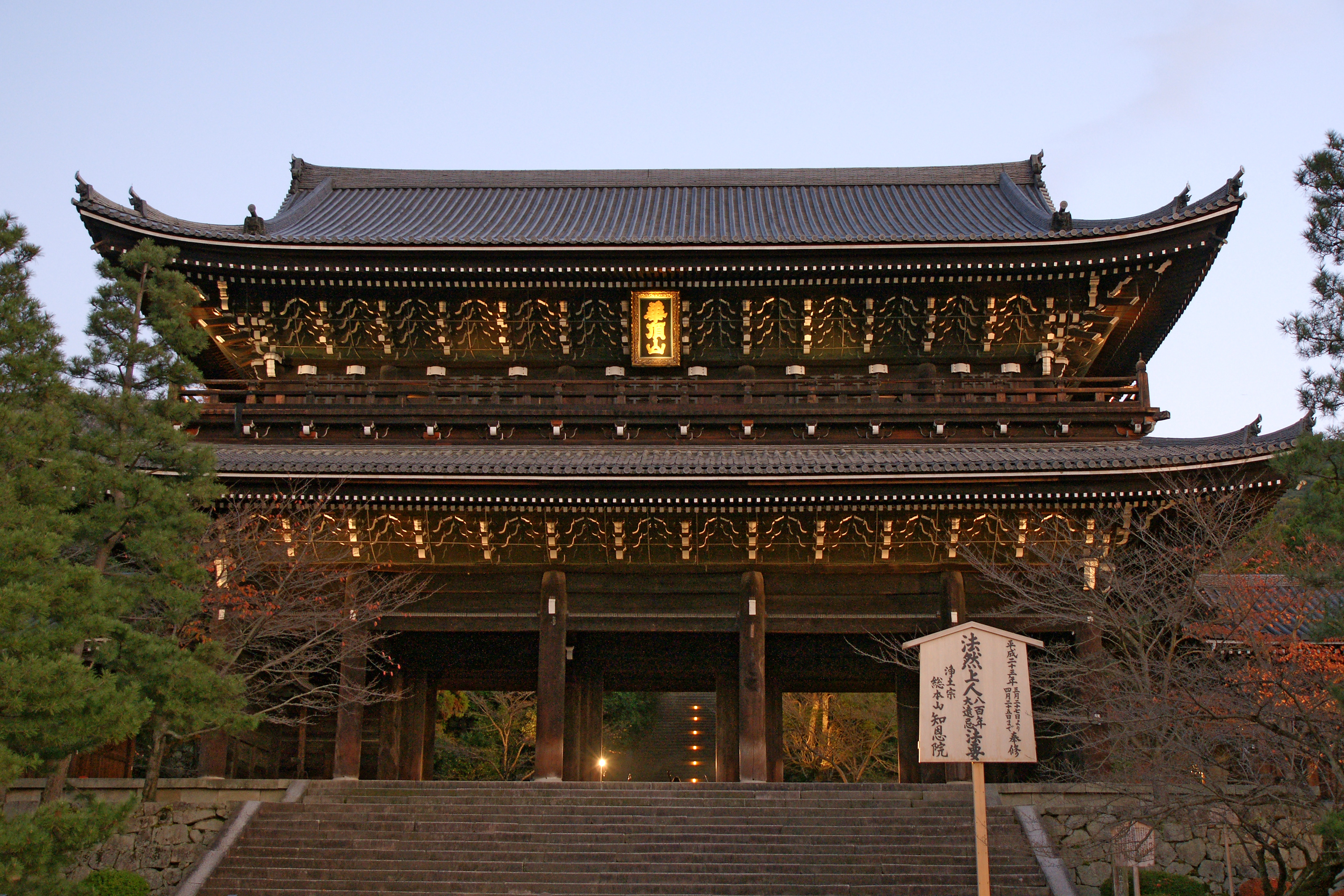
Sanmon of Chion-in temple. It is the largest Sanmon in Japan and is now a National Treasure of Japan

The Chinzei school (鎮西流) branch, also called the Chinzei Doctrine (鎮西義), is one of the two largest branches of Jōdo-shū Buddhism (the second being Seizan). The tradition traces itself to Benchō (a.k.a. Shōkō Shōnin), a disciple of Hōnen, but it was formally established as a separate branch by Benchō's disciple Ryōchū (良忠, 1199–1287). It is also sometimes called the Chikushi school due to its early development in the Chikushi region of Kyushu. It played a key role in shaping the doctrinal and institutional framework of Jōdo-shū, which remains one of Japan's major Buddhist traditions today.

Originally based in Kyushu where Benchō had been exiled, the sect contended with other disciples of Hōnen until it emerged into the dominant branch today. Its origins in Kyushu are also the reason for the sect's name, as Chinzei was an older name for Kyushu and was adopted by Benchō.

The famous temple of Chion-in, Hōnen's gravesite, and the temple of Zōjō-ji in Tokyo are all administered by the Chinzei branch.

== Overview ==
The Chinzei-ha (鎮西流) emerged during the Kamakura period as one of several lineages that developed within Hōnen’s Pure Land movement. It is mentioned in historical texts such as the Shijū Hyakuen'en-shū (1257), which classified Hōnen’s disciples into distinct doctrinal factions. Among these, the teachings of Shōkōbō Benchō (1162–1238) were recognized as the foundation of what became the Chinzei-ha.

The name "Chinzei" derives from Shōkō’s missionary activities in the Chikushi region (modern-day Fukuoka Prefecture), where he established Zendō-ji as a major center for Pure Land practice. His influence extended across Kyushu and beyond, leading to the formalization of the Chinzei-ha as an orthodox lineage of Jōdo-shū. Shōkō was originally a Tendai monk, became one of Hōnen’s closest disciples after encountering him in Kyoto. He was entrusted with a copy of Hōnen’s seminal work, Collection on the Selection of the Nembutsu (Senchakushū), and later propagated Pure Land teachings across western Japan.

Shōkō’s writings sought to clarify doctrinal disputes within the nascent Pure Land community and reinforce the authenticity of Hōnen’s teachings. His doctrinal approach became known as the Unifying One-Act Samadhi (Kekkai Ichigyō Zanmai), which integrated key elements of Pure Land belief into a coherent system centered on faith and practice. Shōkōbō was also known as a strong supporter of the tanengi doctrine ("many calling", which emphasized the need to recite nenbutsu as much as possible) and he criticized the supporters of ichinengi (once calling) teaching. He also advocated a balanced practice that included nembutsu and auxiliary Pure Land practices. Benchō categorized Buddhist practices as either a general form of nembutsu (sō no nembutsu) or the specific practice of reciting Amida’s name (betsu no nembutsu), arguing that the latter ultimately encompasses all other Buddhist practices. Drawing from the Daichidoron, he wrote extensively to systematize Hōnen’s teachings, notably in Matsudai Nembutsu Jushuin and Tetsu Senchakushū.

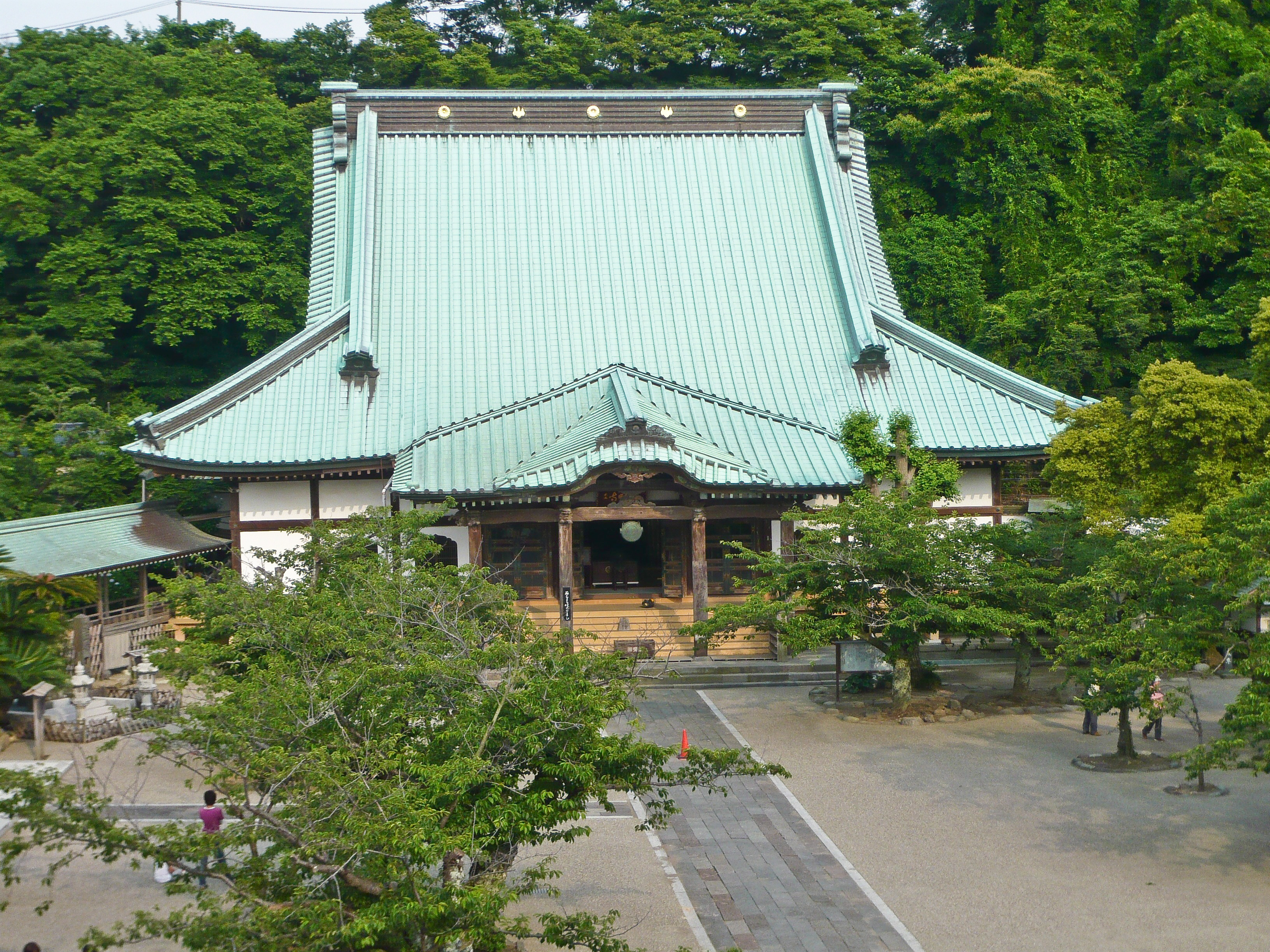
Main hall (hondo) of Kōmyō-ji, Kamakura.

A pivotal successor to Shōkō was Ryōchū (良忠, 1199–1287) also known as Nen’amidabutsu or Nen’a. He expanded the Chinzei-ha’s influence into eastern Japan, particularly in Kamakura and the Kantō region. Ryōchū’s missionary work helped establish the Chinzei-ha as one of the largest mainstream lineages of Jōdo-shū.

Ryōchū's efforts gained the patronage of Hōjō Tsunetoki, the fourth regent of the Kamakura shogunate, as well as other influential members of the Hōjō clan. In 1243, he established Goshin-ji temple in Kamakura, which was later renamed Renge-ji and eventually Kōmyō-ji. This temple became a key center for the propagation of Pure Land teachings, and Ryōchū continued to garner support from other shogunate officials, solidifying his role in the development of the Jōdo school. He was so influential that he became known as the third patriarch of the school.

Ryōchū also systematized the school’s teachings through texts like Jōdo-shū Yōshū and Ketsugi-shō, which further refined the role of the Five Gates of Mindfulness (五門念法) and the Three Minds (三心) in Pure Land practice, seeing them also as paths to the Pure Land. His teachings emphasized the power of the nembutsu to eliminate bad karma and how the greater a person's evil karma, the greater the amount of nembutsu practice was needed.

=== Development and Influence ===
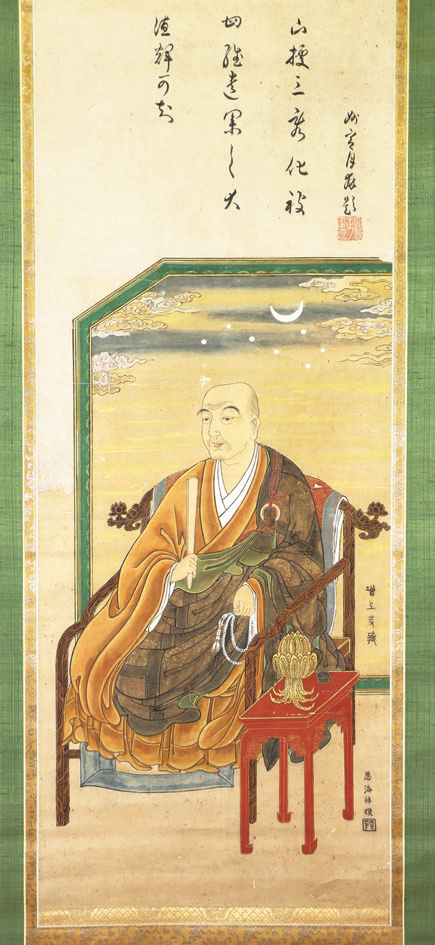
An image of Shogei Shonin owned by Zojo-ji.

After Ryōchū's passing, his disciples divided the Chinzei sect into six sub-branches, though they all preserved his teachings on practice. In the Muromachi period (1336–1573), the main Chinzei-ha sub-lineages were:

- Nagoe-ha (尊観派)
- Fujita-ha (性心派)
- Shirahata-ha (良暁派)
- Ichijō-ha (然空派)
- Sanjō-ha (道光派)
- Kobata-ha (慈心派)

These branches contributed to the spread of Jōdo-shū throughout Japan, particularly in Kyoto and Kanto.

One later figure who was pivotal in the development of the tradition was Shōgei (聖冏 1341-1420) of the Shirahata lineage. It was Shōgei who established a formal independent system for training Jōdo-shū priests (previously Jodo priests had to train under Tendai or Shingon lineages). Before this, Jōdo-shū were not formally independent from Tendai, since they relied on Tendai for their training and ordination. Shōgei also promoted the recitation of the nembutsu in front of Shinto kami shrines, seeing the kami as manifestations of Amida Buddha.

Shōgei is considered the eighth patriarch of Jōdo-shū Chinzei-ha and as a leader to made the school fully independent, establishing master-disciple lineage of priestly ordination which also included the bodhisattva precepts. This formal ordination was based on the Bodhisattva Precept Ceremony (Ju bosatsu kaigi 授菩薩戒儀 which the school had received from the Tendai tradition. This element sharply contrasts the Jōdo-shū with the Shinshū tradition who set aside all precepts and developed its own tradition of ordination.

Due to influence of Shōgei, the Shirahata-ha sub-sect of Chinzei-ha ultimately became the dominant force within the tradition.

A major event during this was the Chinzei sect's absorption of Chion'in temple, a major temple in Kyoto that had evolved out of Hōnen's gravesite. The heads of this temple had traditionally been closer to the Seizan sect. However, in 1450, Shōgei's disciple Keijiku (1403-59) was named head priest of Chion'in with the backing of emperor Gohanazono. Since that time, Chion'in was a Chinzei temple, giving the sect the prestige and aura of being the caretaker of the grave of Hōnen.

=== Edo Period to Modern Times ===
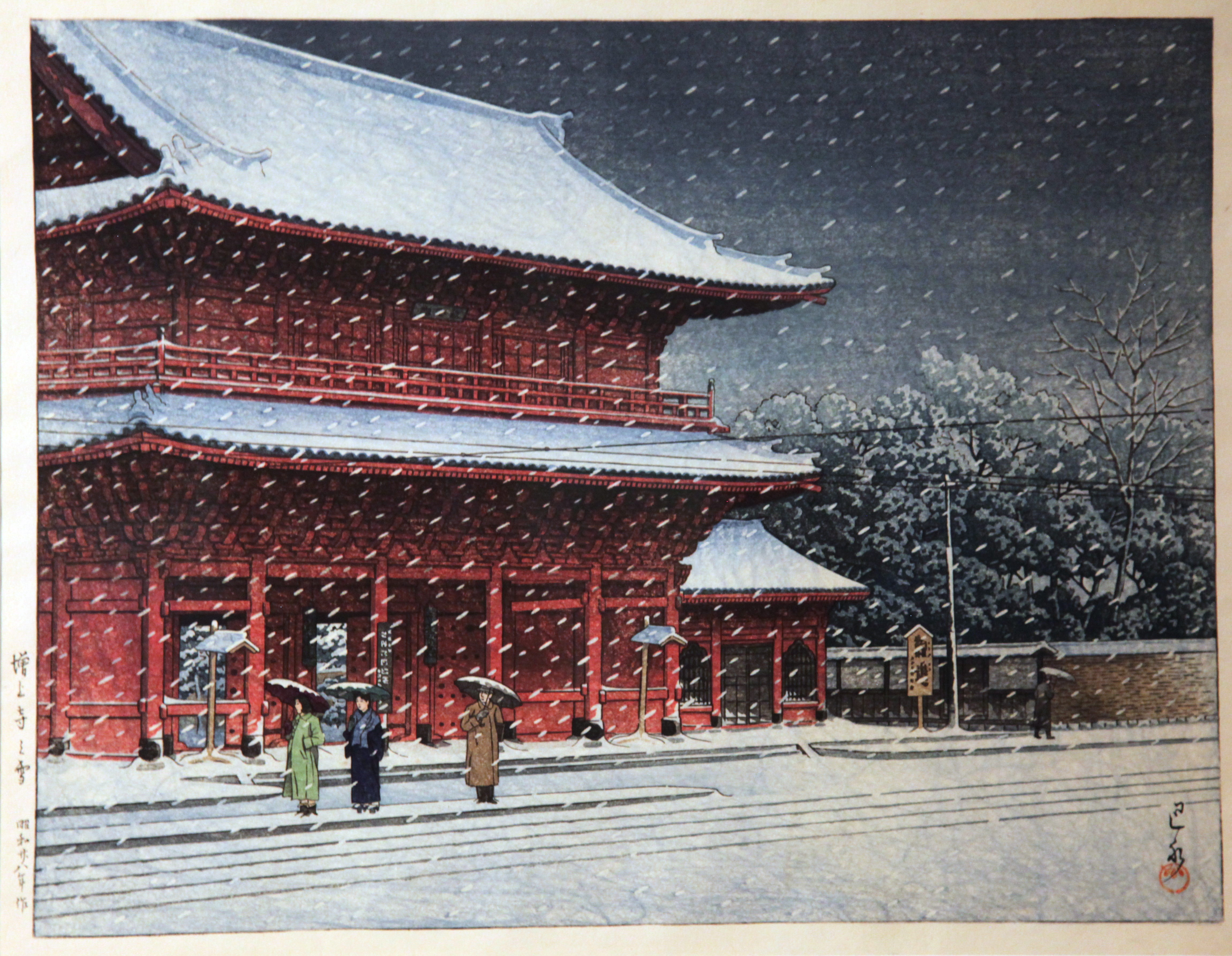
Snow over Zōjō-ji (Shiba, Tokyo)

During the Edo period, the Chinzei-ha flourished under the patronage of the Tokugawa shogunate (1603–1868). Key figures such as Son’ō of Zōjō-ji and Sonshō of Chion-in played instrumental roles in formalizing the structure of Jōdo-shū temples and doctrine. However, with the implementation of the temple registration system (danka-seido), the school also faced challenges in maintaining its doctrinal purity.

The Meiji Restoration brought significant reforms to Buddhism, leading to a decline in institutional power. In response, modern scholars like Fukuda Gyōkai sought to adapt Chinzei-ha teachings to contemporary society, ensuring their continued relevance within Jōdo-shū.
