= Jōkei (monk) =

Historical Japanese spiritual figure

Jōkei (貞慶) (1155–1213) was an influential Buddhist scholar-monk and reformer of the East Asian Yogācāra sect in Japan, posthumously known as Gedatsu Shōnin (解脱上人, "Liberated Master").

Jōkei was a prolific author, asserting and compiling the Yogācāra doctrine while simultaneously refuting newer movements, particularly the Pure Land Buddhism begun by Hōnen. Like his contemporary Myōe, Jōkei aimed to make Buddhism more accessible to the general public by promoting a range of devotional practices centered on figures such as Shakyamuni, Kannon, Jizō, and Maitreya. His pluralist and eclectic teachings thus offer a contrast to the more exclusive Kamakura schools, who focused on one Buddha (Amitabha) or one practice (nembutsu, etc.). Jōkei held that since sentient beings were diverse and not all the same (on the relative level), one practice focused on one Buddha was not suitable for everyone. Jōkei did teach the importance of relying on the "other power" of a Buddha or bodhisattva to attain birth in a Pure Land, but he stressed the Pure Land of Maitreya, not Sukhavati. Jōkei also actively promoted devotion to Gautama Buddha, the historical founder, through devotional practices, access to śarīra (relics of the Buddha), and promotion of the traditional monastic code, the Vinaya.

== Biography ==
Jōkei was born into the prestigious, but rapidly declining, Fujiwara at a time when the Taira clan was gaining ascendancy. Due to his father's and grandfather's involvement with Emperor Go-Shirakawa and the Minamoto clan, the former was exiled while the latter was killed, as depicted in The Tale of the Heike. Jōkei and his siblings took Buddhist tonsure, and Jōkei was admitted to the temple of Kōfuku-ji, the tutelary temple of the Fujiwara, at the age of 11.

Jōkei rapidly rose to prominence for his understanding of Hosso doctrine, and records show that, starting in 1186, he delivered lectures on Buddhist texts, such as the Lotus Sutra, and the Greater Perfection of Wisdom Sutra (Daihannya kyō 大般若経). Prominent aristocrat and chancellor to the Emperor Go-Shirakawa, Fujiwara no Kanezane, described his exposition of the Dharma as "profound," but his voice was so soft that it was difficult to hear.

By 1192, Jōkei unexpectedly moved to a remote temple named Kasagidera, northeast of Nara and far from the Kofuku-ji hierarchy. His move was lamented by Kanezane among others, and even Myōe recorded a dream where the deity of Kasuga-taisha (once part of Kofuku-ji's temple complex) came to him in a dream protesting Jōkei's departure. Research tentatively shows that Jōkei intended to devote more time to the study of Buddhist texts and complete a project to copy the Greater Perfection of Wisdom Sutra, or devote more time to his devotion to the bodhisattva of Maitreya.

Time spent at Kasagidera records numerous building projects, ceremonies, and campaigns to rebuild temples decimated by the Genpei War (including Kōfuku-ji), as well as many recorded lectures. Contrary to his intended seclusion, Jōkei spent considerable time visiting Kyoto and Nara by request to officiate ceremonies or deliver lectures. In 1205, Jōkei completed the Kōfukuji Sōjō (興福寺奏状; "The Kofukuji Petition") in concert with other Buddhist schools in Nara. The petition singled out the exclusive-nembutsu practice of Hōnen, defending the traditional Mahayana position, while requesting that the government put a stop to the rapidly growing movement and followers who allegedly defamed Buddhism and were guilty of antinomianism.

In 1208, Jōkei retired to a temple named Fudaraku Kannon-ji, later renamed to Kaijūsen-ji. The final five years of Jōkei's life represent a very active time in his life, when he attempted to reach a doctrinal reconciliation between the Hosso and Tendai sects, who had been bitter rivals since the time of Tokuitsu and Tendai founder Saichō. Jōkei additionally led a successful revival movement to restore discipline in the monastic community that had declined in the late Heian period, with emphasis on the traditional monastic code, or Prātimokṣa. Jōkei restored Vinaya lineages to Kofuku-ji, Tōshōdai-ji and other temples by 1210, while he gained several prominent disciples, including Eison, through Jōkei's disciple Kainyo, who went on to found the Shingon Risshu sect, and Ryohen, the so-called "Hosso Restorer".

== Bibliography ==
- Tagawa, Shun'ei (2009). Charles Muller (ed.). Living Yogacara: An Introduction to Consciousness-Only Buddhism. Wisdom Publications. ISBN 978-0-86171-589-3.
- Ford, James L. (2002). "Jōkei and the Rhetoric of "Other-Power" and "Easy Practice" in Medieval Japanese Buddhism" (PDF). Japanese Journal of Religious Studies. 29 (1/2): 67–106. Archived from the original on April 7, 2014.
- Ford, James L. (2006). Jokei and Buddhist Devotion in Early Medieval Japan. Oxford University Press, USA. pp. 18–30, 47–50, 101–138. ISBN 978-0-19-518814-1.
- Ford, James L. (2005). "Competing with Amida: A Study and Translation of Jōkei's Miroku Kōshiki". Monumenta Nipponica. 60 (1): 43–79. doi:10.1353/mni.2005.0005. S2CID 128357275 – via Project MUSE.
