= Kempo (era) =

Period of Japanese history (1213–1219 CE)

Kenpo (建保) was a Japanese era name (年号, nengō; lit. "year name") after Kenryaku and before Jōkyū. This period spanned the years from December 1213 through April 1219. The reigning emperor was Juntoku-tennō (順徳天皇).

== Change of era ==
- 1213 Kempo gannen (建保元年): The new era name was created because the previous era ended and a new one commenced in Kenryaku 3, on the 6th day of the 12th month of 1213.

== Events of the Kempo era ==
- 1213 (Kempo 1, 1st day of the 1st month): There was an earthquake at Kamakura.
- 1213 (Kempo 1, 11th month): Fujiwara no Teika, also known as Fujiwara no Sadeie offered a collection of 8th century poems to Shōgun Sanetomo. These poems were collectively known as the Man'yōshū.
- 1214 (Kempo 2, 2nd month): Shōgun Sanetomo, having drunk too much sake, was feeling somewhat uncomfortable; and the Buddhist priest Eisai, who was the grand priest of the Jufuku-ji temple-complex, presented the shōgun with an excellent tea, which restored his good health.
- 1214 (Kempo 2, 3rd month): The emperor went to Kasuga.
- 1214 (Kempo 2, 4th month): A group of militant priests living on Mt. Hiei set fire to the central temple structure at Enryaku-ji. The damage was repaired at the expense of Shōgun Sanetomo.
- 1215 (Kempo 3, 1st month): Hōjō Tokimasa died at age 78 in the mountains of Izu Province.
- 1215 (Kempo 3, 6th month): The well-known priest Eisai died at age 75; his remains were interred at the temple of Kennin-ji which he had founded in Kyoto.
- 1215 (Kempo 3, 8th-9th months): There were many, serial earthquakes in the Kamakura area.
- 1217 (Kempo 5, 8th-9th months): The emperor visited the Shrines at Hirano and at Ōharano near Kyoto.

== Notes ==
Preceded by Kenryaku	Era or nengō Kempo; 1213–1219	Succeeded by Jōkyū
