= Senchakushū =

Buddhist work by Hōnen, founder of the Jōdo-shū

The Senchaku Hongan Nembutsushū (選択本願念仏集), abbreviated to Senchakushū, is the magnum opus of Hōnen, founder of the Jōdo-shū school of Japanese Pure Land Buddhism. The title means "Collection of Selections on Nenbutsu and the Original Vow" and draws upon past Pure Land Buddhist sources, sutras and especially from the writings of Chinese Pure Land Buddhists Shandao and Tan-luan to bolster Hōnen's doctrine of relying upon the sole recitation of Amitābha Buddha's name for rebirth in the Pure Land. Hōnen also asserts for the first time that he is establishing a new school of Buddhism.

Originally the Senchakushū had been composed at the behest of Hōnen's patron and disciple, Lord Kūjō Kanezane, in 1198, but Hōnen was hesitant to show the Senchakushū to a wider audience during his lifetime due to fears of criticism. Instead, he showed the text to his closest disciples only including Benchō, Shinran, Shōkū among others. Hōnen stated that his disciples could do what they wanted with the text after his death, and in time the Senchakushū was distributed among Buddhist circles. Jōkei, Hōnen's strongest critic, analyzed the Senchakushū as part of his refutation of Hōnen's Pure Land doctrine, as did Myōe.

== Format ==
The Senchakushū consists of sixteen chapters and each chapter begins with a heading explaining the content of the chapter and then presents quotations from the Pure Land sutras and the works of major Pure Land scholars, followed by Hōnen's comments and explanations interspersed between and after the various quotes. The Chapter format is as follows:

1. Classification of the Buddhist Teachings
2. The Practices of Pure Land Buddhism
3. Amida's Choice of the Nembutsu in His Original Vow
4. The Nembutsu and the Miscellaneous Practices
5. The Benefits of the Nembutsu
6. The Eternal Endurance of the Nembutsu
7. The Light of Amida Buddha
8. The Faith of Nembutsu Practitioners
9. The Practitioners' Religious Life
10. Amida Buddha's Transformation Body
11. Shakyamuni Buddha's Praise of Nembutsu Practitioners
12. Shakyamuni Buddha's Entrusting of the Nembutsu
13. The Many Good Acts of the Nembutsu
14. The Testimony of the Many Buddhas of the Six Directions
15. The Protection of the Nembutsu Practitioner by the Many Buddhas of the Six Directions
16. The Entrusting of Amida Buddha's Name

== Bibliography ==
- Hōnen; Senchakushū English Translation Project (1998), Hōnen's Senchakushū: Passages on the Selection of the Nembutsu in the Original Vow (Senchaku Hongan Nembutsushū), Honolulu: University of Hawai'i Press.
- Augustine, Morris J., Kondō, Tesshō, trans. (1997). "Senchaku Hongan Nembutsushū": A Collection of Passages on the Nembutsu Chosen in the Original Vow compiled by Genkū (Hōnen), Berkeley, Calif.: Numata Center for Buddhist Translation and Research. ISBN 1-886439-05-2.
