= Zendō-ji (Kurume) =

Buddhist temple in Kurume, Fukuoka, Japan

- 善導寺
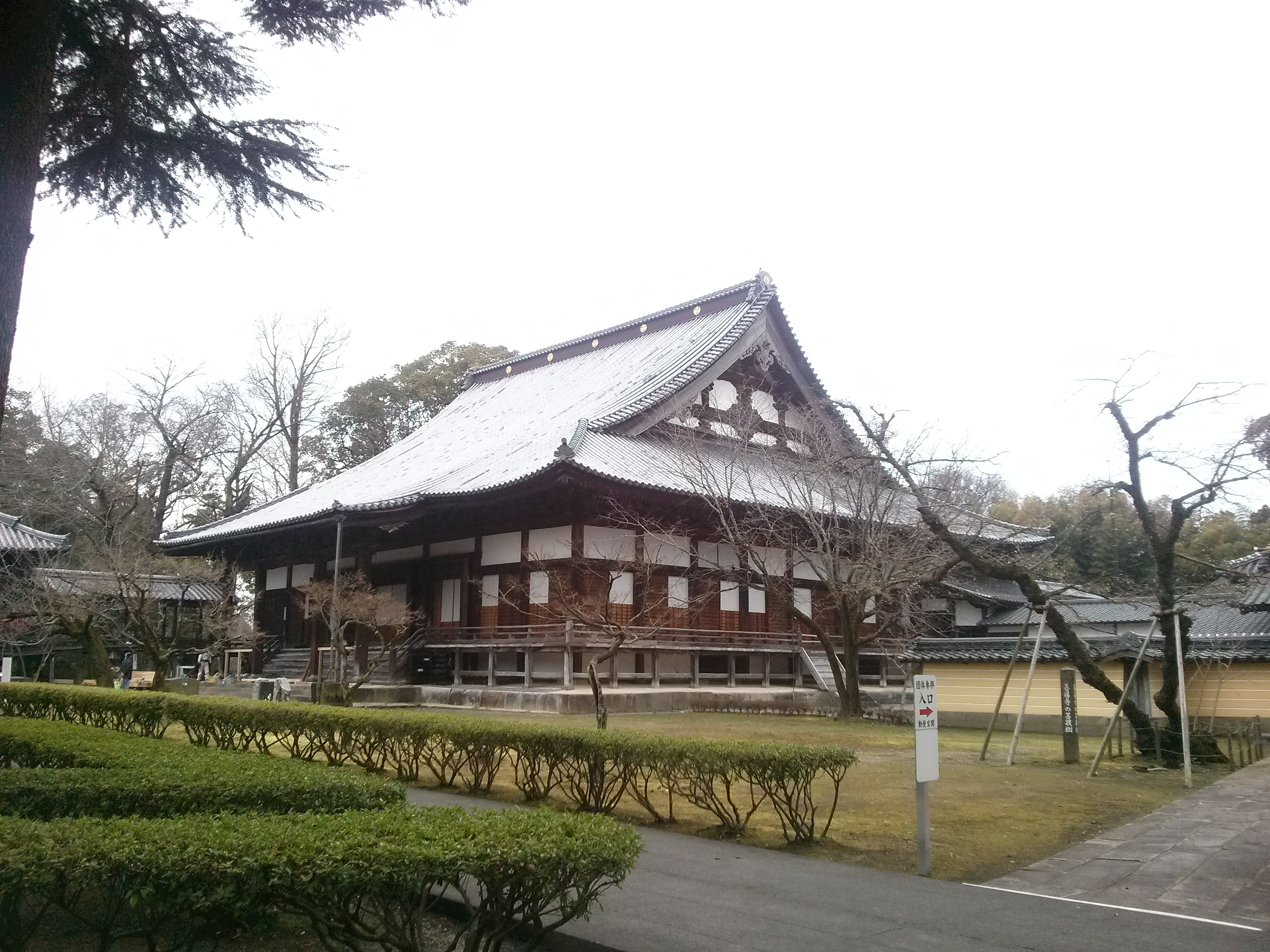

Religion
- Affiliation: Jōdo-shū
- Deity: Amida Nyorai, Yakushi Nyorai

Location
- Location: Iida-550 Zendojimachi, Kurume, Fukuoka 839-0824, Japan
- Interactive map of Zendō-ji
- Coordinates: 33°19′48″N 130°36′14″E

Architecture
- Founder: Benchō
- Completed: 1191

Website
- www.zendoji.jp (in Japanese)

Zendō-ji (善導寺), also called Daihonzan Zendō-ji (大本山 善導寺), is a Jōdo-shū Buddhist temple in Kurume, Fukuoka Prefecture, Japan.

== History ==
Zendō-ji was founded in 1191 by Benchō and by the governor of Chikugo Province, Kusano Eihei (the uncle of Ikko Shunsho). It was originally called Komyo-ji Temple, but in 1217 it was renamed Zendō-ji Temple and became the base of the Jōdo-shū Chinzei sect in Kyushu.

It burned down during war during the Muromachi period, but was rebuilt in the early Edo period with the patronage of Tanaka, the lord of Yanagawa domain.

In 1616, Tadamasa Tanaka invited the Tosho Gongen Shrine to enshrine Tokugawa Ieyasu.

When the Tanaka clan died out without an heir and Chikugo Province was divided into the Yanagawa Domain and the Kurume Domain, the temple came under the control of the Kurume Domain's lord, the Arima Clan, and flourished as the Kyushu head temple of the Jodo sect. Many buildings built during the Edo period remain within the vast grounds.

In 2013, a statue of Hōnen Shonin was made and enshrined in the main hall.

In 2016, the grave of Tachibana Ginchiyo, whose location had been unknown but had been mentioned in ancient documents, was discovered on the temple's grounds.
