= One-Sheet Document =

Final testament of Honen, founder of a branch of Buddhism

The One-Sheet Document (一枚起請文, Ichimai-kishōmon) is a document written by the founder of the Japanese Jōdo-shū Pure Land Buddhism school, Hōnen, two days before his death. The document is meant to summarize Hōnen's teachings for future generations, and serves as his final testament. The document was written on the twenty-third day of the first lunar month of the second year of Kenryaku (1212) and contains fewer than three hundred words. It is regularly read and recited in Jōdo-shū services to this day.

The document affirms Hōnen's belief that ultimately sentient beings are deluded and ignorant, but that by entrusting oneself to Amida Buddha, and through the recitation of the nembutsu, one can be reborn in the Pure Land.

The original Japanese, with romanization is as follows:

唐土我朝に、もろもろの智者達の、沙汰し申さるる観念の念にもあらず。また学問をして、念のこころを悟りて申す念仏にもあらず。ただ往生極楽のためには南無阿弥陀仏と申して、うたがいなく往生するぞと思い取りて申す外には別の仔細候わず。ただし三心四修と申すことの候うは、皆決定して南無阿弥陀仏にて往生するぞと思ううちにこもり候うなり。この外に奥ふかき事を存ぜば、二尊のあわれみにはずれ、本願にもれ候うべし。念仏を信ぜん人は、たとい一代の法をよくよく学すとも、一文不知の愚鈍の身になして、尼入道の無知のともがらに同じうして、知者のふるまいをせずしてただ一向に念仏すべし。証のために両手印をもってす。浄土宗の安心起行この一紙に至極せり。源空が所存、この外に全く別義を存ぜず、滅後の邪義をふせがんがために所存をしるし畢んぬ。

建暦二年正月二十三日 大師在御判

morokoshi wagachō ni, moromoro no chishatachi no, satashi mōsaruru kannen no nen nimo arazu. mata gakumon wo shite, nen no kokoro wo satorite mōsu nenbutsu nimo arazu. tada ōjōgokuraku no tame niwa, namuamidabutsu to mōshite, utagainaku ōjōsuru zoto omoitorite mōsu hoka niwa betsu no shisai sōrawazu. tadashi sanjin shishu to mōsukoto no sōrō wa, mina ketsujō shite namuamidabutsu nite ōjō suru zoto omou uchi ni komori sōrō nari. konohoka ni okufukaki koto wo zonzeba, nison no awaremi ni hazure, hongan ni more sōrō beshi. nenbutsu wo shinzen hito wa tatoi ichidai no hō wo yokuyoku gakusutomo, ichimon-fuchi no gudon no mi ni nashite, ama nyūdō no muchi no tomogara ni onajiu shite, chisha no furumai wo sezu shite tada ikkō ni nenbutsu subeshi. shō no tame ni ryōshuin wo mottesu. jōdoshū no anjin kigyou, kono isshi ni shigoku seri. genkū ga shozon kono hoka ni mattaku betsugi wo zonzezu, metsugo no jagi wo fusegan ga tame ni shozon wo shirushi owannu.
kenryaku ni nen shougatsu nijūsan nichi daishizaigohan

An English translation of the One-Sheet Document is as follows:

In China and Japan, many Buddhist masters and scholars understand that the nembutsu is to meditate deeply on Amida Buddha and the Pure Land. However, I do not understand the nembutsu in this way. Reciting the nembutsu does not come from studying and understanding its meaning. There is no other reason or cause by which we can utterly believe in attaining birth in the Pure Land than the nembutsu itself. Reciting the nembutsu and believing in birth in the Pure Land naturally gives rise to the three minds (sanjin) and the four modes of practice (shishu). If I am withholding any deeper knowledge beyond simple recitation of the nembutsu, then may I lose sight of the compassion of Shakyamuni and Amida Buddha and slip through the embrace of Amida's original vow. Even if those who believe in the nembutsu study the teaching which Shakyamuni taught his whole life, they should not put on any airs and should sincerely practice the nembutsu, just as an illiterate fool, a nun, or one who is ignorant of Buddhism. I hereby authorize this document with my hand print. The Jodo Shu way of the established mind (anjin) is completely imparted here. I, Genku, have no other teaching than this. In order to prevent misinterpretation after my passing away, I make this final testament. January 23, the Second Year of Kenryaku (1212)

There is some controversy regarding translation of the term ama nyūdō (尼入道, "novice nun") as potentially pejorative toward women, but is generally interpreted from a standpoint of humility, not merit.
