= Benchō =

Japanese Buddhist monk (1162–1238)

- 弁長

Personal life
- Born: June 20, 1162
- Died: March 16, 1238 (aged 75)

Religious life
- Religion: Buddhism
- School: Jōdo-shū
- Lineage: Chinzei

Benchō (弁長; June 20, 1162 – March 16, 1238), was a Japanese Buddhist monk and religious leader who was one of the main disciples of the Pure Land founder Hōnen. Also known as Shōkō Shōnin (聖光上人) or Shōkōbō (聖光房), Benchō, is the second patriarch of the Chinzei branch of Jōdo-shū, one of the major schools of Japanese Buddhism. Benchō's missionary efforts in Kyushu, especially Chikushi, and his founding of Zendō-ji temple, led to the establishment of the Chinzei-ha (鎮西流) sect.

== Biography ==
Shōkō-bō Benchō was born in the Katsuki district of Chikuzen, in what is now the Kitakyushu region. He entered Tendai religious training at fourteen, and at twenty-two proceeded to Enryakuji on Mount Hiei in 1183. There he studied under the guidance of Kwanei (観叡) and received ordination from the Hōchi-bō abbot Shōshin (証真). After completing an extensive education in Tendai Buddhism, he returned home in 1190, at the age of twenty-nine, to serve as the principal instructor at a temple on Mount Abura.

=== Hōnen ===
Three years later, in 1197, he went to visit Hōnen at Yoshimizu in Higashiyama, Kyoto. Benchō was thirty-six when he met the sixty-five-year-old Hōnen. Already recognized for his erudition and rhetorical skill, Benchō tested Hōnen by raising detailed questions concerning the central issues of Pure Land doctrine. Hōnen responded with an extended exposition comparing the interpretive positions of Zhiyi, Genshin, and Shandao, and affirmed Shandao’s system as the most comprehensive and appropriate guide for beings of the present age. The discussion continued for ten hours. By its conclusion, Benchō’s doubts and residual pride had been removed. From that time onward he became Hōnen's disciple, and accepted the exclusive nembutsu teaching of by Hōnen.

In early 1198, Hōnen entrusted him with a manuscript of the Senchaku hongan nembutsu-shū, still unpublished at that time due to fear of opposition from established institutions. Benchō was instructed to copy the work, study it thoroughly, and preserve it for future generations. Later that same year, Hōnen dispatched him to Iyo Province to teach. Large numbers of listeners reportedly embraced the nembutsu under his instruction. Over the next six years, he continued to attend upon Hōnen, while repeatedly reading Shandao’s commentary on the Meditation Sūtra.

=== Kyūshū ===
Later, after Hōnen and many of his followers were exiled in 1207, Benchō was exiled on the island of Kyūshū, where he began preaching Pure Land Buddhism. Benchō primarily spread the teachings of the Nenbutsu in Chikugo Province and Higo Province.

During his time in Kyūshū, Benchō continued to write to Hōnen for clarification on difficult matters of interpretation. In the winter of 1228, he conducted a forty-eight-day nembutsu retreat, during which he composed a concise doctrinal treatise designed to eliminate misunderstandings regarding nembutsu practice. Upon finishing the work, he reported a visionary encounter in which Hōnen appeared and affirmed the accuracy of his exposition.

Benchō also engaged in further extended ascetic practice. At Kuriyadera (now known as Chuzan Shōkōin Anyōji) at the foot of Mount Kōra in Chikugo Province, he undertook a thousand-day nembutsu retreat. According to hagiographical accounts, monks from Mount Kōya, hostile to his presence, abandoned their opposition after witnessing a collective visionary sign: a radiant western light accompanied by a declaration that the Buddha was manifesting his radiance because of Benchō’s practice. Thereafter they are said to have acknowledged him with respect.

Later, Benchō established a temple named Zendō-ji in Chikugo, later renamed Komyōji, which became the center of his teaching activity, He also opened other temples like Ōjōin Temple in Shirakawa, Higo Province. Benchō's daily practice was extensive, reportedly including six recitations of the Amitābha Sūtra, six formal offerings, and sixty thousand repetitions of Namu Amida Butsu. He maintained that the nembutsu could never be practiced to excess.

Benchō died on the fifteenth day of the first month of 1238. Prior to his death he experienced a raigō vision of Amitābha and an assembly of celestial beings coming to receive him.

His admonitions to his disciples are encapsulated in his short teaching:

To awaken and maintain true confidence, the essential thing is to be always thinking of death and of the Buddha. Who knows whether death may not come after any breath we draw! So we should always be mindful of this, and keep saying in our hearts, "Buddha of Infinite Light and Life, help me! Namu Amida Butsu!"

Benchō was succeeded by the third patriarch, Ryōchū (良忠, 1199–1287), who formally established the Chinzei branch.

== Teachings ==
Benchō's teaching is closely based on that of Hōnen, though he also draws on classic Pure Land authors like Shandao and Genshin to defend his interpretations of Hōnen. Hōnen's disciples were divided on several issues, and Benchō was part of the conservative faction which stressed extensive nembutsu practice, and rejected the "ichinengi" (once calling) position—the view that one only needed to say the nembutsu one time. According to Jacqueline Stone, the conservative faction "stressed cultivating faith through cumulative nenbutsu chanting up until the end of life and also recommended supporting practices such as sutra recitation, meditation, or precept observance, subsuming these traditional disciplines within a tariki interpretive framework."

Benchō's teachings thus stressed constant religious practice, especially the nembutsu. His Matsudai nembutsu jushuin emphasizes that chanting the nembutsu is the true practice that leads to birth in the Pure Land, though it can be augmented by sutra recitation (dokuji), meditation (kanzatsu), worship (raihai) and praises and offerings (sandan kuyō). For Benchō, the practice of nembutsu done is three main contexts: daily routines, in special retreats, and at deathbed rites. Pure Land practices are grounded in the threefold mind: the sincere mind (shijōshin), the mind of profound faith (jinshin), and the mind that offers one's merits in aspiration for birth in the pure land (eko hōtsugan shin). Over time Benchō's teachings were described under the “Unifying One-Act Samādhi” (Kekkai Ichigyō Zanmai), a framework that saw all principal Pure Land practices (the Three Minds, Five Gates of Mindfulness, Four Modes of Practice, and Three Kinds of Conduct) as being included in the nembutsu.

=== Tanengi ===
Benchō is particularly known for his vigorous defense of the tanengi (many callings) position, the insistence that the nenbutsu should be recited extensively by practitioners. He critiqued those who upheld the ichinengi (once calling) view that a single faithful recitation of Namo Amida Butsu is enough. In his Nenbutsu Myōgishū, he writes that "recently, the Nenbutsu is being recited in various disordered ways, and it has become complicated, distorted, and diverse". He criticizes those who say that we should "discard the 30,000 or 60,000 repetition of the nenbutsu! It is precisely those who do not know the meaning of nenbutsu who recite such large numbers." According to Benchō, those who said these things and rejected extensive recitation of the nembutsu were distorting Hōnen’s teaching.

The views that Benchō criticized are associated with the "ichinen" doctrine of figures like Kōsai (1163–1247). Benchō's emphasis of extensive practice places him in a group of Hōnen disciples that modern scholars have termed the "Self-Power faction" (jiriki-ha), since they tended to emphasize making effort on the Pure Land path and practicing as much as one was able. This contrasts with those who of the "Other-Power faction" (tariki-ha) who emphasized faith in other-power, like Shinran (1173–1262), Shōkū (1177–1247), and Kōsai.

=== Nembutsu ===
Benchō's interpretation of nembutsu was notably inclusive. Unlike more exclusivist defenders of vocal nembutsu who rejected or de-emphasized other practices, Benchō accepted the validity of "miscellaneous practices" for attaining rebirth as provisional methods. He placed significant emphasis on specific practices detailed in the Ōjōyōshū that Hōnen had minimized, namely the "Three Modes of Practice." This included detailed prescriptions for "Fixed-time Observances" (prolonged, dedicated nembutsu sessions done for specific lengths of time) and extensive "Deathbed Observances," and he also valued contemplative nembutsu and the goal of "seeing the Buddha". Thus, while centering his teaching on the easy practice of vocal nembutsu, Benchō's interpretations focused on incorporating and defending a broader range of practices into the Pure Land school.

Benchō's recognition and promotion of meditative nembutsu practice, such as those taught by Genshin, contrasts his approach with those of other disciples of Hōnen like Myōhen and Shinran who did not see these practices as important, and who even rejected them as self-powered practices that might lead to arrogance. While accepting that birth in the Pure Land can be achieved with a scattered mind, Benchō affirmed the importance of attaining samadhi (meditative absorption) through nembutsu practice which could lead to visions of the Buddha, writing that "the aim of nembutsu is seeing the Buddha." He saw this concentrated meditative nembutsu as a superior practice to reciting with an unfocused mind.

Thus, Benchō taught that effective Pure Land cultivation includes both the vocal nenbutsu itself (the main practice according to Hōnen as his disciples) and other Pure Land–related auxiliary practices. Benchō proposed a schema in which all Buddhist practices are included in either a broad, inclusive nenbutsu (sō no nembutsu) or in the distinct practice of invoking Amida’s name (betsu no nembutsu), contending that the latter ultimately subsumes every other form of Buddhist discipline. However, he also held that "when the five kinds [of nembutsu] are considered separately, there is no superiority or inferiority among them; they are equal." This indicates an attitude that is more open to other forms of nembutsu practice other than the primary practice of vocal recitation emphasized by Hōnen.

Based on his reading of texts like Nāgārjuna's Daśabhūmikavibhāṣā (J: Jūjūbibasharon) Benchō also held that if the Buddha's other-power is present, self-power practices can have some place in the Pure Land Dharma Gate. He even argues that reciting the names of other Buddhas and bodhisattvas can be considered to be within the scope of the Easy Path of Pure Land.

=== Deathbed practice ===
Benchō insisted on the importance of reciting nembutsu and establishing right mindfulness at the time of death. He also defended the efficacy of traditional deathbed nembutsu rites against other nembutsu followers who were beginning to question them, like Shinran. According to Benchō, at the time of death:

One should set up before the sick person a buddha image and that individual's personal sutra, being sure to attach the cords, ready lamps, burn incense, and provide flowers. Without fail one should strike the chimes and chant the nenbutsu, waiting for the dying person's breath to cease and for Amida and Kannon to come in welcome.

Benchō also criticized those who question these practices. As Jacqueline Stone writes, for Benchō, "preparing for the last thought is the most essential business of one's lifetime: those who do not chant the nenbutsu at the end do not reach the Pure Land. One who chants the nenbutsu earnestly in life will surely be able to carry out the deathbed practice. Besides, he adds, the whole spirit of the question is misguided: a serious practitioner. in keeping with the virtue of assiduousness (virya, shajin), will strive to do more, not less."

Benchō also defends the importance of the presence of a zenchishiki (guiding teacher) during the deathbed rite, writing that Hōnen himself had acted in this role for some of his disciples. He compared dying without a guiding zenchishiki as "trying to fly without wings or cross the sea without a boat", writing that "A bold warrior, in subduing the enemy, makes use of a bow and arrows as well as a sword ... a zenchishiki is like a great general who arouses the conditions for ojo [birth in the Pure Land]." He also says that a guiding teacher can help someone who has become disoriented practice repentance and clear away karmic hindrances during one's death.

Benchō also stated that diligently practicing nembutsu extensively during this lifetime helps people attain right mindfulness at the time of death.

Benchō was especially concerned about a "certain faction" of Pure Land practitioners who held that the manner of one's death did not matter, and that as long as one chanted nembutsu one would attain birth in the Pure Land. During the Kamakura period, most Buddhists attached great significance to the way one died. Those who died in agony or in a state of confusion were generally held not to have attained a good rebirth, while those who died peacefully and received visions or good omens were believed to have attained birth in the Pure Land. Because of this, extensive deathbed rites that included much nembutsu chanting by monks were common. Nevertheless, certain followers of Hōnen, like Shinran, began to de-emphasize these beliefs, arguing that what truly mattered for birth in the Pure Land was true faith (shinjin).

Benchō critiques this position however, writing:

A good death is when [the pain of] the last illness abates, so that the dying do not suffer but pass away as though falling asleep, with a composed mind and palms pressed together, having said "Namu-Amida-butsu" as their final words. Or if purple clouds gather, or if the dying see radiant light or behold a transformation buddha, that signals birth in the Pure Land in the upper grades .... A bad death is when they thrash about, spit blood, or become deranged before dying... All such persons all into the three evil paths.

=== Faith ===
Benchō's other doctrines are also generally conservative, relying on traditional Pure Land texts such as those of Hōnen and Shandao. For example, his exposition of the practice of nembutsu emphasizes the necessity of having the "three minds" (三心) as taught by Shandao (the sincere mind, the deep mind, and the that seeks birth in the Pure Land by transferring one's merit).

For Benchō, maintaining a faithful state of mind is very important when reciting nembutsu. However, this does not require a complete lack of doubt or perfect understanding. Even a fool who has simple faith in the nembutsu and Amida can gain the three minds. Thus, he writes:

However, what the late Hōnen Shōnin taught directly is that possessing the Three Minds is easy. If one understands by seeing through what Shandao declared, then any ignorant person can easily possess the Three Minds. As one earnestly rejoices in the Pure Land of Utmost Bliss, and recites while coloring one's heart with Amida Buddha, the Three Minds are naturally and spontaneously possessed."

=== Precepts ===
Benchō, together with his disciple Ryōchū are also important for establishing formal ordination in the bodhisattva precepts as a key element of Jōdo-shū master-disciple lineages, though it was really only at the time of Shōgei that this became fully formalized. This formal ordination was based on the Bodhisattva Precept Ceremony (Ju bosatsu kaigi 授菩薩戒儀 which they received from the Tendai tradition. The precepts were considered useful auxiliary practices. This element sharply contrasts the Jōdo-shū with the Shinshū tradition who set aside all precepts and developed its own tradition of ordination.

== Writings ==
Benchō produced several doctrinal works to systematize Hōnen’s teachings, as well as to resolve doctrinal tensions that had emerged within the early Pure Land movement. His key works include:

- Matsudai Nenbutsu Jushuin (末代念仏授手印, "Handprint for the Transmission of the Nembutsu to Future Generations"), which contained a full account of the teachings that Benchō heard directly from Hōnen.
- Nembutsu ojo shugyomon (The Way of Practice for Birth by the Nembutsu) which counters the teachings from certain Pure Land figures, especially Kōsai and the "single-nembutsu" followers.
- Nenbutsu Myōgishū
- Tetsu Senchakushū, a commentary on the Senchakushū
- Jōdo Shū Yōshū (Essentials of the Pure Land School)
- Jōdo Shū Meimoku Mondō
