= Myōe =

Japanese Buddhist monk

Myōe 明恵
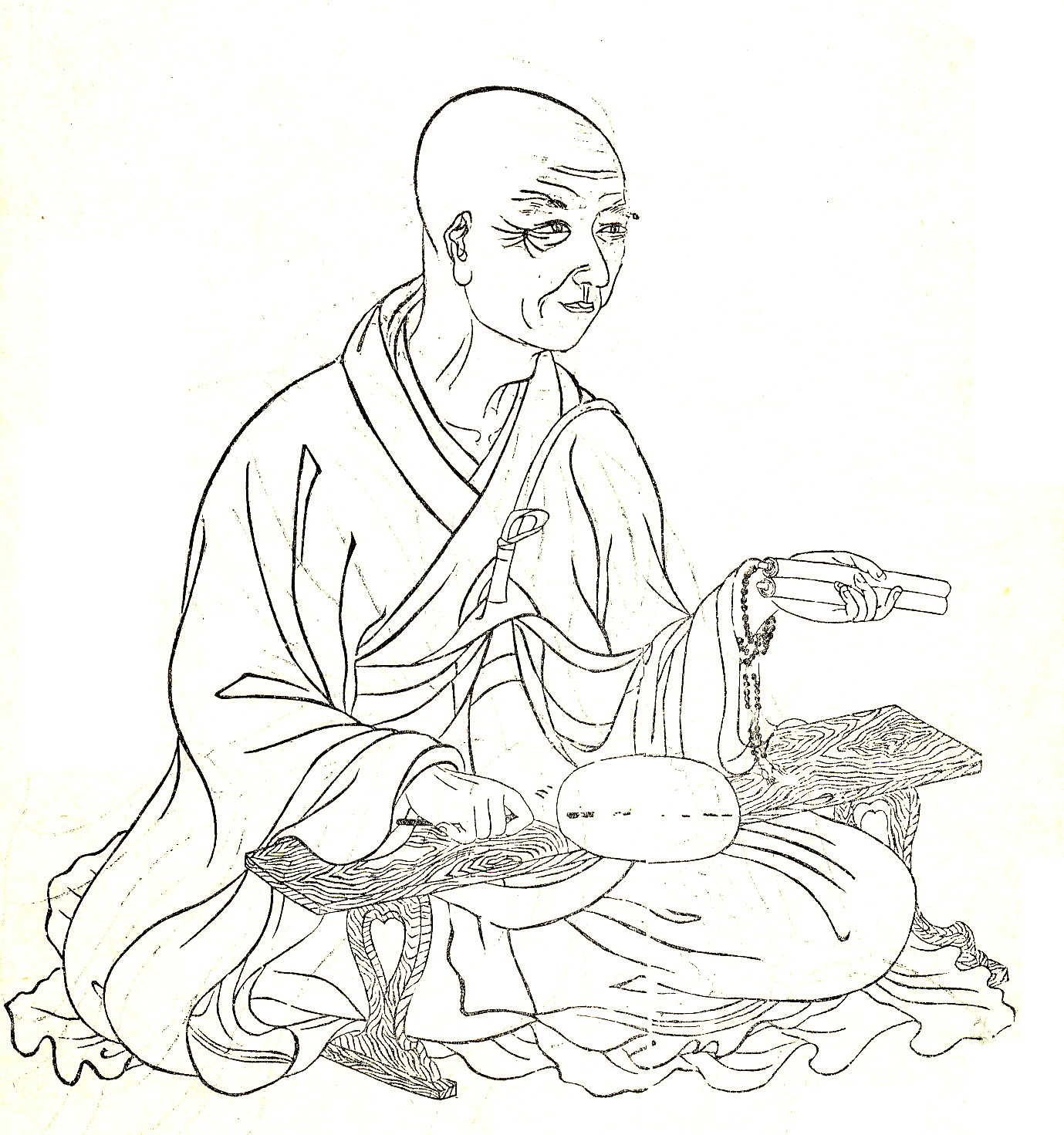
- Myōe from woodblock print catalog Shūko Jusshu, mid-Edo Period
- Born: February 21, 1173; Yoshiwara village, Kii Province, Japan
- Died: February 11, 1232 (aged 58); Kii Province, Japan

Myōe (明恵) (February 21, 1173 – February 11, 1232) was a Japanese Buddhist monk active during the Kamakura period who also went by the name Kōben (Japanese: 高弁, Chinese: 高辨, Gāo Biàn). He was a contemporary of Jōkei and Hōnen.

== Biography ==
Myōe was born in what is now the town of Aridagawa, Wakayama. His mother was the fourth daughter of Yuasa Muneshige, a local strongman who claimed descent from Taira no Shigekuni, and from thence Emperor Takakura. His childhood name was Yakushi-maru. Orphaned at the age of nine, he was educated at Jingo-ji north of Kyoto by a disciple of Mongaku and was ordained as a priest in 1188 at Tōdai-ji. He was trained in both the Kegon and Kusha schools and trained in Shingon at Ninna-ji. He later also studied Zen Buddhism under Eisai, all by the age of 20. In medieval Japan, it was not uncommon for monks to be ordained in multiple sectarian lineages, and Myōe alternately signed his treatises and correspondence as a monk of various schools through much of his career.

However, at the age of 21, he refused a request to participate in a national debate on the various schools of Buddhism, and at the age of 23 he broke off all ties with secular society and sought solitude in the mountains of Arida District in Kii Province, leaving behind a waka poem expressing his disgust for the politics of the various schools of Buddhism. Around this time, he cut off his right ear with a razor as a symbol of his rejection with society. At around the age of 26, he moved to Yamashiro Province, but after short time he returned to Kii Province where he spent the next eight years, living a nomadic existence. Myōe sought twice to go to India, in 1203 and 1205, to study what he considered true Buddhism amidst the perceived decline of the Dharma, but on both occasions, the kami of the Kasuga-taisha urged him to remain in Japan through oracle.

In 1206, he served as abbot of Kōzan-ji (高山寺), a temple of the Kegon school located near Kyoto, where he sought to unify the teachings of the various schools of Buddhism around the Āvataṃsaka Sūtra. Myōe is perhaps most famous for his contributions to the practice and popularization of the Mantra of Light, a mantra associated with Shingon Buddhism but widely used in other Buddhist sects. Myōe is also well known for keeping a journal of his dreams for over 40 years—which continues to be studied by Buddhists and Buddhist scholars—and for his efforts to revive monastic discipline along with Jōkei.

Myōe also strove to find ways to make the teachings of esoteric Buddhism more understandable to lay people; on the other hand, during his lifetime he was a scathing critic of his contemporary, Hōnen, and the new Pure Land Buddhist. As a response to the increasing popularity of the exclusive nembutsu practice, Myōe wrote two treatises, the Zaijarin (摧邪輪, "Breaking the Circle of Heresy") and the follow-up Zaijarin Shōgonki (摧邪輪荘厳記, "Breaking the Circle of Heresy—Elaboration") that sought to refute Honen's teachings as laid out in the Senchakushū. Myōe agreed with Hōnen's criticism of the establishment, but felt that sole practice of the nembutsu was too restrictive and disregarded important Buddhist themes in Mahayana Buddhism such as the bodhicitta and the concept of upāya. Nevertheless, Myōe also lamented the necessity of writing such treatises: "By nature I am pained by that which is harmful. I feel this way about writing the Zaijarin."

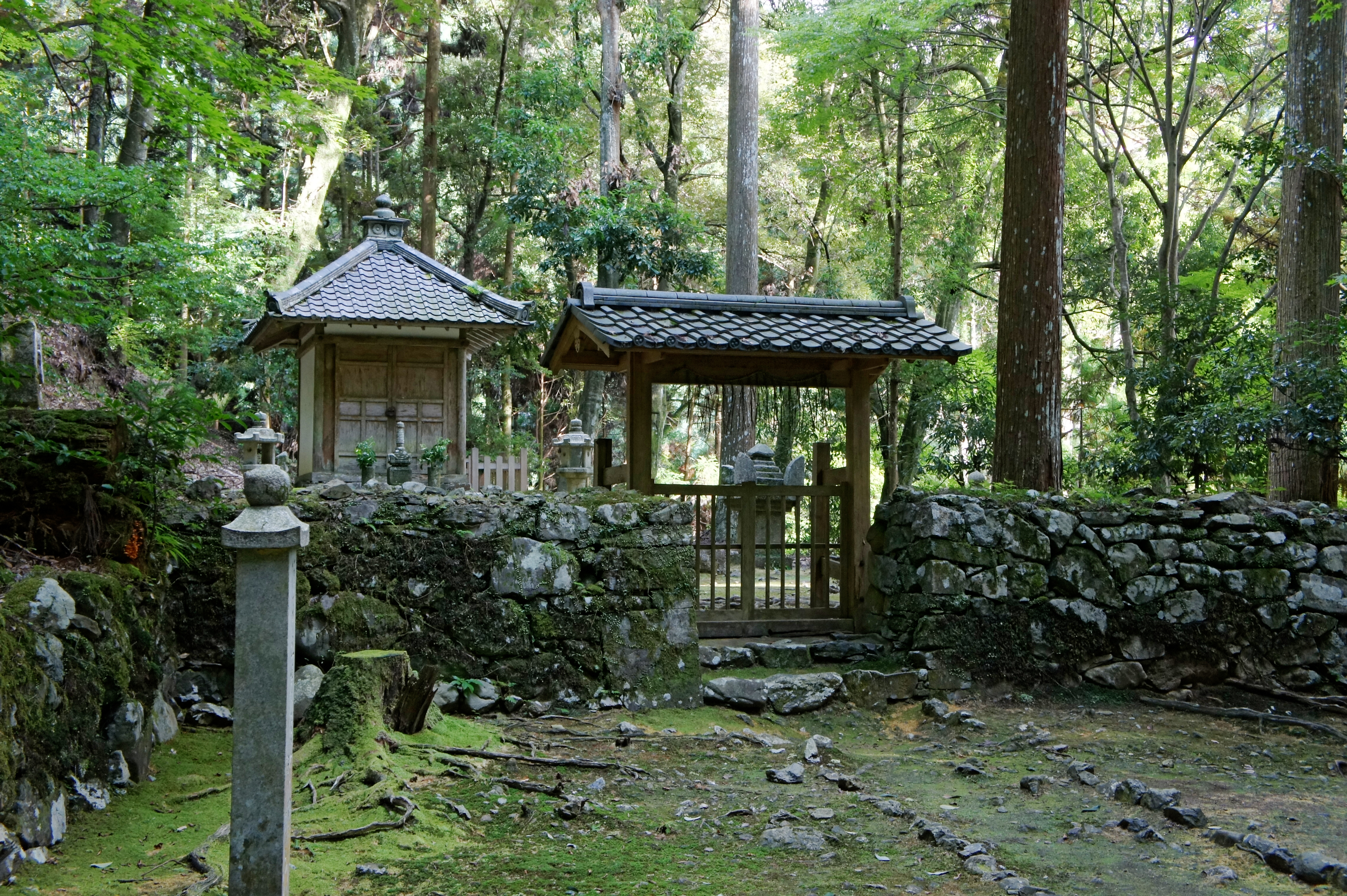
Myōe's grave in Kōzan-ji

In the later years of his life, Myōe wrote extensively on the meaning and application of the Mantra of Light. Myōe's interpretation of the Mantra of Light was somewhat unorthodox, in that he promoted the mantra as a means of being reborn in Sukhāvatī, the Pure Land of Amitābha, rather than a practice for attaining enlightenment in this life as taught by Kūkai and others. Myōe was a firm believer in the notion of Dharma Decline and sought to promote the Mantra of Light as a means of intercession.

Myōe was equally critical of the lax discipline and corruption of the Buddhist establishment, and removed himself from the capital of Kyoto as much as possible. At one point, to demonstrate his resolve to follow the Buddhist path, Myōe knelt before an image of the Buddha at Kōzan-ji, and cut off his own ear. Supposedly, the blood stain can still be seen at the temple to this day. Records for the time show that the daily regimen of practices for the monks at Kōzan-ji, during Myoe's administration, included zazen meditation, recitation of the sutras and the Mantra of Light. These same records show that even details such as cleaning the bathroom regularly were routinely enforced. A wooden tablet titled Arubekiyōwa (阿留辺畿夜宇和, "As Appropriate") still hangs in the northeast corner of the Sekisui'in Hall at Kōzan-ji detailing various regulations.

At the same time, Myōe was also pragmatic and often adopted practices from other Buddhist sects, notably Zen, if it proved useful. Myōe firmly believed in the importance of upāya and sought to provide a diverse set of practices for both monastics and lay people. In addition, he developed new forms of mandalas that utilized only Japanese calligraphy and the Sanskrit Siddhaṃ script. Similar styles were utilized by Shinran and Nichiren. The particular style of mandala he devised, and the devotional rituals surrounding it, are recorded in his treatise, the Sanji Raishaku ("Thrice-Daily Worship") written in 1215.

In 1231, he was invited by the Yuasa clan to open the temple of Semui-ji in his hometown in Kii Province. The day following the ceremony, on January 19, 1232, he died at the age of 58.

== Monastic regulations promulgated by Myōe ==
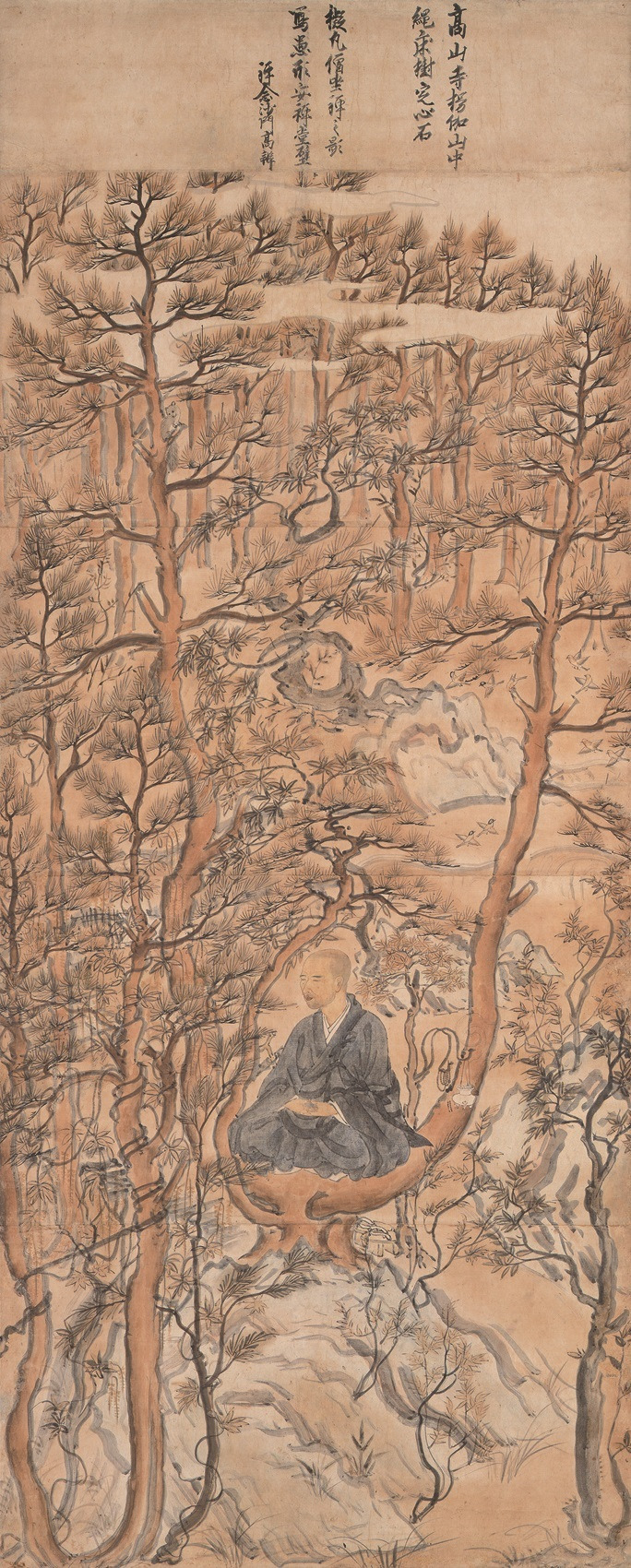
Hanging scroll depicting the monk Myōe, dated to 13th century Kamakura period

In the wooden tablet at Kōzan-ji, Myōe listed the following regulations to all monks, divided into three sections: (Note: Reprinted with permission from Professor Mark Unno from the book Shingon Refractions: Myōe and the Mantra of Light)

As Appropriate

- 06:00 – 08:00 PM: Liturgy: Yuishin kangyō shiki (唯心観行式, "Manual on the Practice of Contemplating the Mind-Only").
- 08:00 – 10:00 PM: Practice once. Chant the Sambōrai (三宝礼, "Revering the Three Treasures").
- 10:00 – 12:00 AM: Zazen (seated meditation). Count breaths.
- 12:00 – 06:00 AM: Rest for three [two-hour] periods.
- 06:00 – 08:00 AM: Walking meditation once. (Inclusion or exclusion should be appropriate to the occasion). Liturgy: Rishukyō raisan (理趣経礼賛, "Ritual Repentance Based on the Sutra of the Ultimate Meaning of the Principle") and the like.
- 08:00 – 10:00 AM: Sambōrai. Chant scriptures for breakfast and intone the Kōmyō Shingon (Mantra of Light) forty-nine times.
- 10:00 – 12:00 PM: Zazen. Count breaths.
- 12:00 – 02:00 PM: Noon meal. Chant the Goji Shingon (五字真言, "Mantra of the Five Syllables") five hundred times.
- 02:00 – 04:00 PM: Study or copy scriptures.
- 04:00 – 06:00 PM: Meet with the master (Myōe) and resolve essential matters.

Etiquette in the Temple Study Hall

- Do not leave rosaries or gloves on top of scriptures.
- Do not leave sōshi [bound] texts on top of round meditation cushions or on the half tatami-size cushions [placed under round cushions].
- During the summer, do not use day-old water for mixing ink.
- Do not place scriptures under the desk.
- Do not lick the tips of brushes.
- Do not reach for something by extending one's hand over scriptures.
- Do not enter [the hall] wearing just the white undergarment robes.
- Do not lie down.
- Do not count [pages] by moistening one's fingers with saliva. Place an extra sheet of paper under each sheet of your sōshi texts.

Etiquette in the Buddha-Altar Hall

- Keep the clothes for wiping the altar separate from that for wiping the Buddha [statue].
- During the summer (from the first day of the fourth month to the last day of the seventh month), obtain fresh water [from the well] morning and evening for water offerings.
- Keep the water offerings and incense burners for buddhas and bodhisattvas separate from those for patriarchs.*
- When you are seated on the half-size cushions, do not bow with your chin up.
- Do not place nose tissues and the like under the half-tatami size cushions.
- Do not let your sleeves touch the offering-water bucket.
- Do not put the [altar] rings on the wooden floor; they should be placed high.
- Place a straw mat at your usual seat.
- The regular sutra for recitation is one fascicle of the Āvataṃsaka Sūtra (or half a fascicle). The three sutras should be read alternately every day.
- When traveling, you should read them after returning.
- The Gyōganbon ("Chapter on Practice and Vow"), Yuigyōkyō ("Sutra of the Buddha's Last Teachings"), and Rokkankyō ("Sutra in Six Fascicles") should all be read alternately one fascicle a day.

— The Kegon School Shamon Kōben [Myoe]

== Myōe Kishū cenotaphs ==
The Myōe Kishū Cenotaphs (明恵紀州遺跡率都婆, Myōe Kishū iseki sotsu tōba) are a group of memorial stones erected by Myōe's disciple Kikai shortly after Myōe's death. A total of seven cenotaphs were constructed, one at the place of his birth, and the other six at locations in Kii Province where he had trained. Originally made of stone, they were replaced by sandstone in 1345. Each is made of sandstone, from 1.5 to 1.7 meters high, with a capstone. Four are located in the town of Aridagawa, two in the town of Yuasa, and one in the city of Arida. Six of the seven were designated a National Historic Site in 1931. The original seventh cenotaph (located in Aridagawa) was lost and replaced in 1802, and was excluded from the designation.

== See also ==
- Schools of Buddhism
- Japanese Buddhism
- Shingon
- Kegon
- Keisei, a student of Myōe
