= Hōnen =

12th-century Japanese Buddhist monk; founder of the Jōdo-shū sect

Hōnen (法然)
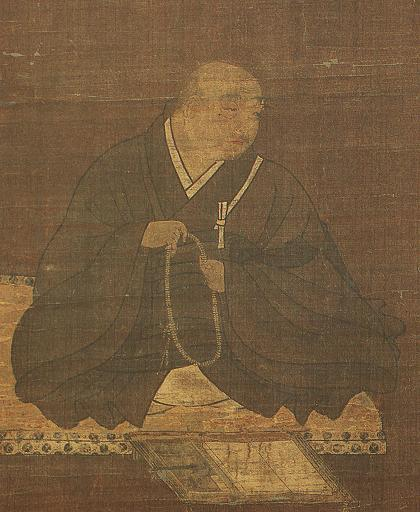
- Portrait of Honen by Fujiwara Takanobu, 12th Century
- Title: Founder of Jōdo-shū

Personal life
- Born: Seishimaru; May 13 (April 7), 1133 Kume, Okayama Prefecture, Japan
- Died: February 29, 1212 (aged 78) Kyoto, Japan
- Other name: Genkū (源空)

Religious life
- Religion: Buddhism
- School: Jōdo-shū school of Pure Land Buddhism
- Lineage: Tendai, Sammon lineage

Hōnen (法然; Japanese pronunciation: [hoꜜː.neɴ], May 13 (April 7), 1133 – February 29, 1212), also known as Genkū, was the founding figure of the Jōdo-shū (浄土宗; "Pure Land School"), the first independent branch of Japanese Pure Land Buddhism.

Hōnen became a Tendai initiate at an early age, but grew disaffected and sought an approach to Buddhism that all people of all classes and genders could follow, even during the current Age of Dharma Decline. After reading Shandao's Commentary on the Amitāyus Contemplation Sūtra, Hōnen devoted himself to attaining birth in the pure land of Amitābha Buddha (Amida) through the practice of "recitation of the Buddha's name" (Jp: nembutsu) and to spreading this teaching among all people.

Hōnen gathered a wide array of followers and attracted numerous critics. He taught them all the simple practice of reciting "Namo Amida Butsu" while entrusting oneself to Amida's universal vow power. Hōnen's Pure Land teaching was very popular among laypersons, and was a major influence on the Buddhism of the Kamakura period. He was the first Japanese author to have his writings in Chinese and Japanese printed in the history of Japanese Buddhism.

After receiving many criticisms of Hōnen from various rival traditions and following an incident at court, Emperor Tsuchimikado exiled Hōnen and his followers in 1207. Hōnen was eventually pardoned and allowed to return to Kyoto, where he stayed for a short time before his death. Hōnen was a teacher to Shinran, the founder of Jōdo Shinshū, the other major Japanese Pure Land tradition. As such, he is also considered the Seventh Patriarch in the Shinshū tradition.

== Biography ==
=== Early life ===
Hōnen was born to a prominent family in the city of Kume in Okayama, Mimasaka Province. His father was Uruma no Tokikuni, a province official who headed up policing in the area. According to legend, his mother is a descendant of the Hata clan. Hōnen was originally named Seishimaru after the bodhisattva Seishi (Sanskrit: Mahāsthāmaprāpta). In 1141 Hōnen's father was assassinated by Sada-akira, an official sent by Emperor Horikawa to govern the province. It is believed that Tokikuni's last words to his son were "Don't hate the enemy but become a monk and pray for me and for your deliverance."

Fulfilling his father's wishes, Hōnen was initiated into his uncle's monastery at the age of nine. From then on, Hōnen lived his life as a monk, and at thirteen, ordained to study at the primary Tendai temple in Mount Hiei near Kyoto. Clerics at Mt. Hiei took the bodhisattva vows and then undertook 12 years of training, a system developed by the Tendai founder, Saichō. While at Mt. Hiei, Hōnen studied under Genkō (源光), Kōen (皇円) and later, with Eikū (叡空). Under Kōen he was officially ordained as a Tendai priest, while under Eikū he received the name Hōnen-bō Genkū (法然房源空). In speaking of himself, Hōnen often referred to himself as Genkū, as did his close disciples.

=== Departure from Mount Hiei ===
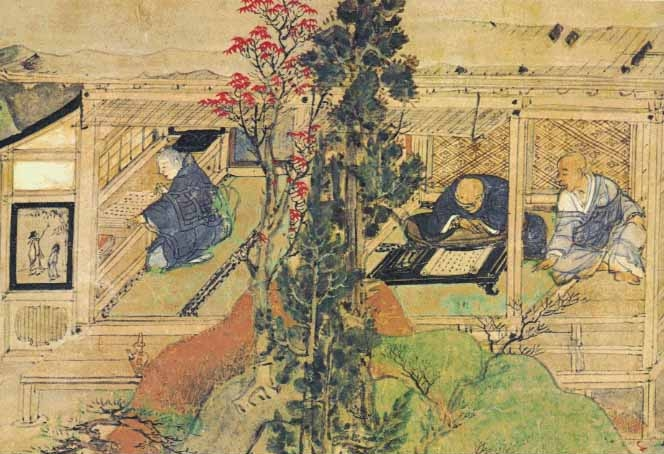
Hōnen studying the three scriptures of the Tendai school at Mount Hiei, from the Honen Shonin Eden (Chion-in Version), an Illustrated biography of Hōnen c. 14th century

In 1150, Hōnen left Mt. Hiei for the more peaceful temple of Kurodani, seeking to live in seclusion. Hōnen eventually grew dissatisfied with the teachings at Mt. Hiei. At the age of 24, Hōnen then went to study at the city of Saga, then Nara, and stayed at such temples at Kōfuku-ji and Tōdai-ji. Still not satisfied, he returned to the libraries of Mt. Hiei and studied further. During this time, Hōnen was deeply affected by the contrast between the suffering of the common people and the lives of elite Buddhist monks and their ornate temples. He began to seek a path that would allow all people to liberation, not just the elites and the monks.

During this period, Hōnen is said to have studied the Chinese Buddhist canon five times. He was deeply impressed when, at the age of forty three, he read the Commentary on the Meditation Sutra (Chinese: 觀經四帖疏; pinyin: Guānjīng Sìtièshū) by the Chinese Pure Land master Shandao (613–681). He was particularly struck by the following passage:

To recite intently and single-mindedly the name of Buddha Amitabha while walking, standing, sitting, or lying down, without regard for the length of time; to engage without cessation in the recitation of nembutsu for life: This is called the rightly established practice because it is in accordance with the essential vow of Buddha Amitabha.

This commentary persuaded Hōnen to believe that the nembutsu (Ch: nianfo, the faithful recitation of Amida Buddha's name), was all one needed to enter Amitābha's Pure Land and attain Buddhahood. Previously, nianfo was recited along with other practices, but Shandao was the first to propose that only nianfo was necessary. This new appreciation and understanding prompted Hōnen to leave Mt. Hiei in 1175 and to focus on the single-minded practice of nembutsu.

=== A rising figure in the capital ===
Hōnen relocated to the district of Ōtani in Kyoto (the capital of Japan at the time), where he began to teach the simple recitation of the nembutsu to crowds of laymen and women, establishing a considerable following. Hōnen taught that through this simple practice, all people could attain Buddhahood in the Pure Land. One did not need to become a monk or meditate intensively, just say the name of the Buddha with faith.

During this time, the conflict between the Minamoto and the Taira clans (which would culminate in the Genpei War of 1180–1185) plunged the nation into chaos. Many people flocked to the capital seeking refuge and Hōnen's teaching of universal salvation through the nembutsu became very appealing. During this time, he also traveled around the Kansai region, and he likely also encountered various nembutsu hijiri (nembutsu holy people) who may have influenced his thought.

Hōnen's teaching attracted all sorts of people, from samurai like Kumagai Naozane, to merchants, prostitutes, robbers, and other elements of society normally excluded from Buddhist practice. Hōnen was a man of recognition in Kyoto, and many priests and nobleman allied with him and visited him for spiritual advice. The increasing popularity of his teachings drew criticism from noted contemporaries as Chikai, Myōe and Jōkei among others, who argued against Hōnen's sole reliance on nembutsu as a means of rebirth in a Pure Land. This led to a public debate (known as the Ohara Controversy) in 1186 between Hōnen and some monks representing other schools. Hōnen's popularity rose after this debate and he gained more followers.

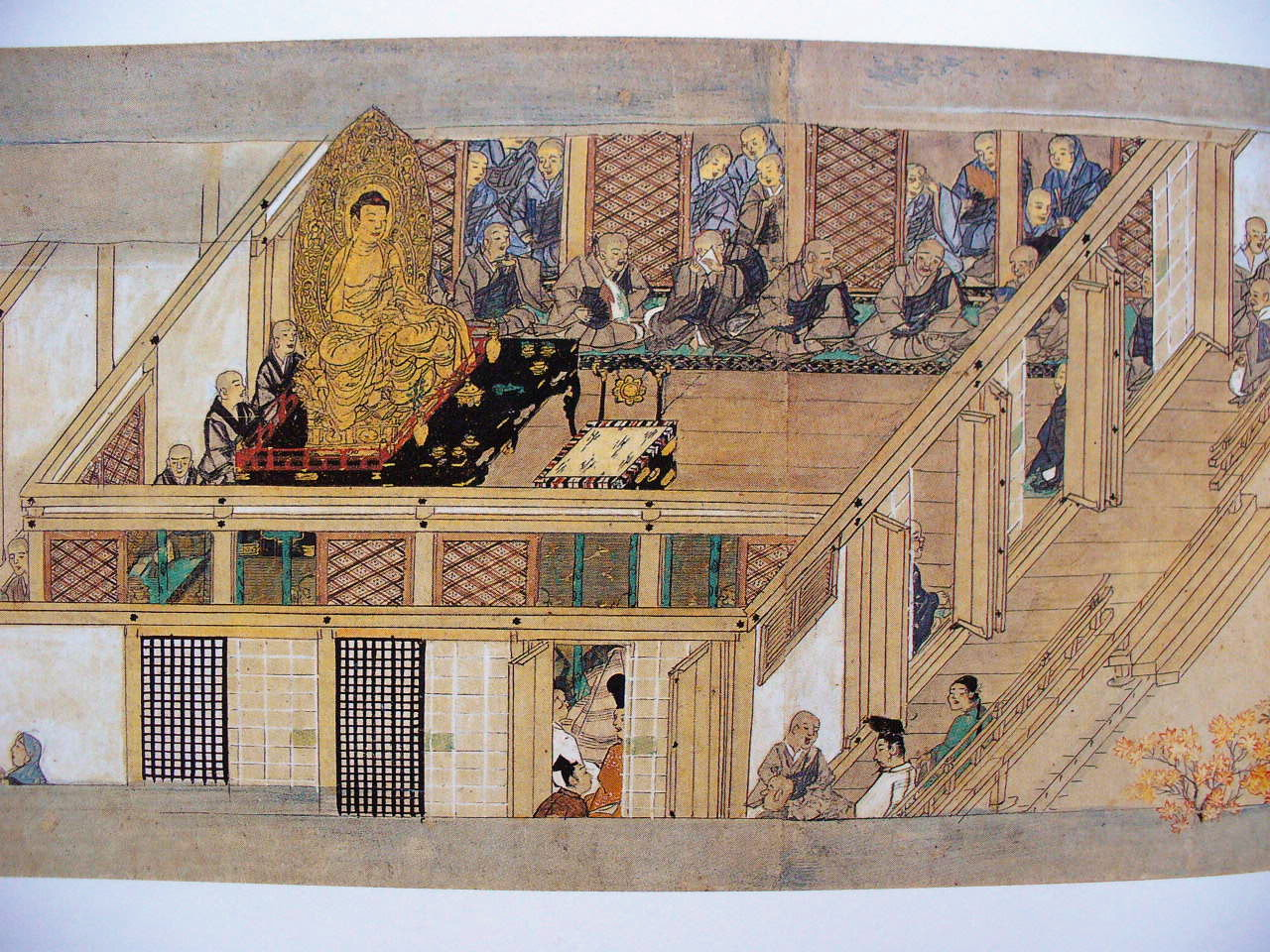
Preparations for the Ohara debate

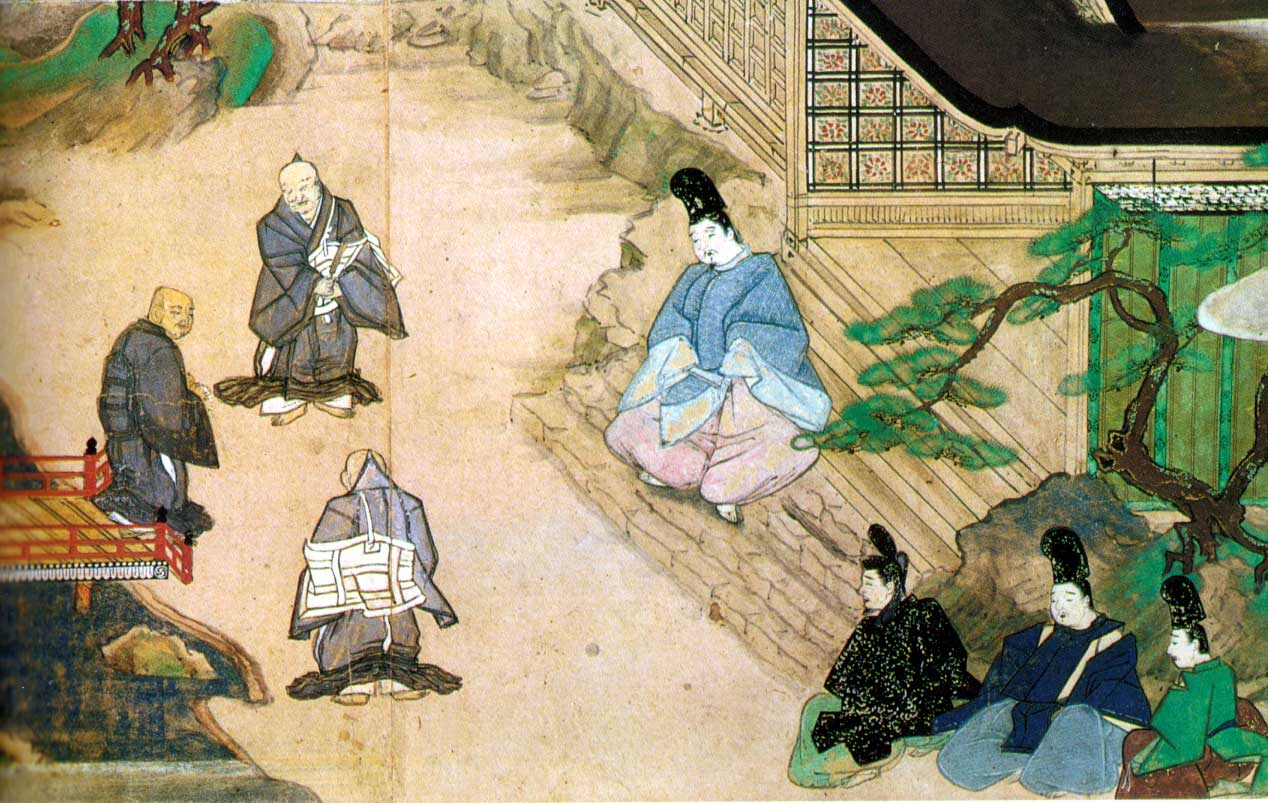
Hōnen meets Kujo Kanezane.

In 1190, Hōnen was granted the great honor of being invited to give a series of lectures on the Pure Land sutras at the national temple of Tōdai-ji in Nara. After these lectures, he became even more popular, giving further lectures in Kyoto, including public talks which drew large crowds. He was also invited to give lectures at the court of the imperial regent (kampaku) Kujō Kanezane (1149–1207), who then became a follower of Hōnen. At the behest of Kanezane, Hōnen reworked his lectures into his magnum opus, the Senchakushū, which outlines his main teachings.

As Hōnen's teaching became popular and spread throughout the nation, some individuals began to interpret his teachings in more radical and unexpected ways, including forms of antinomianism and criticisms of other traditions. In 1204, the Tendai monks at Mount Hiei implored the head priest of Tendai to ban the teachings of exclusive nembutsu and to banish any adherents from their principality.

In 1205 the temple of Kōfuku-ji, located in Nara, implored Emperor Go-Toba to sanction Hōnen and his followers. The temple provided the Emperor with nine charges alleging unappeasable differences with the so-called eight schools. Hōnen's detractors cited examples of his followers, such as Gyoku and Kōsai, who supposedly committed vandalism against Buddhist temples, intentionally broke the Buddhist precepts, or caused others to intentionally turn away from established Buddhist teachings.

Richard Bowring condenses these charges into two general forms. First is the nature of a single practice. Hōnen's emphasis on the single practice of nembutsu denied the usefulness of all other Buddhist practices. The sole emphasis on Amitābha was also coupled with discouraging the traditional worship of the kami. The second charge was that Hōnen placed the most lowly layperson on equal footing with the wisest monk, rendering the entire monastic establishment as useless.

In response, Hōnen and his followers agreed to sign the Shichikajō-kishōmon (七箇条起請文, "Seven Article Pledge"), which called for restraint in moral conduct and in interactions with other Buddhist sects, promising not to criticize or insult the teachings of other sects.

=== Exile and the final years ===
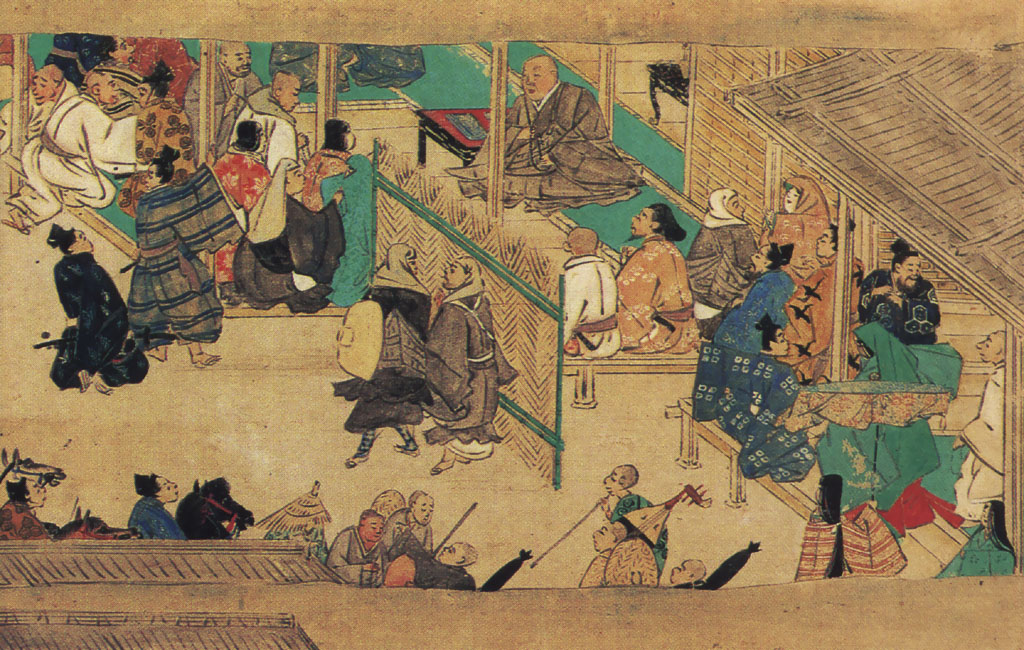
Honen's public preaching

The clamour surrounding Hōnen's teachings dissipated for a time until 1207, though the monks of other sects continued to critique his teaching. In this year, regent Kanezane died, and then Emperor Go-Toba implemented a ban against exclusive nembutsu. This ban was sparked by an incident where two of Hōnen's most prominent followers held a nembutsu retreat which was attended by various figures, including two court ladies. Hōnen's disciples were accused of using nembutsu practice as a coverup for sexual liaisons. As part of the ban, Hōnen (now eighty) and some of his disciples, including Benchoō and Shinran, were exiled to Shikoku, while four disciples were executed. This is known as the Jogen Persecution (承元の法難, jōgen no hōnan) of 1207. Hōnen is said to have responded:

I have labored here in the capital these many years for the spread of the Nembutsu, and so I have long wished to get away into the country to preach to those on field and plain, but the time never came for the fulfillment of my wish. Now, however, by the august favor of His Majesty, circumstances have combined to enable me to do so.

While Hōnen and some key disciples were exiled to Tosa province, his movement in Kyoto remained strong. While in exile, Hōnen spread the teachings to the people he met - fishermen, prostitutes, and the peasantry. The emperor soon rescinded the exile however, though Hōnen only returned to Kyoto in 1211. In 1212, the following year, Hōnen died in Kyoto, but was able to compose the One-Sheet Document (一枚起請文, Ichimai-kishōmon) a few days before he died.

=== Character ===
The Japanese Jodo Shu Research Institute describes Hōnen's personality as a "strict" but "bold innovator" who was "introspective and self-critical" and "concerned with solving the problems of daily life rather than worrying about doctrinal matters". On the latter point Hōnen expressed unusual concern over the spiritual welfare of women, regardless of social status. As a consequence the role of women in the Jōdo-shū sects has often been greater than in some other Japanese Buddhist traditions.

Hōnen is also known to have been skilled in attaining nembutsu samadhi and the visions that often comes with it. He is also said to have had various visions in dreams, including a well recorded vision of Shandao. His visions are recorded in a work called Sammai Hottoku Ki (A Record of Receiving Samadhic Revelation), recorded by Genchi.

About himself Hōnen reportedly said:

[I lack] the wisdom to teach others. Ku Amida Butsu of Hosshō-ji, though less intelligent, contributes in leading the people to the Pure Land as an advocate of the nembutsu. After death, if I could be born in the world of humans, I would like to be born a very ignorant man and to diligently practice the nembutsu. (Tsuneni Oserarekeru Okotoba - Common Sayings of Hōnen)

== Works ==
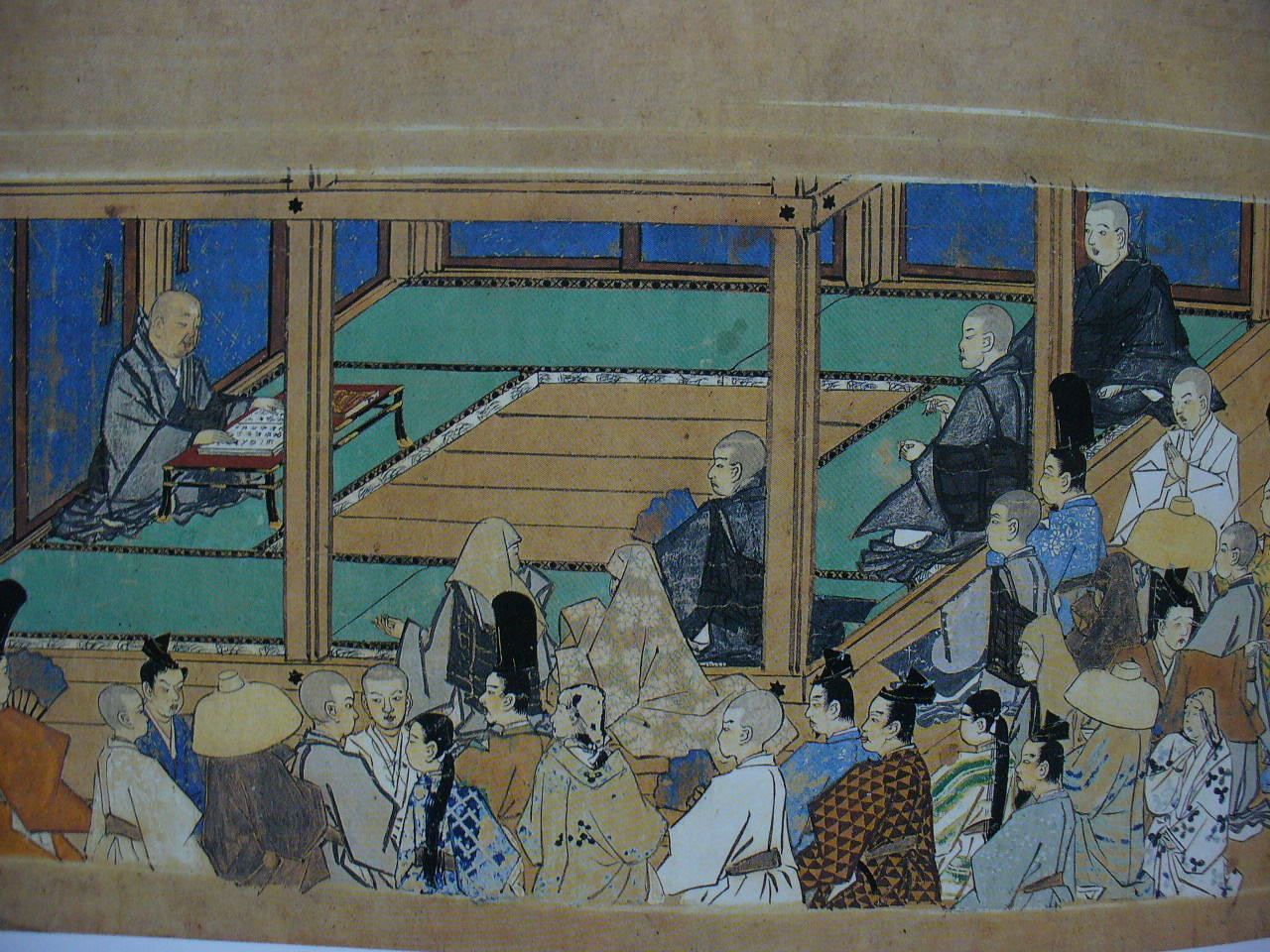
Hōnen teaching

=== Senchakushū ===
Hōnen's main work expounding his Pure Land doctrine is the Senchaku Hongan Nenbutsushū (選択本願念仏集, Collection of Selections on Nenbutsu and the Original Vow; Senchakushū for short), written in 1198 at the request of his patron Lord Kujō Kanezane (1148–1207). The document was not widely distributed by Hōnen's request until after his death. However, it was copied and distributed among Hōnen's close disciples, including by Shinran, who made his own copy.

When Hōnen was exiled in 1207, his disciples in Kyoto worked to have the text printed (using traditional woodblock printing). The carving of the blocks was completed in 1211 and the first copied were then printed and distributed publicly. This was the first printing of the text of a Japanese Buddhist author and it caused another uproar among other Buddhist schools. In 1227, the monks of the Tendai school attacked the print shop, and destroy the printing blocks. In 1239, Hōnen's followers then re-carved the blocks so they could reprint the text again.

=== Other ===
Another key document from Hōnen is his last testament, the One-Sheet Document (一枚起請文, Ichimai-kishōmon), which is a short encapsulation of this basic teaching and is often recited in services today.

Most of Hōnen's teachings and writings (which were not published in his lifetime) were collected by his disciples after his death into four main collections. They include writings in classical Chinese and in Japanese. The collections are:

- The Collected Teachings of Kurodani-shōnin ("Eminent monk of Kurodani"): The Chinese Anthology (ten fascicles)
- The Collected Teachings of Kurodani-shōnin: The Japanese Anthology (five fascicles)
- The Supplement to the Collected Teachings of Kurodani-shōnin: The Chinese Anthology (one fascicle)
- The Supplement to the Collected Teachings of Kurodani-shōnin: The Japanese Anthology (two fascicles)

There are also other works attributed to Hōnen that as not part of these traditional collections. Scholars debate the authenticity of these secondary works. One example is the Biography of Honen Shonin (Honen Shonin denki, also called Daigo-bon for short) discovered at Daigo-ji temple in 1917. This work contains numerous texts attributed to Hōnen which were written or directly transcribed by Hōnen's disciple Seikan-bo Genchi.

== Teaching ==
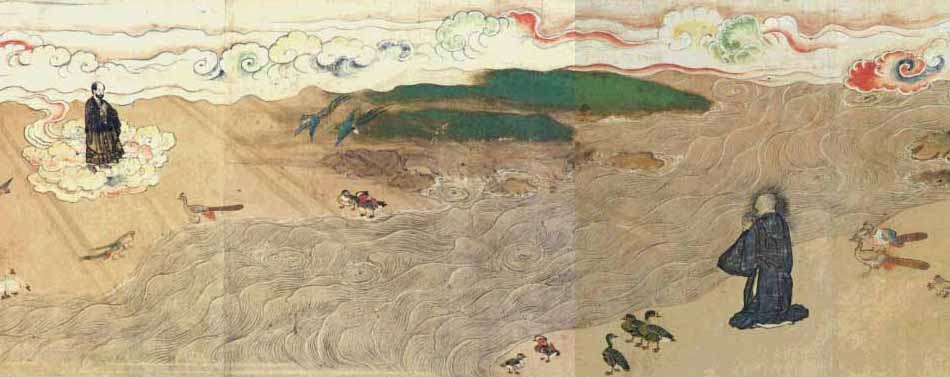
A depiction of Hōnen's dream vision of master Shandao

The teachings of Hōnen are informed primarily by the Chinese Pure Land Buddhism, especially the work of key Chinese Pure Land masters like Tanluan, Daochuo, Shandao and Huaigan. Hōnen himself lists these figures as Pure Land patriarchs in his Jōdo goso den. Hōnen was also influenced by the Tendai school background in which he trained as a monk. The work of Genshin was also important for Hōnen, as he was a Japanese Tendai monk who focused on Pure Land practice.

Out of all of these, Shandao is clearly the central figure for Hōnen, who writes in his Senchakushū: "Shandao's Commentary on the Meditation Sutra is the guidebook to the Western Pure Land. It should be regarded as the eyes and feet of nembutsu devotees." Hōnen goes even further than this, writing once again in the Senchakushū that "Shandao was a manifestation of Amida...his written works are Amida Buddha's direct preaching. If one desires to copy his Commentary on the Meditation Sutra, it should be done according to the method prescribed for copying the Buddhist sutras."

=== Relying on the Buddha's power ===
Hōnen’s teachings present a path designed not for religious elites but for ordinary individuals. His doctrine centers on attaining rebirth in the Pure Land through a personal connection with Amida Buddha and a reliance of his other-power (Jp: tariki). In contrast to the traditional Buddhist emphasis on achieving nirvana through individual effort or "self-power" (Jp: jiriki), Hōnen focuses on reciting Amida’s name (nembutsu), a simple faith based practice that offers liberation to all types of people.

The basic premise behind Hōnen's teaching is an existential honesty and humility regarding our limitations to reach Buddhahood. For Hōnen, most, if not all people, cannot attain awakening through the Mahayana practices based on effort (the perfections, meditation, etc). This is because most people are deluded and fallible "bombus" (common foolish people filled with defilements). Hōnen certainly believed that about himself, even though he had spent years in monastic training. Since ordinary people lack the ability to liberate themselves, their only other option is to have faith in the salvific power of the Buddha Amitabha. Thus Hōnen argued that we should turn to the easy practice of nembutsu (the faithful recitation of the Buddha's name in the phrase: Namo Amida Butsu, "Homage to Amida Buddha") and completely rely on the power of the Buddha to liberate us from this world into the Pure Land after death.

This attitude of reliance on other-power also serves to dissolve our attachments to our sense of self and its capacities. This is something which Hōnen believed was found in all those who practice the paths which rely on self-power and individual effort. Apart from this, Hōnen also believed that the practice which relies on nembutsu and the Buddha's power was even more important in his current era. This is because he believed that the world had entered the age of Dharma decline (Jp: mappo) in which traditional self-power methods were no longer effective for most people.

=== Nembutsu ===
Hōnen's teachings on the nembutsu are briefly summarized in his final work, the One-Sheet Document, in which Hōnen also states that he has "no other teaching than this". This short text containing the core of Hōnen's teaching states that the nembutsu is not a kind of meditation, nor does it require studying or understanding. Instead:

There is no other reason or cause by which we can utterly believe in attaining birth in the Pure Land than the nembutsu itself. Reciting the nembutsu and believing in birth in the Pure Land naturally gives rise to the three minds (sanjin) and the four modes of practice (shishu). If I am withholding any deeper knowledge beyond simple recitation of the nembutsu, then may I lose sight of the compassion of Shakyamuni and Amida Buddha and slip through the embrace of Amida's original vow. Even if those who believe in the nembutsu deeply study all the teachings which Shakyamuni taught during his life, they should not put on any airs and should practice the nembutsu with the sincerity of those untrained followers ignorant of Buddhist doctrines.

For Hōnen, the nembutsu is a gift by Amida Buddha which has the power to establish a karmic relationship between the devotee and the Buddha and his Pure Land. Hōnen believed that the nembutsu was "chosen" or "selected" (Jp: senchaku) by the Buddha himself as the primary practice, infusing it with all his power and merit. Furthermore, for Hōnen, the nembutsu is really the Buddha himself in sonic form, and thus to say the nembutsu and hear it is to manifest and experience a nirmāṇakāya of the Buddha Amida.

=== The "selection" of the nembutsu ===
Hōnen's teaching focuses on the nembutsu as the practice chosen by Amida Buddha, the "selected nenbutsu of the original vow" (senchaku hongan nenbutsu), seeing it as the central and most important Buddhist practice. The reason that the Buddha chose this practice and infused it with his power is that the compassion of the Buddha is so great that he wishes all beings to succeed. Therefore, he will promote the practice that is easiest and most accessible for the greatest number of beings.

Hōnen writes in the Senchakushū that since the nembutsu is easy to practice in comparison to other Buddhist practices, it is the most universal practice taught by the Buddha, whose compassion seeks the soteriological "equality" (byōdō) of birth in the Pure Land for all people. Furthermore, he writes:

Because the nenbutsu is easy [to practice], it is open to all [people]. Because the manifold practices are difficult [to master], they are not open to the diverse [human] capacities. However, was it not [the aim of Amida's] Fundamental Vow (hongan) to abandon the difficult and take up the easy [practices] in order to enable all sentient beings to attain birth in equality? If the Fundamental Vow required to make Buddha images or to build stupas, poor and destitute [people] certainly would have to give up hope for birth. However, the rich and noble people are few and the poor and low people are extremely numerous. If the Fundamental Vow required wisdom and high intelligence, the foolish and dull certainly would have to give up hope for birth... If the Fundamental Vow would have required the various practices [mentioned] above, the people being able to attain birth would be few and those not attaining birth would be numerous. However, Amida Nyorai, when long ago he was the monk Dharmākara, being moved by compassion of equality in order to grasp all [people] comprehensively, did not make the Fundamental Vow for birth by requiring the various practices such as making Buddha statues or building stupas. He made the Fundamental Vow requiring only the one practice of reciting the nenbutsu.

Thus, the main reason that the Buddha chose the nembutsu as the supreme practice was that the vast majority of people are poor, uneducated, defiled, unwise and forced by circumstances to violate the precepts (for example, for fishermen and so on). If liberation depended solely on difficult and time consuming practices, most would not be liberated. Therefore, Amida Buddha compassionately chose to make birth in his Pure Land contingent on the most accessible practice, making liberation truly open for all beings. This revolutionary idea goes against the traditional assumption that the Buddha's most important and effective practices were the most complex and difficult ones to put into practice (i.e. the most elite practices).

While other schools of Buddhism organized their doctrinal classifications based on which sutra or teaching they believed was the most profound, Hōnen focused on the universal ease and accessibility of the nembutsu as the criterion for it being the highest practice. Since the nembutsu was effective for all kinds of people and in all ages (even in the current age of Dharma decline), Hōnen argued that it was the supreme teaching of the Buddha. However, Hōnen still believed that the nembutsu was not only the most accessible practice, but that it was also the superior practice and the most effective. This is because, for Hōnen, the nembutsu contained within it Amitabha Buddha's power, bodhicitta (mind of awakening), and all of his merits and enlightenment, as well as the entire Buddhist teaching (the Three Truths).

=== Equality ===
Hōnen taught that all people could attain birth in the Pure Land through nembutsu, where they could become Buddhas easily by learning directly from the Buddha Amitabha. This included all women, the uneducated lower classes and even the most evil people who had committed the worst deeds. This universality and inclusiveness made his teachings extremely popular among all classes of people. According to Hōnen, this was all possible through the Buddha's power and "great compassion of equality" (byōdō no daihi) which embraces and accommodates all human capabilities and conditions. Hōnen partially derived his views on the equality of all people in the nembutsu from Shandao, who writes in his commentary that "the essence of [Amida] Buddha’s mind is compassion, and with this great compassion of equality he grasps all [sentient beings] universally."

Hōnen met all sorts of people in his life including fishermen, prostitutes and samurai, and he recommended nembutsu to all of them. He taught that even if they could not stop acting in immoral ways now, the nembutsu would ensure their birth in the Pure Land. For example, Hōnen replied to a prostitute that if she could not give up her current work, "then keep reciting nembutsu just as you are... In fact, women like you are the most welcome guests of Amida’s Vow." Hōnen was also particularly concerned with religious discrimination against women, who were not allowed in numerous holy mountains or temples, and were limited by various taboos around childbirth and menstruation. For Hōnen, when it came to birth in the Pure Land, women were just as capable as men, and traditional taboos did not matter.

According to Hōnen, what really mattered was saying nembutsu with faith. One's status as a priest, monk, ascetic, or noble being did not matter much. When it came to practice, he emphasized simple and easy actions that all classes could perform, and de-emphasized expensive and lavish ceremonies and offerings. Regarding religious institutions, he also promoted the idea that laypeople and ordained monks were equal in the practice of nembutsu. Thus, he writes "the merits of a holy man’s nenbutsu and the worldly person’s nenbutsu are the same; there is no difference whatsoever." This indicates the radically universal and egalitarian nature of Hōnen's teaching, which threatened the influence and power of the other schools and the basic idea of the monastic and priestly hierarchy.

Furthermore, if laypersons were said to have just as much potential to attain the Pure Land and thus Buddhahood, then the status and authority of monks as mediators of Buddhism for laypersons would become much less important. The empowerment of laypersons as agents of their own liberation can be seen in a letter of Hōnen which recommends that the recipient (who asked about the importance of a spiritual advisor) should: "abandon the thought [wish] for an ordinary person as spiritual advisor and rely on Buddha as spiritual guide." For Hōnen, the power of the nembutsu also extended to supernatural protection from spirits (yōkai), kami and demons. This apotropaic power had previously been granted only to religious specialists like Shinto priests, Onmyōdō specialists and Buddhist monks, but now, Hōnen had given it to all people who would recite the nembutsu. According to Martin Repp, all of this entailed a clear "decisive shift" from the traditional view that laypersons require the guidance and mediation of a religious professional to the "new approach of direct agency by an ordinary religious individual". This threat to their power is part of the reason that many monastic elites, who relied on the support of the populace to maintain their powerful monastic complexes and land holdings, opposed Hōnen's teaching fiercely.

Hōnen's soteriological egalitarianism even extended to the Pure Land itself. He de-emphasized the doctrine of the nine classes of birth, which held that more virtuous people would be born in higher levels of the Pure Land and evil people in the lowest ones. Hōnen saw this teaching as a skillful means which helped prevent laziness and immorality among people, but was not ultimately true. He argued that once birth in the Pure Land was attained, beings would experience "birth in equality" (byōdō ni ōjō) into a land which had no hierarchy at all.

=== Sincere faith ===
A key element of Hōnen's teaching is that one needed to approach the practice of nembutsu with the right attitude. Hōnen cautioned against the mistaken belief that birth in the Pure Land depends on the sheer number of times one recites the nembutsu or other efforts. Such a view reflects a reliance on self-power (jiriki), which is unsuitable for ordinary beings (bonpu) living in this degenerate age. Instead, Hōnen emphasized that what truly matters is the depth of faith and sincerity in reciting the nembutsu, rather than any other effort on our part. Whether one chants it a hundred, a thousand, or even a million times, the crucial element is the earnestness with which one entrusts oneself to Amida’s compassion. This genuine reliance on Amida’s power leads to the establishment of unwavering faith, ensuring rebirth in the Pure Land.

Hōnen described this essential faith using Shandao's concept of the triple mind (sanjin), which are necessary for attaining birth in the Pure Land. These qualities, also called the mind at peace (anjin) by Hōnen, are:

1. The Utterly Sincere Mind (shijōshin) – The wholehearted belief that one will be born in the Pure Land through nembutsu practice, trusting in Amida Buddha’s vow and promise.
2. The Profound Mind (jinshin) – A deep and reflective faith that includes both an understanding of ourselves as bombu (a defiled commoner) and an unshakable trust in Amida's saving power.
3. The Mind That Dedicates Merit and Resolves to Be Born in the Pure Land (ekō hotsuganshin) – The firm resolve to dedicate the accumulated merit of nembutsu recitation toward birth in the Pure Land, with the unwavering conviction that Amida’s vow will ensure this outcome.

=== Constant repetition of nembutsu ===
Regarding the practice of nembutsu, Hōnen recommended extensive and continuous recitation of the nembutsu. He recommended that one may begin with attempting to accumulate ten thousand repetitions per day ("and then go on to twenty, thirty, fifty, sixty or even a hundred thousand"), in order to avoid laziness. Hōnen also wrote that a helpful practice was to perform nembutsu retreats (betsuji nembutsu) once in a while to help us maintain focus and enthusiasm in the nembutsu, a practice recommended by Shandao and Genshin. During these retreats (which traditionally last for seven days), the recitation itself can be undertaken for six or twelve hours at a time. When practicing in a group, participants should take turns to ensure continuous recitation.

Part of the reason that Hōnen recommended constant repetition of the nembutsu seems to be that he believed the nembutsu could eradicate all one's bad karma as well as having the power of making pure karma for one's future birth in the Pure Land and one's future enlightenment. Thus he writes:

lifelong practice [of nenbutsu] means constantly generating pure causation (jōin o nasu) from first arousing the aspiration for enlightenment to [the realization of] enlightenment without ever backsliding.

Of course, this generation of merit was not based on one's self-power, but one the other-power that Amida Buddha had himself imbued into the nembutsu.

Another important reason for Hōnen's promotion of extensive repetition of nembutsu was his belief that this practice established a strong devotional bond between the practitioner and Amida Buddha. Thus, chapter 2 of the Senchakushū states: "those who cultivate the right and assisting practices become extremely intimate and familiar with Amida Buddha."

Furthermore, Hōnen also held that the recitation of the nembutsu could lead to a state of samadhi (meditative absorption), just like other forms of Buddhist meditation. This "nembutsu samadhi" was a heightened religious experience in which one may even have a vision of the Buddha and the Pure Land. Hōnen considered this samadhi experience as important for legitimating the authority of a Buddhist teacher.

A major dispute arose among Hōnen's followers over two positions: once-calling (Jp: ichinen-gi) and many-calling (Jp: tanen-gi). Once calling held that since you only needed to recite nenbutsu once to be liberated there was no need to accumulate many recitations, while many-calling held that you needed to recite nenbutsu as much as possible (tens of thousands of times a day even). Hōnen promoted sustained practice as taught by many-calling, though he also said that one could be saved by even a few recitations (but this was not an excuse to abandon practice). Thus, Hōnen gave the following advice on the nembutsu regarding this issue:

If, because it is taught that birth is attained with but one or ten utterances, you say the Nembutsu heedlessly, then faith is hindering practice. If, because it is taught that you should say the Name without abandoning it from moment to moment, you believe one or ten utterances to be indecisive, then practice is hindering faith. As your faith, accept that birth is attained with a single utterance; as your practice, endeavor in the Nembutsu throughout life.

=== Other practices ===
Since the nembutsu is the chosen practice, the "Rightly Established Practice" (shojo no go), all other practices were seen by Hōnen as merely supportive or secondary. For Hōnen if one wanted to attain birth in the Pure Land, one only needed to recite the name of Amitabha with faith. Hōnen taught that meditation, study, keeping precepts, or other practices were not necessary and that nembutsu should be one's priority. Through nembutsu (even just a few recitations), Hōnen believed that even the most unethical people would be born in the Pure Land. Thus, Hōnen writes:

When I consider these matters carefully, I wish to urge that anyone who desires to quickly escape from the cycle of birth-and-death should, of the two types of the excellent teaching, temporarily cease the practices of the Holy Path and select the practices of the Pure Land. (T. 2608, 83:18c-19a)

Because of his reliance on a single simple practice, Hōnen's teaching was widely criticized as "exclusive" and as neglecting basic Buddhist ethics and bodhicitta.

However, Hōnen still practiced meditative nembutsu, kept the bodhisattva precepts, shunned meat and alcohol, and continued to perform rituals, monastic ordinations and study texts. Thus, even if Hōnen saw other practices as unnecessary, he did not teach that one should completely abandon them, since they could still support one's nenbutsu practice. For example, keeping the precepts was important since it was a way to prevent the accumulation of bad karma, which could become a hindrance to one's practice.

The Senchakushū gives three main reasons for why the Buddha taught numerous other practices in the sutras aside from the nembutsu: (1) the myriad practices were taught so beings would set them aside and take refuge in the nembutsu; (2) they were taught to guide beings to the nembutsu; (3) they were taught to explain the two paths fully (path of sages and easy path).

For Hōnen, one's relationship with other practices was defined by one's relationship with the nembutsu and one's faith. He held that at first, one needed to make a choice to focus exclusively on the nembutsu (Amida's chosen practice) and set aside all other practices. Once one had become firmly and faithfully established in this practice however, one could reintroduce other auxiliary (jogo) Pure Land practices (such as bodhicitta, and the other five main practices as defined by Shandao) to support one's nembutsu practice. Hōnen clearly states this in Chapter 12 of the Senchakushū, where he accepts that any of the thirteen contemplations taught in the Contemplation Sutra and all of the elements of the three pure acts (including the precepts), can contribute to birth in the Pure Land.

Furthermore, once one had attained firm faith, other "different good practices helpful to the nembutsu" (irui no jogo) may also be resumed as well. What distinguished these secondary practices at this stage was not their content (they remain the same practices), but whether one had attained the Firm Establishment of Faith (ketsujo ojoshin), i.e. the triple mind or the peaceful mind (anjin). This is because, once one has firm faith in the Buddha's power and the nembutsu, one's attitude towards the secondary practices changes. That is to say, one stops viewing them through the lens of self-power and so one can resume them as aids to the nembutsu.

This relationship between the nembutsu and the secondary practices is described by Hōnen as follows:

If one has the heart of the nembutsu then going about daily activities, engaging in various other practices like making offerings or meditating, and getting involved in social welfare activities is something one should do. However, if these activities become the center of one's life and the nembutsu auxiliary, then one should re-prioritize one's life. (Tsuneni osei rarekeru okotoba, SHZ., 493)

Thus, the process of "selecting" (senchaku) the nembutsu and setting aside other practices is not one of total and permanent exclusivity, but instead includes the later re-appropriation of the secondary practices once one has attained true faith. At this stage of re-appropriation, the auxiliary and miscellaneous practices are seen not just as mere aids, but as expressions of the nembutsu (which contains all practices). This helps explain why Hōnen continued to perform many other practices alongside the nembutsu throughout his life.

=== Amida and the Pure Land ===
Hōnen also taught that there were kinds of relationship between Amida and sentient beings:

- intimate karmic relations (shin-en): This refers to how Amida calls out to all sentient beings and how Amida listens and perceives to those who say the nembutsu.
- close karmic relations (gen-in): This refers to how, when sentient beings desire to see the Buddha, Amida will respond to this desire and appear to them
- superior karmic relations (zojo-en): This refers to how those who recite the nembutsu are purified of all their bad karma. Then, at their death, Amida and his assembly of bodhisattvas will arrive to welcome them to the Pure Land.

Hōnen’s conception of the Pure Land closely aligns with that of Shandao and is characterized by three key aspects. First, he believed that the Pure Land was established through the power of Amida, with the fundamental purpose of saving all deluded beings. Second, Hōnen emphasized how, even if individuals enter the Pure Land while still filled with defilements, these will be eliminated upon arrival through Amida's grace. Third, Hōnen maintained that the Pure Land was a real realm with divine forms and characteristics. Recognizing that ordinary beings tend to perceive reality in concrete terms and cling to form, Amida Buddha meets them where they are, and leads them to a Pure Land filled with beautiful forms. In this way, Hōnen rejected the notions of a purely symbolic or psychological view of the Pure Land.

== Influence ==
Hōnen had a profound influence on later Buddhist figures both within Pure Land traditions and beyond. His advocacy of a single chosen practice based on Shandao's Pure Land Buddhism marked a significant departure from the more complex practices of the Tendai and Shingon schools toward a more devotional and accessible practice. As noted by scholars like James Foard, Hōnen’s devotional movement eliminated the need for the mediation of a priestly class and made complete Buddhahood easily available to all laypersons. This emphasis on a single accessible practice would become the hallmark of other popular "New Kamakura schools" of Japanese Buddhism, including Dōgen's Sōtō school and Nichiren's Lotus Sutra tradition.

Hōnen's emphasis on faith and practice over scholasticism laid the foundation for later developments in Japanese Pure Land thought and made Pure Land a very appealing form of Buddhism among the masses, one which would eventually overtake the other schools of Japanese Buddhism in popularity in later periods. Hōnen is considered the founder of the Jōdo-shū school. However, during Hōnen's life, Jōdo-shū was never separated from the Tendai establishment, and was really only a faction (ha) or sub-sect of the Tendai school. After the 14th century however, this faction became a truly independent tradition.

Among his most direct successors was Shinran (1173–1263), the founder of Jōdo Shinshū (True Pure Land School), who emphasized absolute reliance on Amida’s grace, rejecting the necessity of repeated nembutsu recitation as a self-powered practice. Ippen (1239–1289), another Pure Land reformer, took Hōnen’s teachings in a different direction, promoting ecstatic recitation and proselytizing through the Ji-shū movement. Even within other schools like Shingon, Kegon, Hosso and Tendai, Hōnen’s legacy and the popularity of the nembutsu contributed to ongoing debates about practice, faith, nembutsu and the Pure Land (often serving as a key opponent to define their orthodoxy). This reflects his enduring impact on Japanese Buddhism as a whole.

Hōnen’s influence can be seen in the ideas of numerous later figures of these traditions, including:

- numerous monks of the Shinsei branch of Tendai, including Hōdō (who promoted recitative nembutsu),
- the Kegon monk Gyōnen who wrote a history of Pure Land Buddhism in Japan focusing on Hōnen's lineage, the Jōdo Hōmon Genrushō.
- The Shingon monks Jōhen and Dōhan who taught an esoteric form of nembutsu.

Hōnen's influence extended into secular culture as well, as can be seen from his appearance in numerous works of Japanese literature such as Tale of the Heike, Mirror of the East (Azuma kagami), and Essays in Idleness (Tsurezuregusa).

=== Disciples ===
By 1204 Hōnen had a group of disciples numbering around 190. This number is derived from the number of signatures found on Shichikajō-kishōmon (七箇条起請文, Seven Article Pledge), a guideline for rules of conduct in the Jōdo-shū community to assuage concerns by other groups. Some of his most important disciples include:

- Benchō (1162–1238), founder of the Chinzei branch of Jōdo-shū, one of the largest and most influential branches of the school. Often called Shōkō, he was one of the monks exiled in 1207 to Chinzei, Kyushu and was a supporter of the tanen-gi (many calling) position.
- Genchi (1183–1238), Hōnen's personal attendant, and close friend of Benchō.
- Shōkū (1147–1247), founder of the Seizan (West Mountain) branch of Jōdo-shū, another one of the larger and most influential branches. He was not exiled like other disciples and was able to continue to establish the Pure Land school in the Kyoto area.
- Kōsai (1163–1247), promoted a version of the controversial "single-recitation" (ichinen-gi) teaching of Jōdo-shū. Chinzei-ha sources claim that he was expelled from Hōnen's community by Hōnen. But it's likely these claims are later sectarian fabrications of the Chinzei sect, since earlier sources from other traditions do not mention this.
- Hōhombō Gyōkū, another proponent of ichinen-gi doctrine. Exiled to Sado in 1207.
- Shinran (1173–1263), founder of the Jōdo Shinshū branch of Pure Land Buddhism. He also supported the idea that one single recitation could lead to birth in the Pure Land as long as one had shinjin (true faith). He was exiled to Echigo Province in 1207.
- Ryūkan (1148–1227), who taught that many-calling and once-calling were both true.
- Seikaku (1165-1235), author of Notes on Faith Alone (Yuishinshō)
- Chōsai (1184–1266), founder of the Shōgyōhongangi branch of Jōdo-shū which believed that all Buddhist practices can lead to rebirth in the Pure Land.
- Rensei (1141–1208), formerly a notable samurai named Kumagai no Jirō Naozane who had fought at the Battle of Ichi-no-Tani and killed the Heike leader Taira no Atsumori.

A number of disciples went on to establish branches of Pure Land Buddhism, based on their interpretations of Hōnen's teachings.

=== Criticisms ===
Hōnen faced many fierce criticisms from various quarters. Tendai and Shingon monks accused Hōnen of dismissing traditional Buddhist practices such as the precepts, esoteric rituals, and scholarly study. His emphasis on nembutsu was seen as overly simplistic and as a rejection of the broader Buddhist path, including a rejection of bodhicitta, the foundation of Mahayana Buddhism. Critics also argued that Hōnen’s teaching of salvation through nembutsu alone might lead to moral laxity and some feared that laypeople and monks alike would neglect proper conduct.

In response these concerns, Hōnen clarified in various writings, including the Seven Point Pledge (Shichikajō seikai) he and his students signed together, that he did not reject morality and other Buddhist practices, even if his teaching entailed a focus on the nembutsu. Hōnen also explicitly rejected a misinterpretation of his teaching called "encouragement of evil conduct" (zōaku muge), which was the idea that one can abandon and violate the Buddhist precepts without concern, since Amida will save us anyways. He also told all his followers not to criticize the practices of other schools. Indeed, even though Hōnen believed that the nembutsu was the most effective way to attain Buddhahood, he did not believe that other practices were useless. He held that they could possibly also lead to liberation for some, but that this was not certain, unlike the nembutsu.

In spite of all this, numerous figures wrote texts critiquing Hōnen's teaching, including Myōe who wrote Zaijarin (Breaking the Circle of Heresy), and Jōkei, the monk who also authored the Kofuku-ji petition to ban Hōnen's teaching. Dōgen, the founder of Sōtō Zen, likewise criticized Hōnen's teaching as "completely wrong", claiming that repetition of the nembutsu was "worthless-like a frog in a spring field croaking night and day." Myōe's most forceful criticism was that Hōnen’s teaching abandoned the generation of bodhicitta (the mind aimed at awakening for the sake of all beings), which is the foundation of all Mahayana Buddhism. While Hōnen did not ignore bodhicitta in his works, he seems to have held that it was not possible to generate it through self-power, and so one should focus on nembutsu first. In response to these critiques, Hōnen’s students also offered their rebuttals and wrote various responses. Perhaps the most famous of these is Shinran's Kyōgyōshinshō, which has been considered a kind of rebuttal to Myōe's critiques and affirmed that the true faith (shinjin) in Amida was none other than bodhicitta.

Some figures even slandered Hōnen. For example, Jien, the Tendai Abbot of Mount Hiei, claimed that Hōnen suffered from demonic possession. Likewise, Nichiren claimed that Hōnen's nembutsu teaching would lead people to hell in his Treatise on Nembutsu and Eternal Hell (Nembutsu muken jigoku sho). Myōe wrote that since Hōnen abandoned bodhicitta, he "was despicable, no better than a sentient rock, a priest who is no longer Buddhist, the devil’s messenger."

Hōnen’s doctrine also led to social and political concerns among rival schools. By asserting that all people, regardless of social status or religious training, could attain salvation simply through nembutsu, his teachings undermined the social support and authority of both the Buddhist monastic establishment and the ruling elites who patronized traditional schools. This, as well as a groundswell of conversions from older schools to the nembutsu school, is why there was such a strong political opposition to Hōnen’s Pure Land movement.
