= Fujiwara no Kanezane =

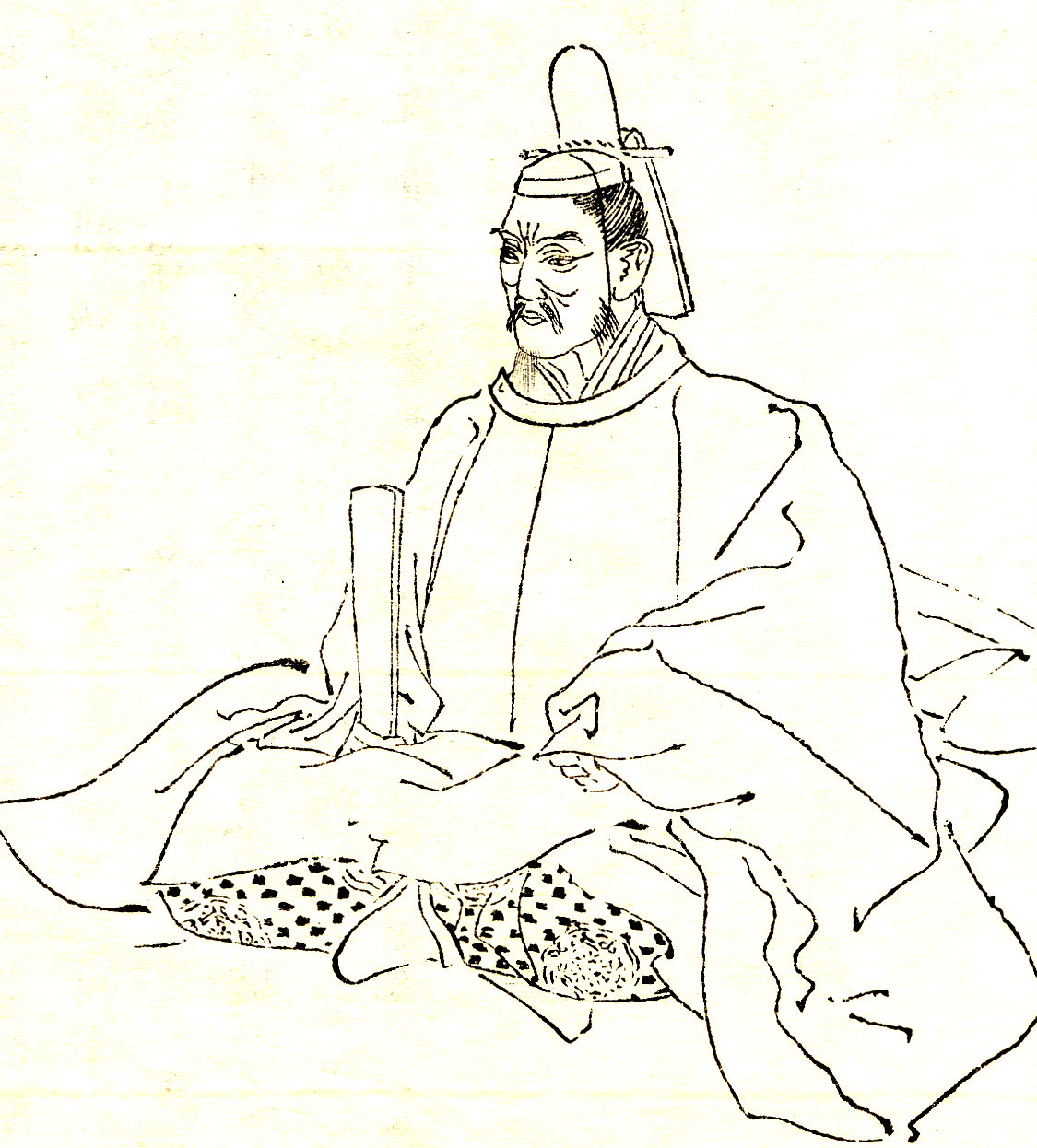
Fujiwara no Kanezane by Kikuchi Yōsai

Fujiwara no Kanezane (藤原 兼実; 1149 – May 3, 1207), also known as Kujō Kanezane (九条 兼実), is the founder of the Kujō family (at the encouragement of Minamoto no Yoritomo), although some sources cite Fujiwara no Morosuke (908–960) as its founder.

Kanezane organised the compilation of the Kitano Tenjin Engi, the history of the Kitano Shrine.

In April 1186 he became regent and in 1189 was appointed Chief Minister.

A descendant of Fujiwara no Michinaga's line, he was the son of Fujiwara no Tadamichi, and his brother, Jien was the author of the historical work Gukanshō.

Among his sons were Kujō Yoshimichi (九条 良通; 1167–1188), Kujō Yoshisuke (九条 良輔; 1185–1218), Kujō Yoshihira (九条 良平; 1185–1240) and Yoshitsune.

In 1202 he ordained as a Buddhist monk under Hōnen and took on the Dharma name Enshō (円証).

== Family ==
- Father: Fujiwara no Tadamichi
- Mother: Kaga no Tsubone
- Wives and children:
  - Wife: Fujiwara no Tomoko, Fujiwara no Sueyuki‘s daughter
    - Kujō Yoshimichi (1167–1188)
    - Kujō Yoshitsune
    - Ryoku
    - Empress Dowager Gishūmon-in Fujiwara no Takako (1173–1239) married Emperor Go-Toba
  - Wife: Fujiwara no Akisuke’s daughter
    - Ryoan (1179–1220)
    - Kujō Yoshihira (1184–1240)
    - Ryokai (1185–1243)
  - Wife: Hachijoin-no-tsubone
    - Kujō Yoshisuke (1185–1218)
  - Unknown
    - Ryokai
    - Ryoji
    - Daughter married Shinran
