= Gyōnen =

Gyōnen (凝然; 1240–1321) was a Japanese Buddhist monk of the Kegon school who resided at the temple of Tōdai-ji, Nara in the late Kamakura period. He studied the history of Buddhism in India, China, and Japan, compiling documents on this subject in pursuit of a comprehensive understanding of Japanese Buddhism.

== Biography ==
Gyōnen, also known as Jikan, was born in Iyokuni (present-day Ehime Prefecture).

He received the Bodhisattva Precepts at Mt. Hiei in 1255. At the age of 18, he received the novice precepts and was fully ordained by Enshō (1220–1277) at Tōdai-ji when he was 20. He studied the teachings of a number of traditions of Buddhism including Sanron and Hossō under various masters around Japan before setting into Tōdai-ji, where he remained for most of his life.

== Works in English translation ==
- The Essentials of the Vinaya Tradition: The Collected Teachings of the Tendai Lotus School, translated by Leo M. Pruden (1995).
- The Essentials of the Eight Traditions. Berkeley, Calif.: Numata Center for Buddhist Translation and Research. OCLC 988575765.
- Gyōnen's Transmission of the Buddha Dharma in Three Countries. Green, Ronald S.; Mun, Chanju (2018). translated by Ronald S. Green and Chunju Mun.
- "The Risshū-kōyō: An Annotated Translation," trans. by Leo M. Pruden, Ph. D. thesis, Harvard University 1969.
- The Origins and Development of Pure Land Buddhism: A Study and Translation of Gyōnen's Jōdo Hōmon Genrushō, trans. by Mark Laurence Blum (2004).
