= Putonghua Proficiency Test =

Test of Standard Chinese proficiency for native Chinese speakers

- Simplified Chinese: 普通话水平测试
- Traditional Chinese: 普通話水平測試
Transcriptions
Standard Mandarin
- Hanyu Pinyin: Pǔtōnghuà Shuǐpíng Cèshì

The Putonghua Proficiency Test or Putonghua Shuiping Ceshi (PSC) is an official test of spoken fluency in Standard Chinese (Mandarin) intended for native speakers of Chinese languages. The test was developed in October 1994 by the Ministry of Education of the People's Republic of China, the Institute of Applied Linguistics at Beijing Language and Culture University and the State Administration of Press, Publication, Radio, Film and Television. Specified standards of achievement in the test are required for many jobs in broadcasting, education and government.

== Content ==
The test consists of five sections:

1. Reading 100 monosyllabic words to test pronunciation. (10%)
2. Reading 100 polysyllabic words to test pronunciation. (20%)
3. Reading out the correct form from several choices, to test vocabulary and syntax. (10%)
4. Reading a 400-character passage to test fluency. (30%)
5. Speaking for three minutes on a topic chosen from two supplied by the examiners. (30%)

There are sixty literary selections used in the fourth section of the test, including:

- a selection from Jia Pingwa's 丑石 ('Ugly Rock'), a story about a meteorite which he and the local community had thought of for many years as a worthless ugly rock
- the work of writer Sun Junqing (孙俊卿) of Haiyang, Shandong, who in 1962 wrote about the hope for a better year of farming in 1963 after the Great Chinese Famine.
- "People that Read are Happy People" a piece by Xie Mian included in his 1997 book Eternal Campus (永远的校园) and originally published in the July 19, 1995 edition of the China Reader's Report (中华读书报).
- "Kite Capriccio" (风筝畅想曲) by Li Hengrui (李恒瑞), describing life as a child in 1950s Fengtai County, Anhui.
- "Father's Love" (父亲的爱), a Chinese translation of one of the works of American Erma Bombeck about her stepfather Albert Harris.
- a text about the relationship between the oceans of the Earth and the origin and evolution of life.
- a story about Hu Shih debating the merits of Written vernacular Chinese over Classical Chinese (selection 15).
- a translation of the legend of the construction of Windsor Guildhall by Sir Christopher Wren.
- an inspirational essay about the conditions in New York City schools written by Liu Yong.
- a reflection written by Yan Wenjing on the hope for friendly Sino-Japanese relations describing the author's discovery of Lotus flowers imported from China which had been planted around the portrait of Jianzhen in the Tōshōdai-ji temple in Nara, Nara, Japan.
- a reflection on the beauty of Meiyu Pond (梅雨潭) and waterfall in the Middle Yandang Mountains in Xianyan Subdistrict, Ouhai District, Wenzhou of southeastern Zhejiang province in eastern China by Zhu Ziqing after his visits to the area in 1923.
- a story from the youth of Xu Dishan in which, after the family has grown peanuts for several months, his father Xu Nanying uses an analogy to the peanut to teach a moral lesson to his children.
- a translation (by Ba Jin) of a story about a young sparrow which had fallen from its nest, written by Ivan Turgenev.
- a description of the Mogao Caves in Dunhuang, Jiuquan, Gansu
- a reminiscence on the value of keeping in close contact with friends by Liu Hsia
- a story about the wisdom displayed by Tao Xingzhi in his handling of a misbehaving elementary school student.
- a story from the childhood of famous footballer Pelé growing up in the slums of Rio de Janeiro.
- a reminiscence on the life of Mina Owczyńska, mother of author Romain Gary
- Xia Yan's comparison of things conventionally assumed to be strong and powerful with grass, which he considers more powerful

== Grading ==
Candidates who pass the test are given a Certificate of Putonghua Proficiency Level at levels 1, 2 or 3, each of which is subdivided into grades A and B:

- Level 1-A (97% correct) is required for presenters in national and provincial radio and television.
- Level 1-B (92% correct) is required for Chinese-language teachers in northern China.
- Level 2-A (87% correct) is required for Chinese-language teachers in southern China.
- Level 2-B (80% correct) is required for Chinese teachers teaching other subjects in China than Chinese Language and Literature.
- Level 3-A (70% correct)
- Level 3-B (60% correct) is required for civil service jobs.

By 2010, the test had been taken more than 35 million times. As it requires strict adherence to the phonology of Standard Chinese, including such features as retroflex initials, erhua and the neutral tone, the test gives an advantage to native speakers of the Beijing dialect and closely related varieties over speakers of varieties lacking these features.

== See also ==
- Hanyu Shuiping Kaoshi, for non-native speakers, has a spoken component in addition to written and listening components.
