= Yan Wenjing =

Chinese writer

- Born: Yan Wenjing; October 15, 1915; Wuchang, Hubei, China
- Died: July 20, 2005 (aged 89)
- Education: Hubei Senior High School
- Occupation: Writer

Yan Wenjing (Chinese: 严文井; pinyin: Yán Wénjǐng; October 15, 1915 – July 20, 2005) was a Chinese writer. He was born Yan Wenjin (严文锦) in Wuchang, Hubei province.

== Education and career ==
Yan Wenjing graduated from Hubei Senior High School in 1934. He took his first job in Beijing Library in 1935. He published a collection of his proses in 1937. He continued his study in Multi-political University in 1938.

A reflection written by Yan Wenjing on the hope for friendly Sino-Japanese relations describing the author's discovery of Lotus flowers imported from China which had been planted around the portrait of Jianzhen in the Tōshōdai-ji temple in Nara, Nara, Japan is included as one of the oral assessment passages on the Putonghua Proficiency Test.

== Works ==
- 1943: 《南南和胡子伯伯》
- 1949: 《丁丁的一次奇怪旅行》《小溪流的歌》
- 1950: 《蚯蚓和蜜蜂的故事》
- 1957: 《三只骄傲的小猫》, 《唐小西在下一次开船港》
