= Liangqing (monk) =

Chinese Buddhist monk, abbot of Famen Temple and martyr

Liangqing (良卿法师)
- Title: Abbot

Personal life
- Born: 1896 Yanshi County, Henan, Qing dynasty (today China)
- Died: 12 July 1967 (aged 70–71) Famen Temple, Famen town, Fufeng County, Shaanxi, China
- Occupation: Monk

Religious life
- Religion: Buddhism
- Cause of death: Burns from self-immolation

Liangqing (良卿法师) was a Chinese Buddhist monk and abbot of Famen Temple (Chinese: 法门寺; pinyin: Fǎmén Sì).

At the beginning of the Chinese Cultural Revolution in 1966, a campaign was introduced to destroy the Four Olds. As Buddhist sites and temples were widely targeted during this campaign, Liangqing's Famen Temple was a major target for destruction. Hundreds of Red Guards were sent to destroy the Famen Temple. Due to this imposing threat, Liangqing, the temple's Abbot, chose an act of self-immolation to protect the temple and contents from destruction. Although the contents of the temple were all smashed by the Red Guard, Liangqing's self-sacrifice was successful as the two True Relics of the Buddha (Śarīra), were saved from destruction.

== Biography ==
Liangqing was born in 1896 (in the 12th year of the reign of Guangxu Emperor of the Qing dynasty) in Yangshi, Hunan province. His birth name was Qi Jinrui. His family was poor. He did not receive a full education, as he had to work at the same time to earn a living and support his family.

At the age of 20 he was ordained as a monk at Lingshan Temple. He held several positions at the Temple before being elected abbot. During his tenure, he worked to restore the temple and attract new monks. After a few years, there were more than fifty. He was then elected Principal Abbot.

In 1950, he went to Mount Wutai to make a spiritual retreat alone for 3 years. On his return, in 1953, he was appointed abbot of Famen Temple. Under his leadership, the Temple became increasingly prosperous.

=== Martyrdom of the Cultural Revolution ===
In May 1966, the Cultural Revolution broke out. The Red Guards ransacked the temple for the first time. On July 17, 1967, many Red Guards returned with shovels and picks to dig under the temple's stupa, as it was rumored that a Kuomintang transmitter was hidden there. They began to dig. Liangqing tried to stop them, but they beat him and ordered him to move away. Shortly after, he returned wearing his five-colored Buddhist robe, a symbol worn by the Temple's abbot, shouting:

Before you find the underground where the Buddha's relic is kept, you must first burn my body!

Then he doused himself with gasoline, and set himself on fire in front of them. (Note: According to another version, he piled up firewood logs, sat on them and set them alight in order to self-immolate.) Frightened, they fled.

He was 71 years old at the time of his self-immolation. His ashes were collected by his disciple Zhang Zhenghua and sent to a Temple in Xianyang for safekeeping. They were later transferred to the Tianchi Temple, Mianchi County on Zhongnan Mountains. Unfortunately, in August 1981, after several months of heavy rain, the pagoda was destroyed by a landslide, taking with it the ashes of the monk from the Famen Temple.

=== Tribute ===
In April 1987, an archaeological team from Shaanxi province went to the Famen temple to uncover the underground passage. After methodical excavations, they found Buddha's relics. A museum was created. On 12 July 1997, to commemorate the 30th anniversary of Liangqing's self-immolation, a tower built in his honour was inaugurated within the Famen Temple.
