= Fengtai South railway station =

Railway station in Huainan, Anhui

Fengtai South 凤台南
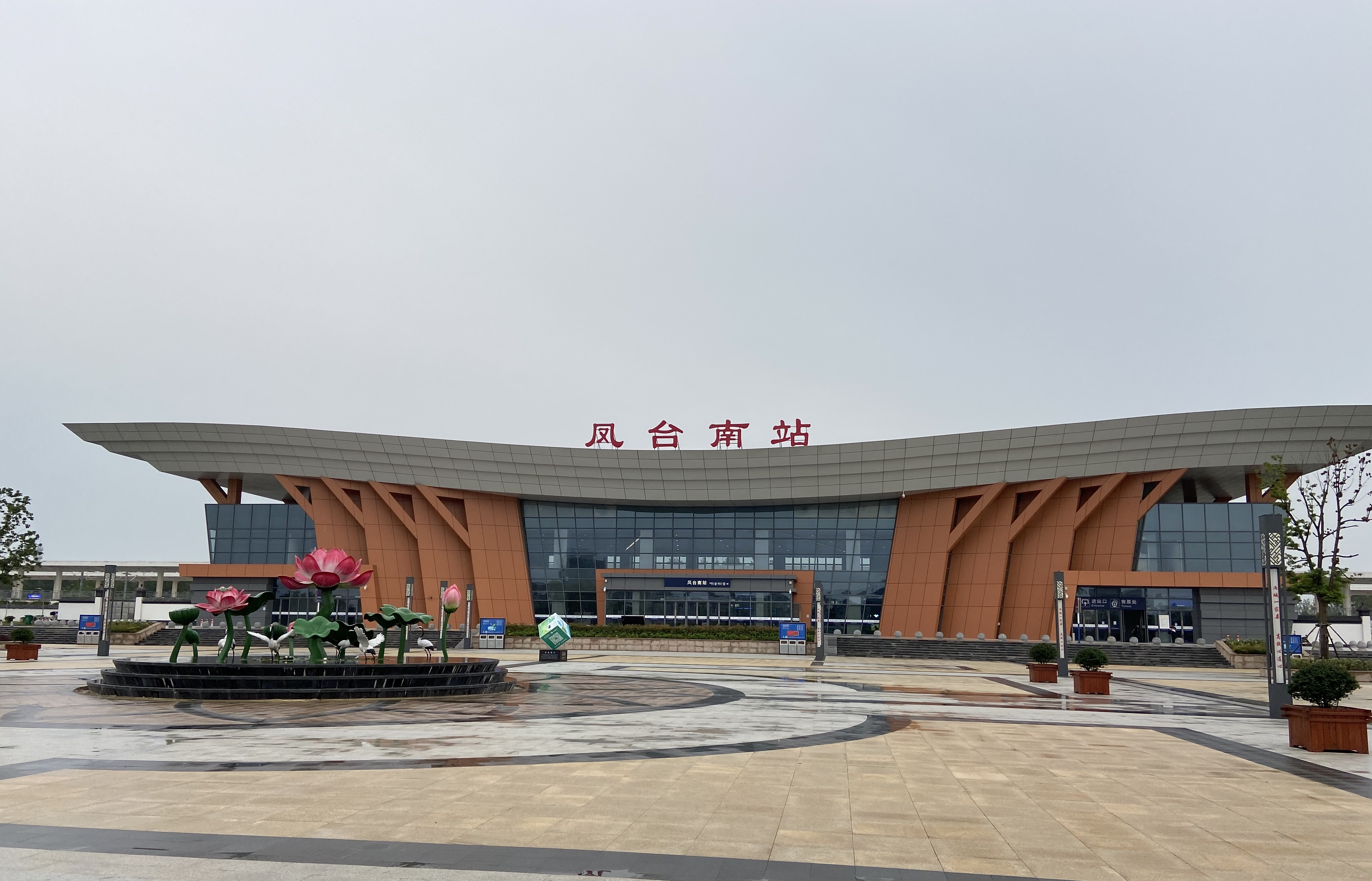

General information
- Location: Fengtai County, Huainan, Anhui; China
- Line: Shangqiu–Hangzhou high-speed railway

History
- Opened: December 1, 2019
Location

Fengtai South railway station (Chinese: 凤台南站) is a railway station on the Shangqiu–Hangzhou high-speed railway in Fengtai County, Huainan, Anhui, China.

Preceding station	China Railway High-speed	Following station
Yingshang North towards Shangqiu	Shangqiu–Hangzhou high-speed railway	Shouxian towards Tonglu
