= Liu Xia =

Liu Xia may refer to:

- Liu Xia (Jin dynasty), Jin official and general
- Liu Hsia (1942–2003), Republic of China writer
- Liu Xia (badminton) (born 1955), Chinese badminton player
- Liu Xia (judoka) (born 1979), Chinese judoka
- Liu Xia (poet) (born 1961), Chinese poet and artist, widow of Liu Xiaobo

== See also ==
- Liuxia Subdistrict (留下街道), a subdistrict in Xihu District, Hangzhou, Zhejiang, China
