= Liu Yong =

Liu Yong may refer to:

- Liu Wei (businessman), also called Liu Yong, businessman executed in 2015
- Liu Yong (Xin dynasty), Han dynasty noble and warlord at the end of the Xin dynasty
- Liu Yong (Three Kingdoms), prince of the Shu Han state in the Three Kingdoms period
- Liu Yong (Song dynasty) (987–1053), Song dynasty poet
- Liu Yong (Qing dynasty) (1719–1805), Qing dynasty official
- Liu Yong (painter) (born 1949), Taiwanese writer, painter, and educator
- Liu Yong (badminton) (born 1975), badminton player
- Ge Fei (author) (Liu Yong, born 1964)
- Tony Liu, Hong Kong and Taiwanese actor
