= Nanto Rokushū =

Six Schools of Nara Buddhism

The Six Schools of Nara Buddhism (六宗, Rokushū) were the principal academic traditions of Buddhism in Japan during the Nara period (710–794). Sometimes called the "Six Southern Schools of Nara" due to the location of their temples in Nara, to the south of the later capital of Heian-kyō, these schools played a central role in the early development of Japanese Buddhist thought.

== Historical Background ==
The Six Schools were introduced from China and Korea in the late 6th and early 7th centuries, during the reign of Prince Shōtoku. They were supported and regulated by the state as part of efforts to strengthen government authority through Buddhist and Confucian doctrine. Government patronage funded the construction of major temples, statues, and artworks, including the Seven Great Temples of Nara.

These schools were primarily scholastic in nature. Their monks engaged in the study and interpretation of complex Buddhist literary works, focusing on questions of mind, existence, and ultimate truth. While some schools emphasized metaphysical doctrines, others concentrated on monastic discipline or temple organization.

As their influence in politics and society grew, these schools became deeply connected with the imperial court. This prominence contributed to Emperor Kanmu’s decision to move the capital to Heian-kyō (Kyoto) in 794, partly to reduce Nara Buddhism’s political power. The shift also paved the way for new movements such as Tendai (founded by Saichō) and Shingon Buddhism (founded by Kūkai).

Between the six Nara schools was the first rigorous attempt by Japanese Buddhist scholars to develop differing interpretations of concepts such as dependent origination, emptiness, non-self (anātman), nirvana, and the Middle Way. Their scholastic foundations later influenced traditions such as Pure Land Buddhism and the Japanese forms of Amitābha devotion.

== The Six Schools (六宗) ==
1. Sanron (三論宗, Sanron-shū) (Mādhyamaka). Also known as the "Three Treatise School," it was introduced by the Korean monk Hyegwan in 625. Based on the Madhyamaka, Hundred Treatise, and Twelve Gate Treatise, it taught the emptiness of all phenomena and the Middle Way between existence and non-existence.
2. Hossō (法相宗, Hossō-shū) (Yogācāra). Also called the "Consciousness-Only School," it focused on analyzing the mind and consciousness. Introduced to Japan from China by Dōshō and other monks in 653, it became one of the most influential Nara traditions.
3. Jōjitsu (成実宗, Jōjitsu-shū). Based on the Satyasiddhi-śāstra, this school focused on abhidharma-style analysis of existence and doctrine. It is often regarded as a branch or auxiliary tradition of the Sanron school.
4. Kegon (華厳宗, 花嚴宗, Kegon-shū) (Huayan). Established in 736, this school centered on the Avataṃsaka Sūtra and taught the interpenetration of all phenomena, where every phenomenon reflects and contains all others in a vast, interconnected reality.
5. Kusha-shū (倶舎宗) (Abhidharma-kosha tradition of the Sarvāstivāda). Sometimes called the "Dharma Analysis School," it examined the nature of existence and the constituents of reality, focusing on questions of the "self" and the elements of being.This school was largely absorbed into the Hossō school through the 8th century.
6. Risshū (律宗) (Vinaya tradition). Introduced to Japan in 753 by the Chinese monk Jianzhen (Ganjin), it emphasized monastic discipline and the strict observance of the prātimokṣa rules of the Dharmaguptaka fraternity of mendicants.

== Legacy ==
The Six Nara Schools were primarily scholastic rather than practice-oriented. Their focus on doctrine and state protection of Buddhism contrasted with later Heian period Buddhism and Kamakura Buddhism, which emphasized salvation and practice for the common people. Despite their decline as dominant institutions, the Hossō, Kegon, and Risshū schools continue to exist today, while the others remain important in the history of Japanese Buddhist thought.

== The Seven Great Temples of the Southern Capital (南都七大寺) ==
- Daian-ji (大安寺)
- Gangō-ji (元興寺)
- Hōryū-ji (法隆寺), located in the town of Ikaruga near present-day Nara.
- Kōfuku-ji (興福寺)
- Saidai-ji (西大寺)
- Tōdai-ji (東大寺)
- Yakushi-ji (薬師寺)

== See also ==
- Buddhism in Japan
- Dharmaguptaka
- Schools of Buddhism
- Vinaya
