= Famen Temple =

Buddhist temple in Shaanxi, China

- 法門寺
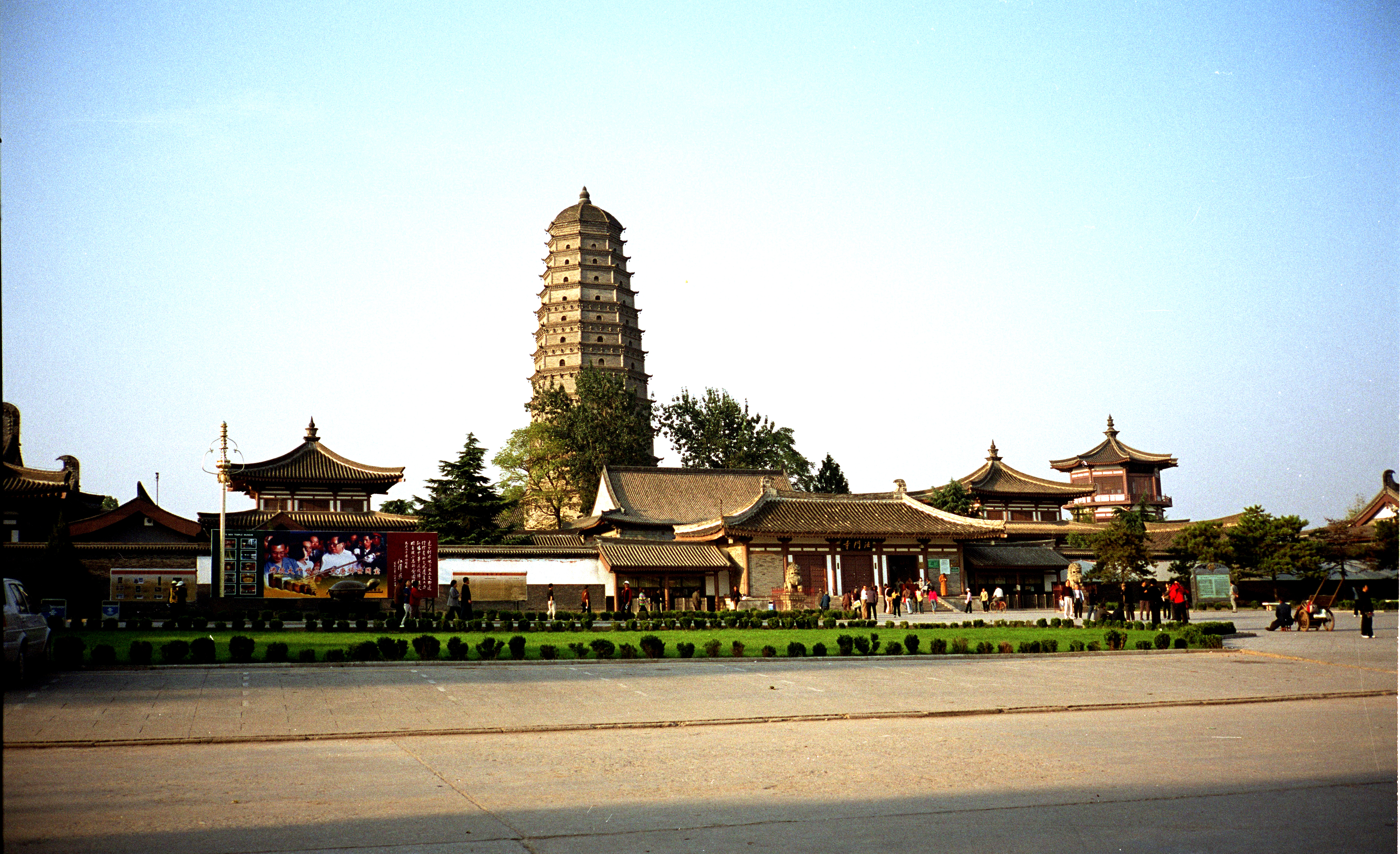
- Famen Temple

Religion
- Affiliation: Buddhism

Location
- Location: Famen Town, Fufeng County, Shaanxi
- Country: China
- Interactive map of Famen Temple
- Coordinates: 34.439896°N 107.904546°E

Architecture
- Style: Chinese architecture
- Established: Eastern Han
- Completed: 1987 (reconstruction)

Famen Temple (simplified Chinese: 法门寺; traditional Chinese: 法門寺; pinyin: Fǎmén Sì) is a Buddhist temple located in Famen town (法門鎮), Fufeng County, 120 kilometers west of Xi'an, Shaanxi, China. It is widely regarded as the "ancestor of pagoda temples in Guanzhong".

== History ==
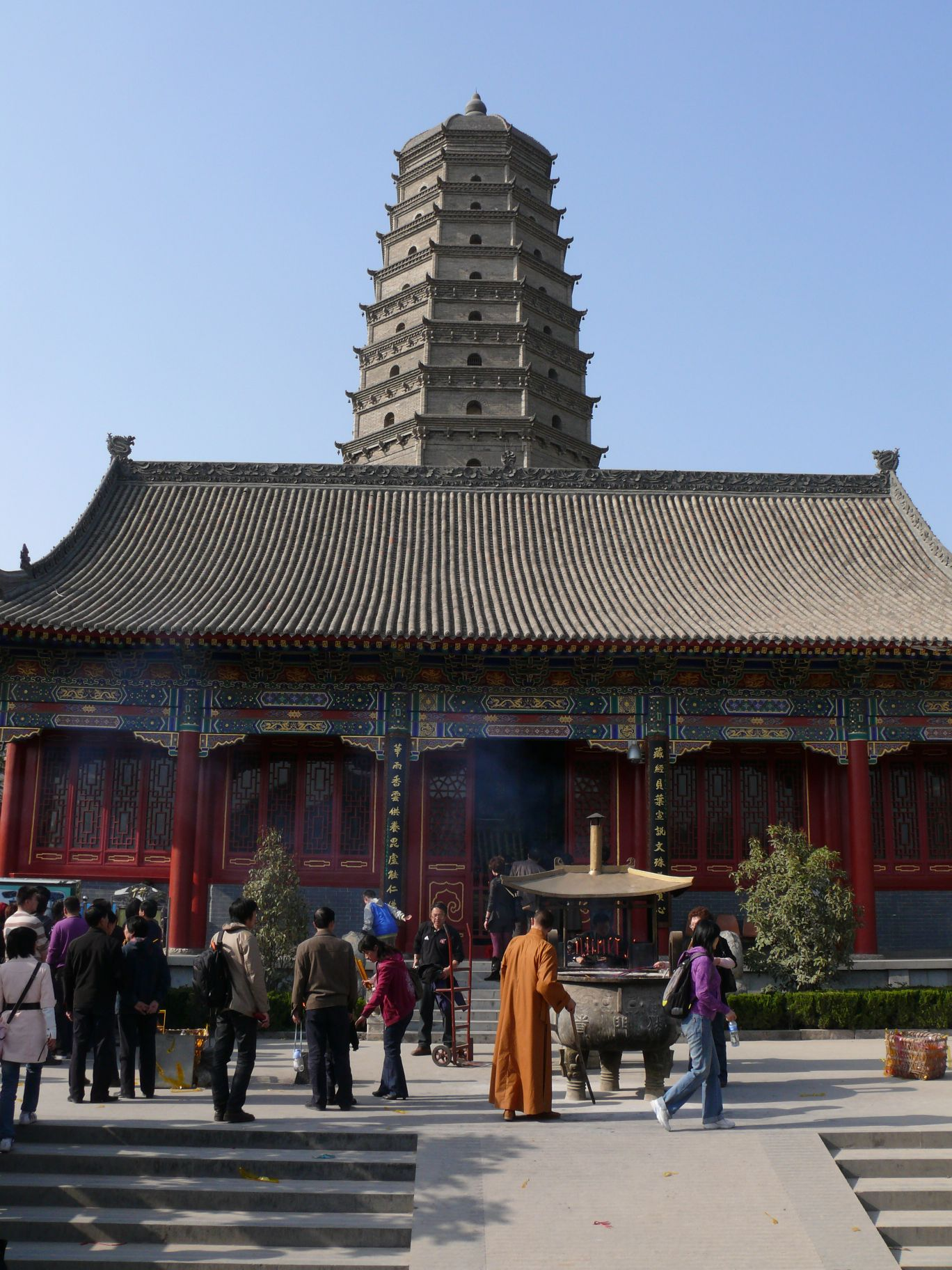
Famen Temple

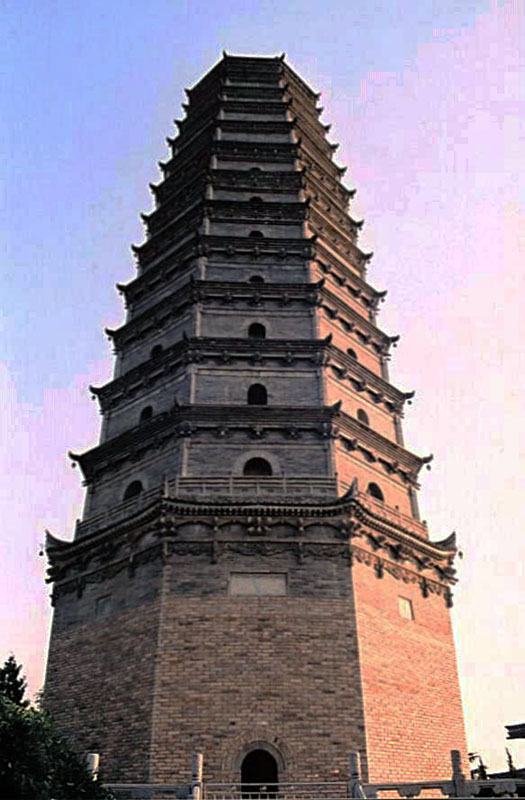
Famen Temple Pagoda

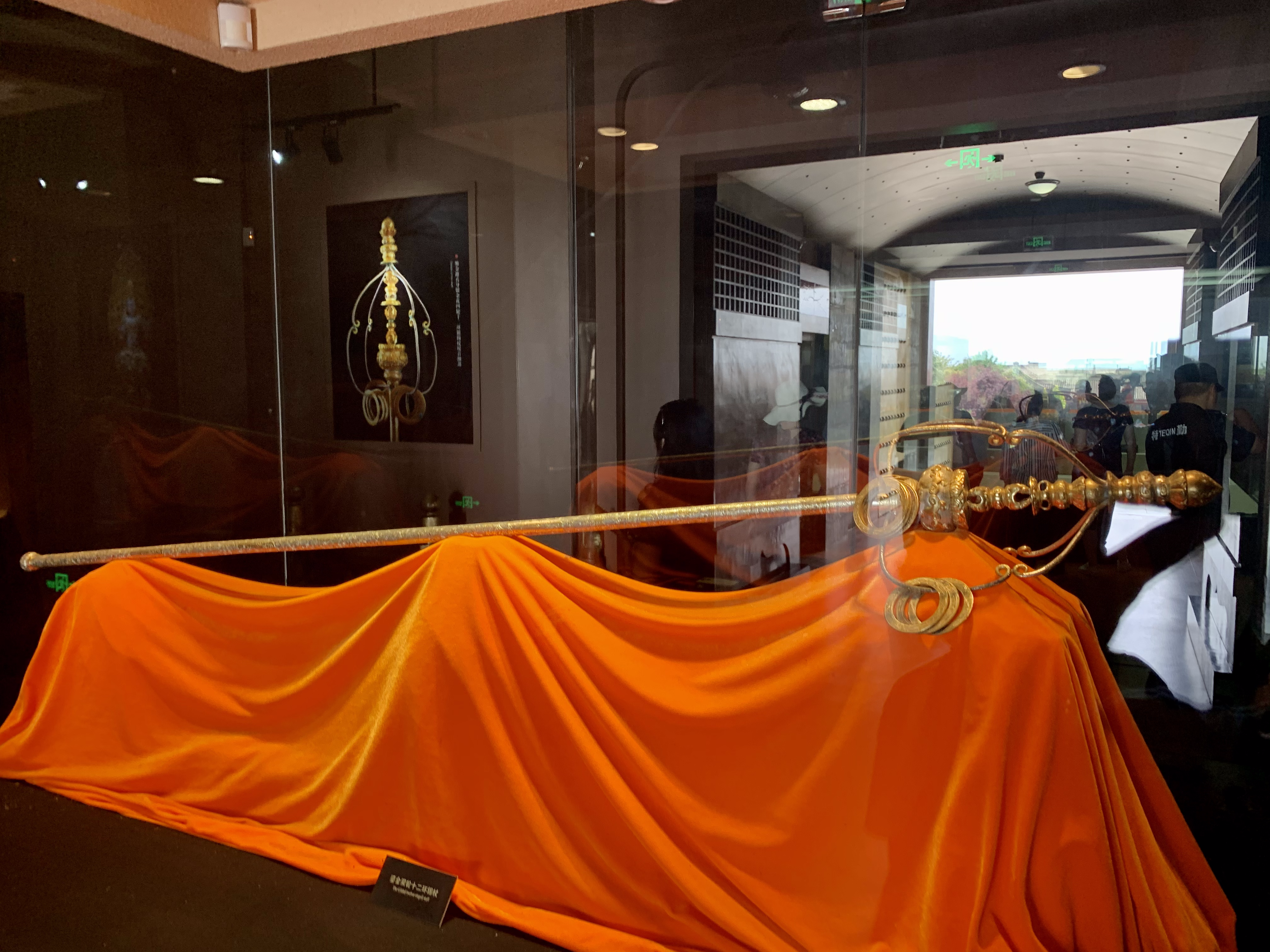
The Famen Temple Staff, constructed in 873 and donated to the temple by the emperor, 14th year of Emperor Yizong of Tang's reign

=== Han dynasty ===
One theory, supported by unearthed eaves-tiles and carved bricks of the Han dynasty (206 BC–220 AD), is that the temple was built by Emperor Huan and also by Emperor Ling of the Eastern Han dynasty (25–220).

=== Northern dynasties ===
The literature record indicates that during the Northern Wei dynasty (386–534), Famen Temple already existed on a quite large scale. However, Buddhism was greatly suppressed in Emperor Wu's years of the Northern Zhou dynasty (557–581), and Famen Temple was almost completely destroyed.

=== Sui dynasty ===
After establishment of the Sui dynasty (589–618), Buddhism was venerated, and Famen Temple was rebuilt, although it couldn't be restored to its condition from the Northern Wei dynasty. It was renamed to Cheng Shi Dao Chang (成實道場), and was merged with the nearby Baochang Temple (寶昌寺), becoming a temple-owned farm.

=== Tang dynasty ===
Famen Temple entered its halcyon days after formation of the Tang dynasty (618–907). During the first year of the reign of Wude of the Tang dynasty (618), it was named Famen Temple, and monks were recruited the following year. Later, the temple took in homeless people fleeing chaos caused by war at the end of the Sui dynasty, and was unfortunately burned. It was rebuilt later by monks. In Zhenguan 5th year (631), Zhang Liang was appointed to demolish Wangyun Palace to build the pagoda. It was rebuilt in Gaozong Xianqing 5th year (660), and was a four-storied pavilion-like pagoda. It was named later by Tang Zhongzong True Relic Pagoda. Tang Zhongzong actively advocated Buddhism, and along with Empress Wei buried their hair under the pagoda (unearthed in autumn 1978). Jinglong 4th year (710), the temple was renamed Grand Empire Carefree King Temple (圣朝无忧王寺), and the pagoda Grand True Relic Pagoda (大圣真身宝塔). In Wenzong Kaicheng 3rd year (AD 838), it was renamed Fayun Temple, but soon reverted to the name Famen. When Buddhism was suppressed in Huichang in the year of Wuzong, Famen Temple was affected. During Yizong's reign, the last Buddha relic acquisition in the Tang dynasty took place. At that time, Famen Temple was rebuilt, and its underground palace was not later altered. The emperors of the Tang dynasty acquired Buddha relics 7 times here, and every time donated generously, which facilitated the expansion of the temple and pagoda. After being built and renovated multiple times, Famen Temple evolved into a scale of 24 courtyards.

=== Five Dynasties and Ten Kingdoms period ===
During the Five Dynasties and Ten Kingdoms period, the Prince of Qin Li Maozhen spent more than 30 years renovating Famen Temple. In Houzhou Zhizong's year, Buddhism was restricted, but Famen Temple was not abandoned.

=== Song and Jin dynasties ===
After establishment of the North Song dynasty, Famen Temple was revived again. After being renovated many times, in Da'an 2nd year, Jin dynasty, it was claimed to be "Temple and Pagoda against Heaven".

=== Ming dynasty ===
During Longqing's years (1567–1572) of the Ming dynasty, Famen Temple was greatly destroyed in Guanzhong earthquake, and the wood pagoda built during the Tang dynasty collapsed. In Wanli 7th year (1579), the "True Relic Pagoda" was rebuilt into a 13-storied brick-mimic-timber structured pavilion-like pagoda.

=== Qing dynasty ===
During the Qing dynasty, Famen Temple was renovated in Shunzhi 12th year (1655), Qianlong 34th year (1769), and Guangxu 10th year (1884). In Tongzhi 1st year (1862), the temple was damaged during the Dungan Revolt. It was rebuilt later on a smaller scale.

=== Republic of China ===
After formation of the Republic of China, Famen Temple was used to station army continuously, and it was largely ruined. Because of natural and man-made calamities and the masses living in dire poverty, North China Philanthropy Association decided to rebuild the temple and pagoda, and use labor work as methods to relieve the distress. The reconstruction started in 1938, and concluded in July 1940. A month later, the Buddhist activities were restored.

=== People's Republic of China ===
After the establishment of the People's Republic of China, Famen Temple was among the first key protected historical relics of the province. However, the properties of the temple were still appropriated for public uses, such as schools in Famen town. During the Cultural Revolution, the Red Guard damaged temple halls and Buddhist figures under the name of "breaking four old fashions". The abbot, Liangqing (良卿法师), incinerated himself in front of the True Relic Pagoda, in order to protect temple's underground palace. When the palace was unearthed later, the relic of self-immolation could still be seen. Other monks were either demobilized or killed. The temple became "the temporary headquarters of proletariat rebellion of Fufeng County". After 1979, Shaanxi province government once funded restoration of the Mahavira Hall and the Brass Buddha Pavilion (铜佛阁). At 1:57 a.m. on 4 August 1981, half of the side wall of True Relic Pagoda collapsed in the heavy rain. This incident drew universal attention. In 1984, the government implemented religious policy and handed over Famen Temple to the Buddhist community. In 1985, Shaanxi province government decided to pull down the remaining half side wall and rebuild the True Relic Pagoda. On 3 April 1987, the underground palace of True Relic Pagoda in Famen Temple was opened, and large quantities of precious historical relics were unearthed. The expansion of the temple and the reconstruction of the pagoda were completed in October 1988. On 9 November of the same year, the Famen Temple Museum was opened.

On 16 October 2014, the World Fellowship of Buddhists held its 27th General Conference in the temple marking a milestone as was the first time the conference was held in China.

== New complex ==
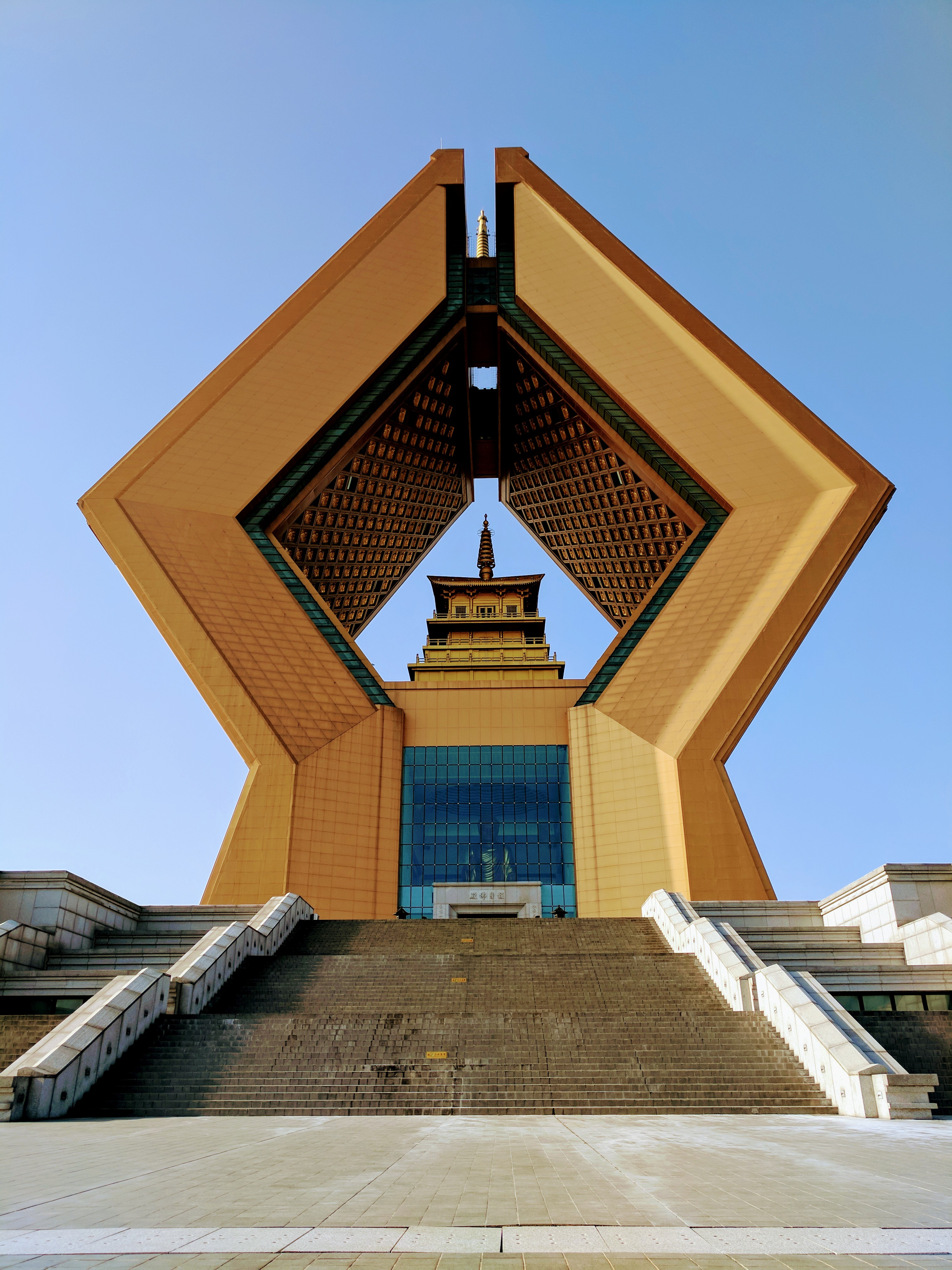
The new complex

In May 2009 the Shaanxi government finished constructing the first phase of a much larger complex in addition to the Famen Temple. The new "Famen Temple Cultural Scenic Area" added 150 acres (0.61 km^{2}) to the temple complex. The most obvious feature of the new complex is the 148m Namaste Dagoba and vault (see below).

== Architecture ==
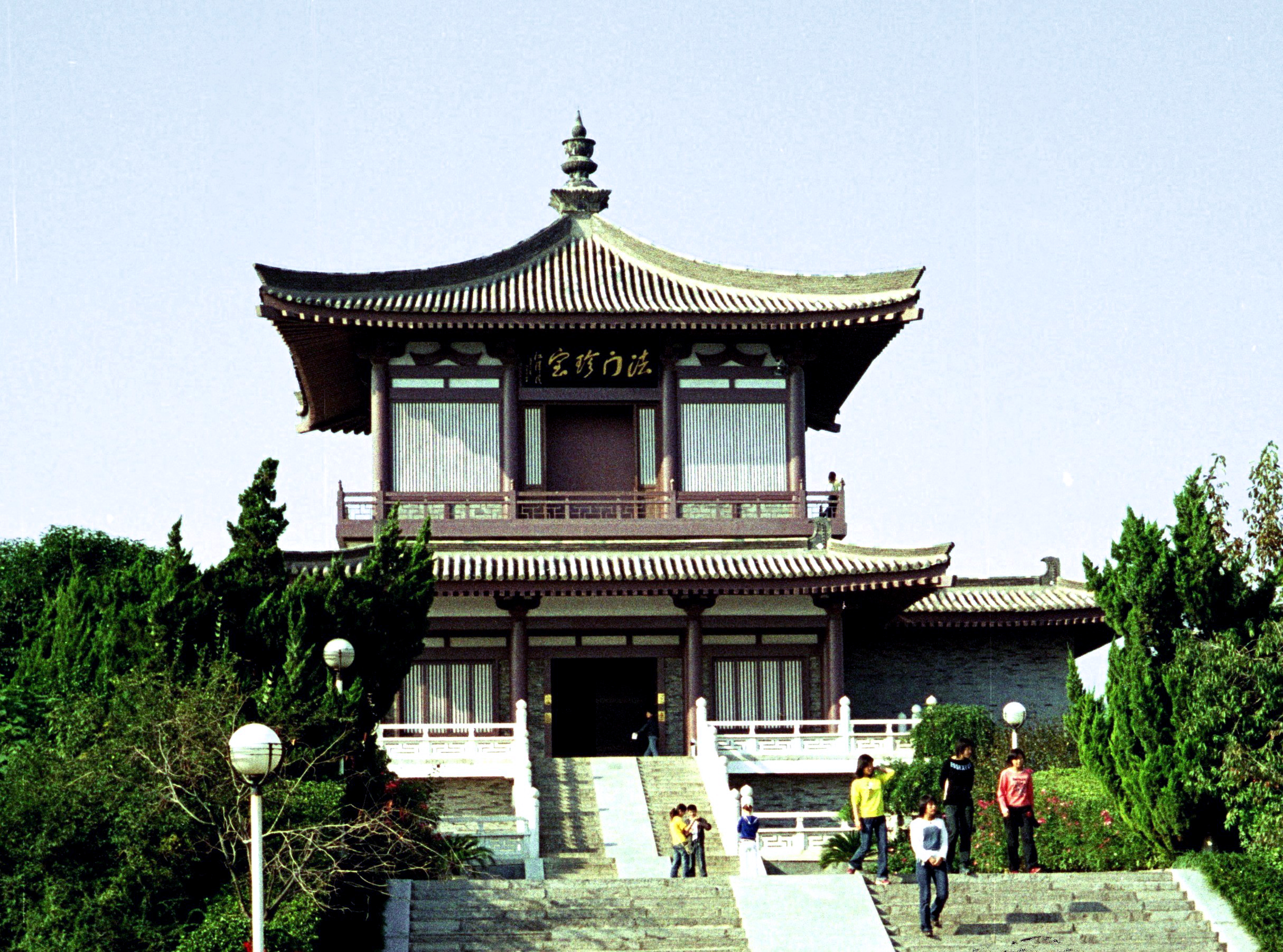
Famen Temple Treasure Hall (珍寶館)

Famen Temple currently maintains a layout style which could be described as "Grand Hall following Pagoda". The True Relic Pagoda is regarded as the middle axle of the temple. Before it stand the Front Gate, the Front Hall, and behind it is the Grand Hall of Great Sage. This is the typical layout of the early Buddhist temples in China.

The True Relic Pagoda has been altered several times. It evolved from a four-storied pavilion-like pagoda in the Tang dynasty to a thirteen-storied brick pagoda in the Ming dynasty. The current version was rebuilt based on the surveyed drawing of the pagoda in the Ming dynasty before it collapsed. It is made of an armored concrete skeleton, and then covered by grey bricks. Inside the pagoda there are sightseeing platforms for tourists.

The underground palace was restored to the structure it had in the Tang dynasty. Only a few severely damaged parts were replaced. The whole palace was built out of white marble and limestone tablets. The inner walls and stony gate are engraved all over. During the renovation of the underground palace, a circular basement was built surrounding the Tang palace and Buddhist shrines were included. The preserved Buddhist finger relic rests at the center of the underground palace.

The western division of the temple is Famen Temple Museum, including a multi-function reception hall, treasure hall, and other buildings.

== Relics ==
=== Buddha's relics ===
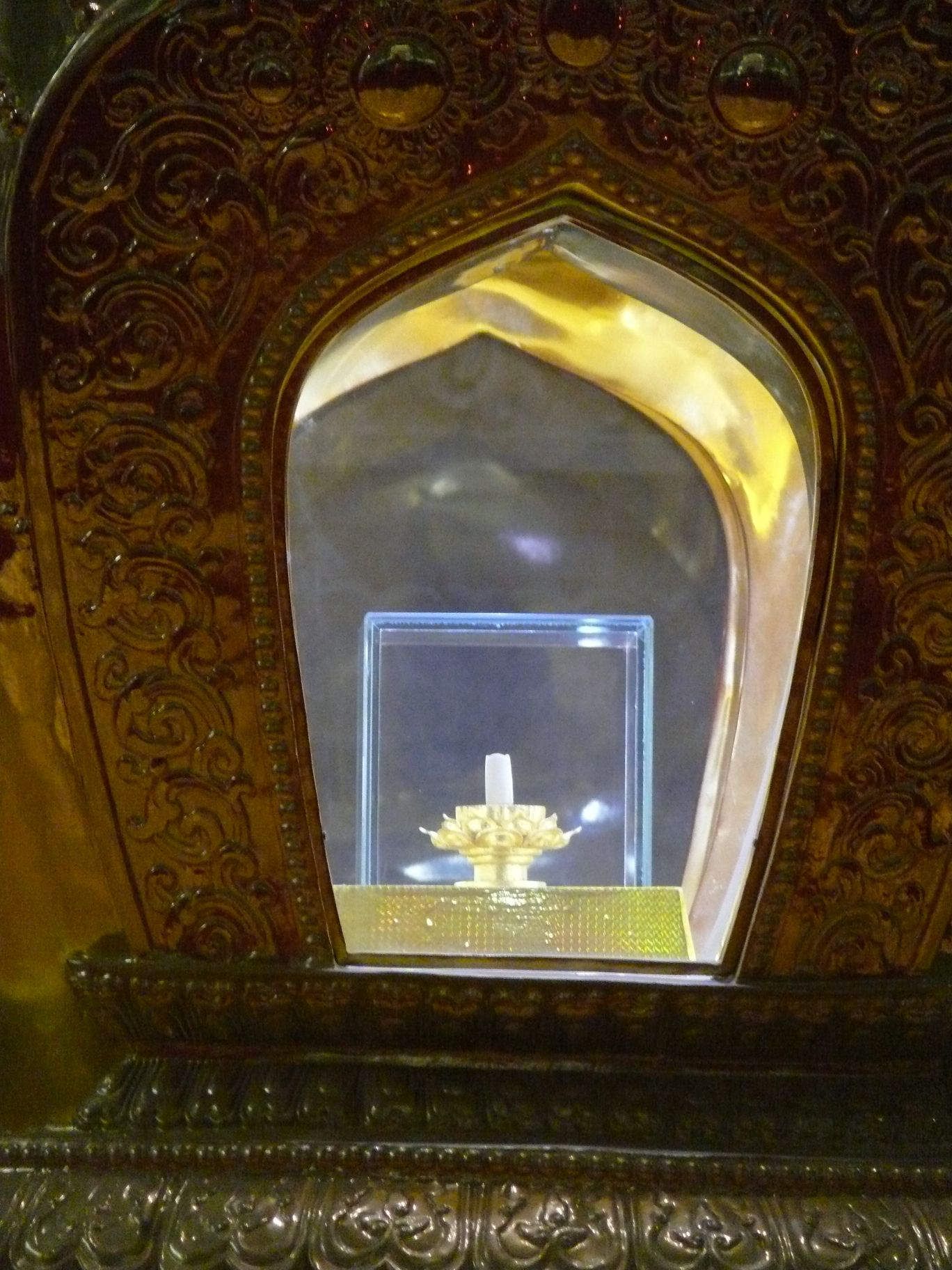
Relic displayed in the new complex

From 5–12 May 1987, after the opening of an underground palace, four relics claimed to be directly related to Buddha were found. Two of these were made of white jade. The third relic was from a famous monk. These three are called "duplicate relics" (影骨). They were placed together with a "true relic" (靈骨) in order to protect them. The true relic is yellow-colored, with bone-like secretory granules. It is believed to be a finger bone of the Gautama Buddha (Sakyamuni). Thereafter, Famen Temple became a Buddhist place of pilgrimage due to the discovery of what is claimed as a true relic of Buddha.

The finger bone was preserved in the innermost box in a set of eight boxes, each of which encloses the next-smallest box wrapped in a layer of thin silk. The outermost box was in sandalwood and had rotted away, but the smaller boxes were in gold, some in silver, and one in jade, and are in a good state of preservation. Each box has a silver lock and was exquisitely carved.

The true relic is exactly the same as the description by the Tang dynasty Buddhist DaoXuan and other Tang dynasty records.

The relics have been abroad four times, 1994/11/29 - 1995/02/29 in Thailand, 2002/02/23 - 2002/03/30 in Taiwan, 2004/05/26 - 2004/06/05 in Hong Kong, 2005/11/11 - 2005/12/21 in South Korea.

=== Gold & silver relics ===
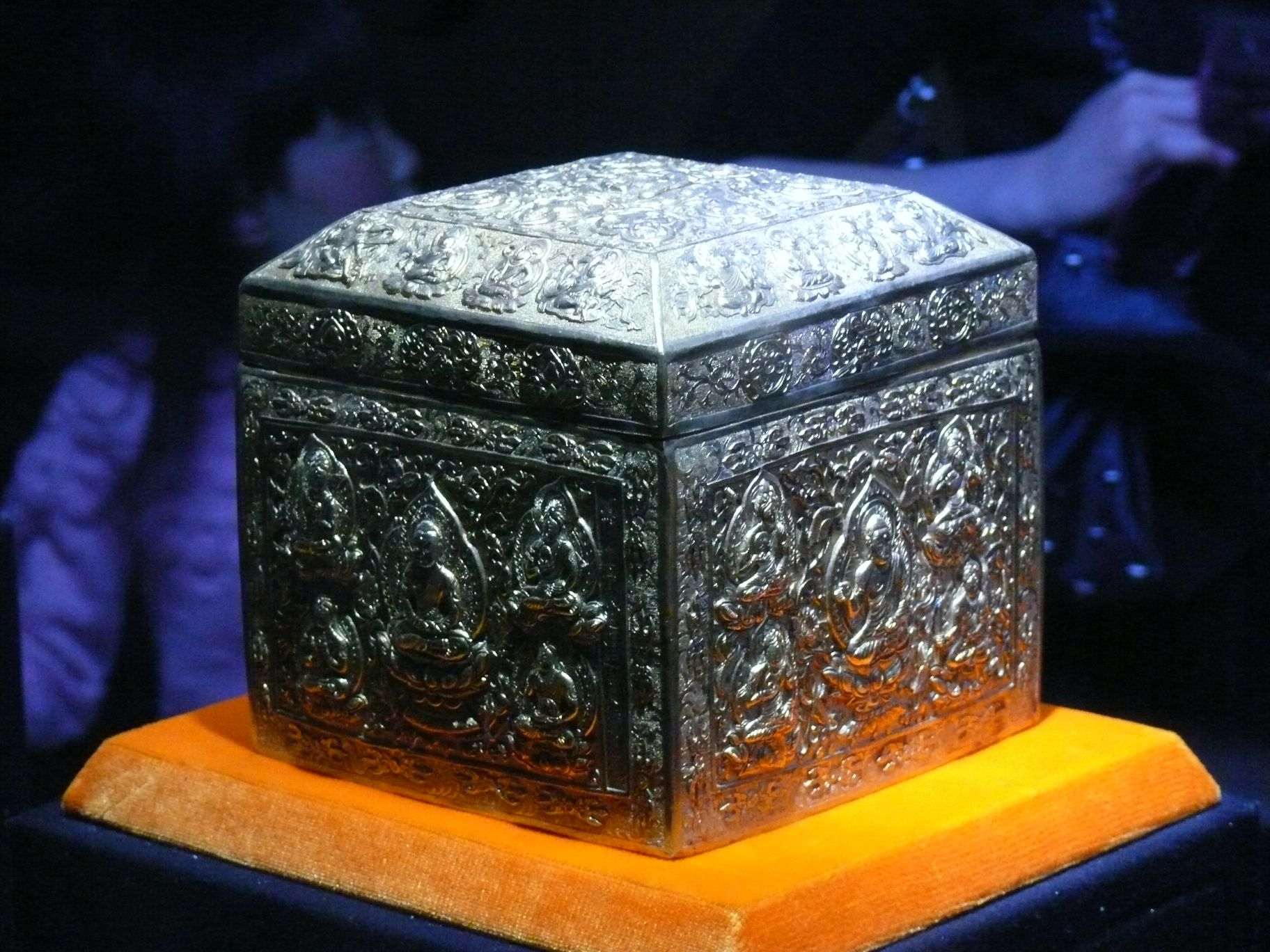
Silver container displayed in the museum

The underground "Palace" is now a museum, and contains some other relics. One of the best preserved is a gilt silver tea set, said to be one of the earliest royal tea sets ever discovered. It includes a tea caddy woven out of metallic yarn, a gilt silver tortoise-shaped tea box, a tea roller-grinder, and a silver stove for brewing the tea. As a part of the set, a kind of container for mixing tea, called a Tiao Da Zi, was used for tea mixing and drinking, since in ancient China the tea drinking ceremony was treated to some extent just like a meal. First, tea was put into the container and spices added. Some boiled water was used to mix the tea into paste, and them more hot water was added to make it into drinkable tea.

In addition, there is a magnificent silver-gilded incense burner on display, as well as a silver-gold decorated sandalwood burner. This consists of a burner cover, stack, feet and other parts. The bottom rim of the cover is decorated with a circle of lotus petals patterns, and the upper part is carved with five lotuses and enlaced tendrils. On each lotus lies a tortoise with its head turned back, holding flowers in its mouth. The burner has five feet in the shape of beasts, the front parts of which are in the shape of unicorns. The inscription on the burner indicates that it was made in 869 AD by an imperial workshop specialized in fabricating gold and silver ware for the imperial family.

A tortoise-shaped gold-plated container with silver inlays is on display in the museum, the cover of which carved with turtle-shell and brocade patterns. The container is 13 cm high, 28.3 cm long, 15 cm wide. In addition, there is a set of five gilded-silver plates of exquisite workmanship believed to date from the Tang dynasty.

A magnificent set of miniature costumes specially fabricated for the Bodhisattva can be seen, the most typical being a half-sleeved blouse 6.5 cm in length, with 4.1 cm-long sleeves. This modelled on a typical short sleeved blouse worn by ladies in the Tang dynasty, and is made in the style of what the Chinese call "Gold Couching Embroidery," and is top-grade crinkled embroidery made by embroidering with gold threads. The blouse was worn drooped to the chest and has buttons down the front, with the collar and sleeve rims decorated with patterns embroidered with twisted gold threads. The average diameter of the gold threads is 0.1mm, with the thinnest segment as thin as 0.06mm, which is thinner than a hair. Moreover, one meter of gold thread is made of 3,000 circles of gold foil, which is hard to achieve even in modern times characterized by high technology. In particular, loop edges of the gold threads make the fabric seem like a painting, and are arranged to display gradually changing colours. The garment is obviously made by a master-hand and can be rated as an unsurpassed piece of embroidery.

Also on display are 121 gold and silver articles, 17 glass articles, 16 pieces of olive green porcelain, more than 700 pieces of silk fabrics, 104 Buddhist figurines, hundreds of volumes of Buddhist scripture.

=== Colored glaze ===
Colored Glaze is just today's glass. Chinese glass manufacturing technology was long influenced by western Asia, and most common style was Islamic. Because of it rarity, glass apparatus was as valuable as gold and jade. The unearthed glass apparatuses are mostly hollowware such as disks, plates and bowls, totally over 20 pieces.

=== Ceramics ===
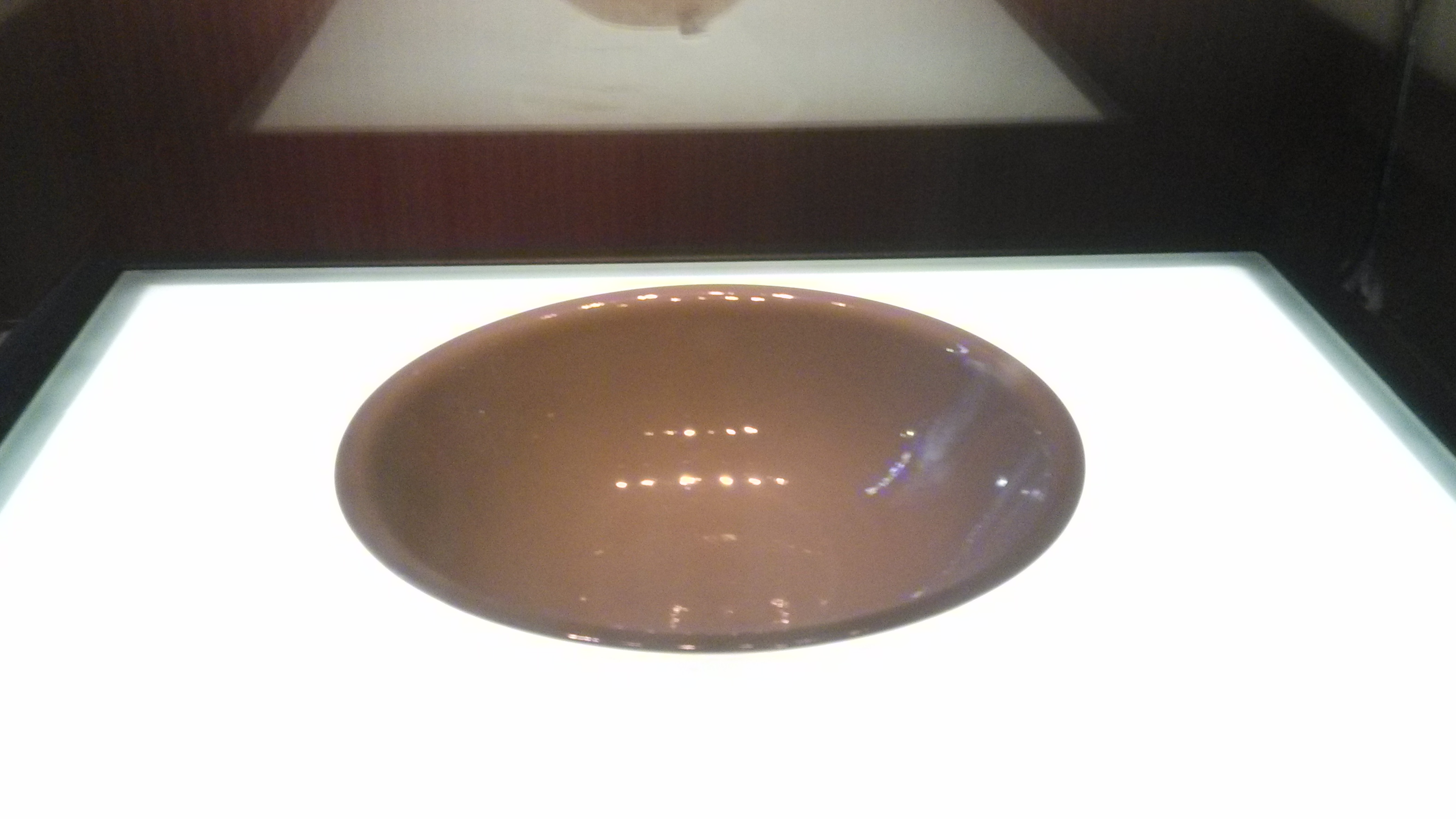
A mi se ceramic

Chinese celadon were highly regarded by connoisseurs, and sometimes made more or less exclusively for the court. Of particular note was an earlier type such as the mi se (秘色瓷 "secret colour" or "mystic colour") wares. Speculation arose concerning whether mi se referred to the secret craft of the glazing colour or if it referred to a specific colour. The ceramic type was finally identified when the underground crypt at the Famen Temple was opened, revealing a description on the accounting tablet in the underground palace, and by the unearthing of thirteen precious pieces of mi se ceramics.

=== Silk ===
China's silk industry reached its prime time in the Tang dynasty, and the silk fabrics discovered in underground palace provided a convincing evidence. Most of those fabrics were contributed by former Empresses. Among them there is an "Empress Wu's Embroidered Skirt" belonging to Wu Zetian.

=== Figure of Buddha ===
There were 88 niches of Buddha in the 13-storied pagoda in the Ming dynasty, each containing a figure. By 1939, there were only 68 left. Later after clear-up, 98 figures of Buddha had been found in total, many containing scriptures, sealed at the times of the Ming dynasty and the Republic of China.

== Namaste Dagoba ==
The Dagoba is designed by Taipei 101 architect C. Y. Lee. With the height of a 35-story building (148m), the Namaste Dagoba is likely (yet unverified) the tallest Buddhist stupa in the world. The Dagoba was designed to not only be a place of worship but to house the relics unearthed from the Famen pagoda.

== See also ==
- List of Chinese cultural relics forbidden to be exhibited abroad
