= Tōshōdai-ji =

Buddhist temple in Nara Prefecture, Japan

Coordinates: 34°40′32.11″N 135°47′5.40″E

Tōshōdai-ji 唐招提寺
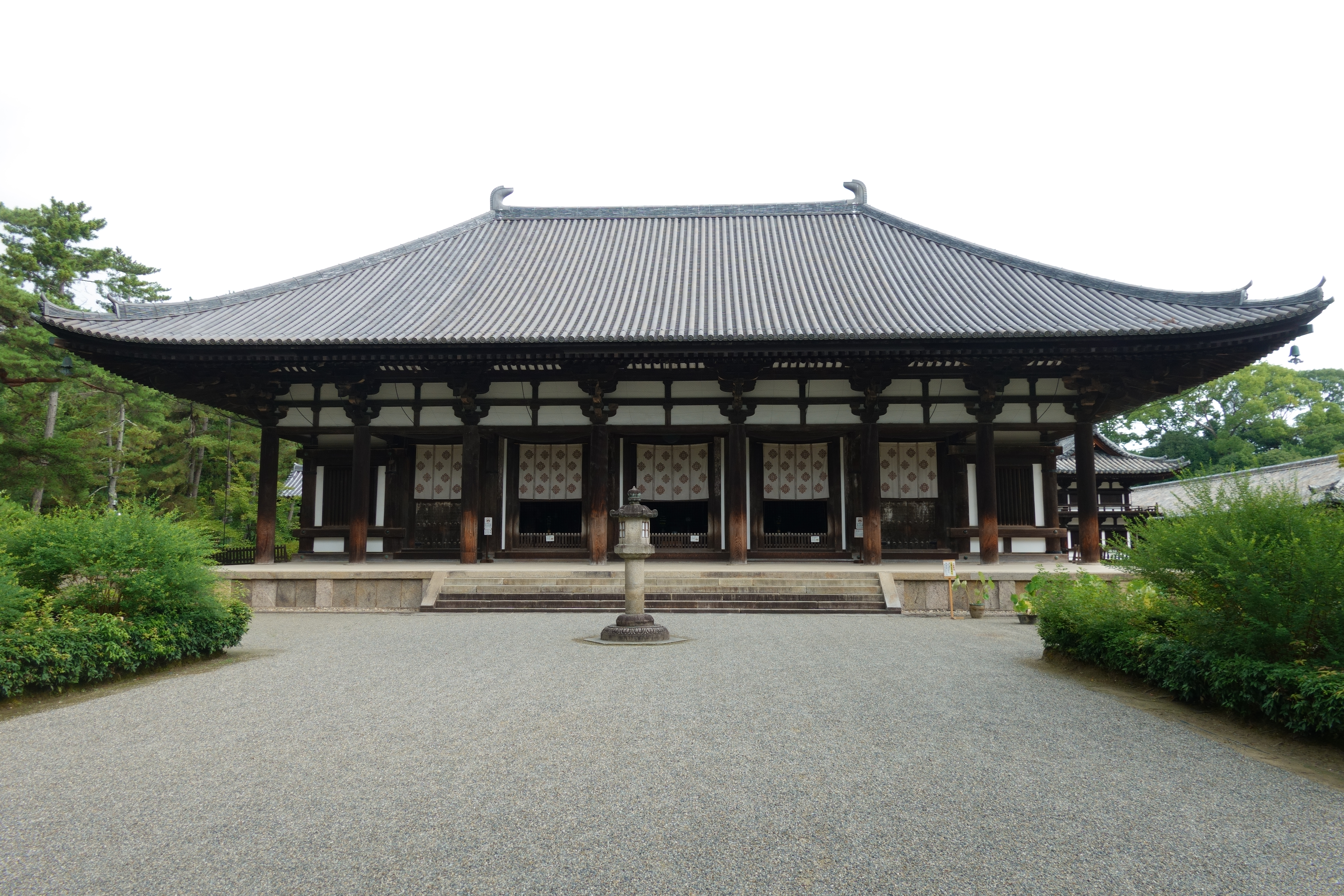
- The Golden Hall (kondō), a National Treasure

Religion
- Affiliation: Risshū
- Deity: Rushana-butsu (Vairocana)

Location
- Location: 13–46 Gojō-chō, Nara, Nara Prefecture
- Country: Japan
- Interactive map of Tōshōdai-ji 唐招提寺

Architecture
- Founder: Jianzhen (Ganjin)
- Completed: 759

Website
- www.toshodaiji.jp

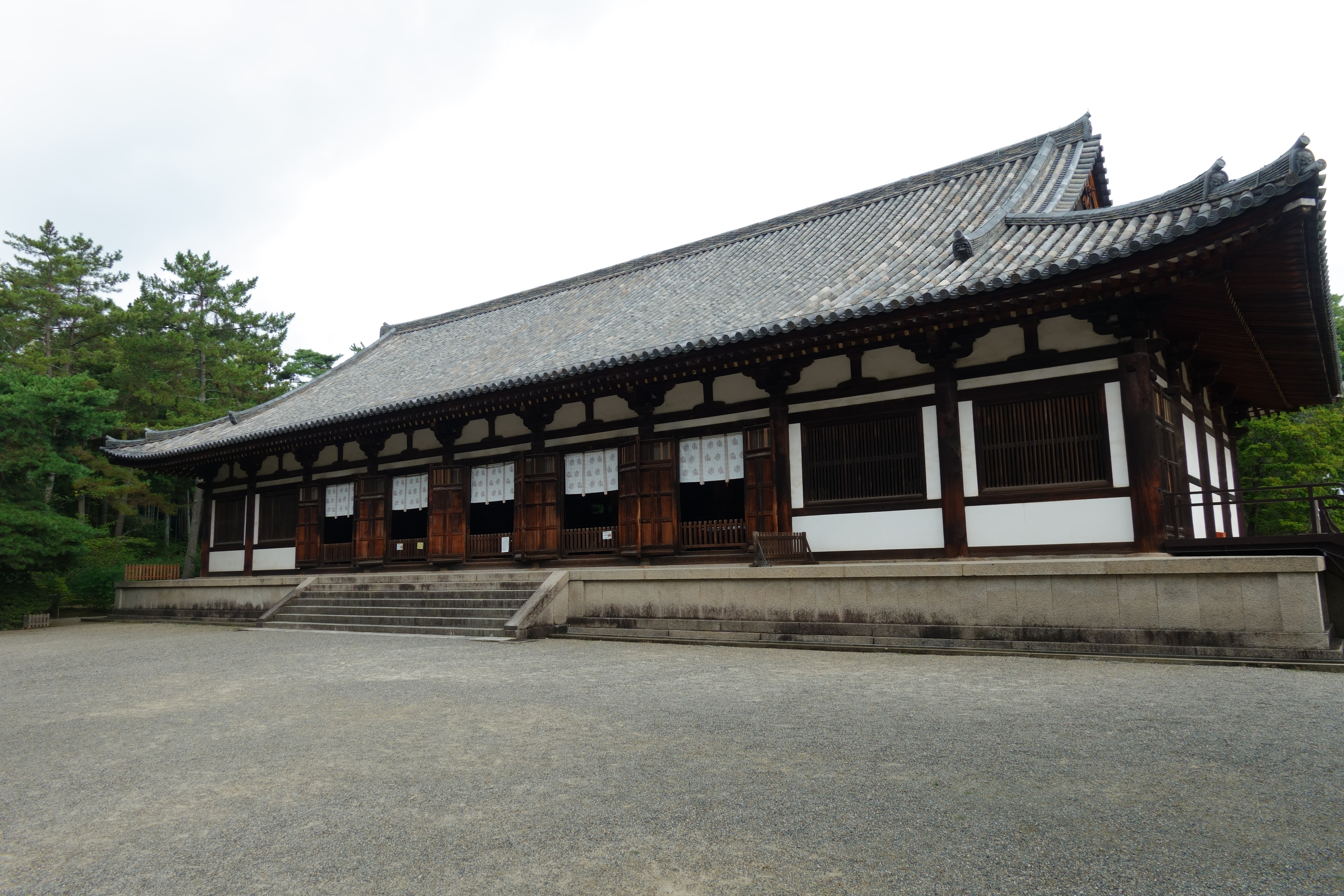
Lecture Hall

Tōshōdai-ji (唐招提寺) is a Buddhist temple of the Risshū sect in the city of Nara, in Nara Prefecture, Japan. The Classic Golden Hall, also known as the kondō, has a single story, hipped tiled roof with a seven bay wide facade. It is considered the archetype of "classical style".

It was founded in 759 by the Tang dynasty Chinese monk Jianzhen during the Nara period. Jianzhen was hired by the newly empowered clans to travel in search of funding from private aristocrats as well.

Tōshōdai-ji is one of the places in Nara that UNESCO has designated as World Heritage Site "Historic Monuments of Ancient Nara".

A reflection written by Yan Wenjing on the hope for friendly Sino-Japanese relations describing the author's discovery of lotus flowers imported from China which had been planted around the portrait of Jianzhen in the Tōshōdai-ji is included as one of the oral assessment passages on the Putonghua Proficiency Test.

== Building list ==
- Golden Hall – National Treasure of Japan, built in the Nara period (710 to 794).
- Korō – National Treasure of Japan, rebuilt in 1240.
- Kōdō (Lecture Hall) – National Treasure of Japan, built in the Nara period.
- Hōzō (Treasure House) – National Treasure of Japan, built in the Nara period.
- Kyōzō (Sutra Storehouse) – National Treasure of Japan, built in the Nara period.
- Mieidō – Important Cultural Property.
- Raidō – Important Cultural Property.
- Shinden – Important Cultural Property.
- Nandaimon

== Gallery ==
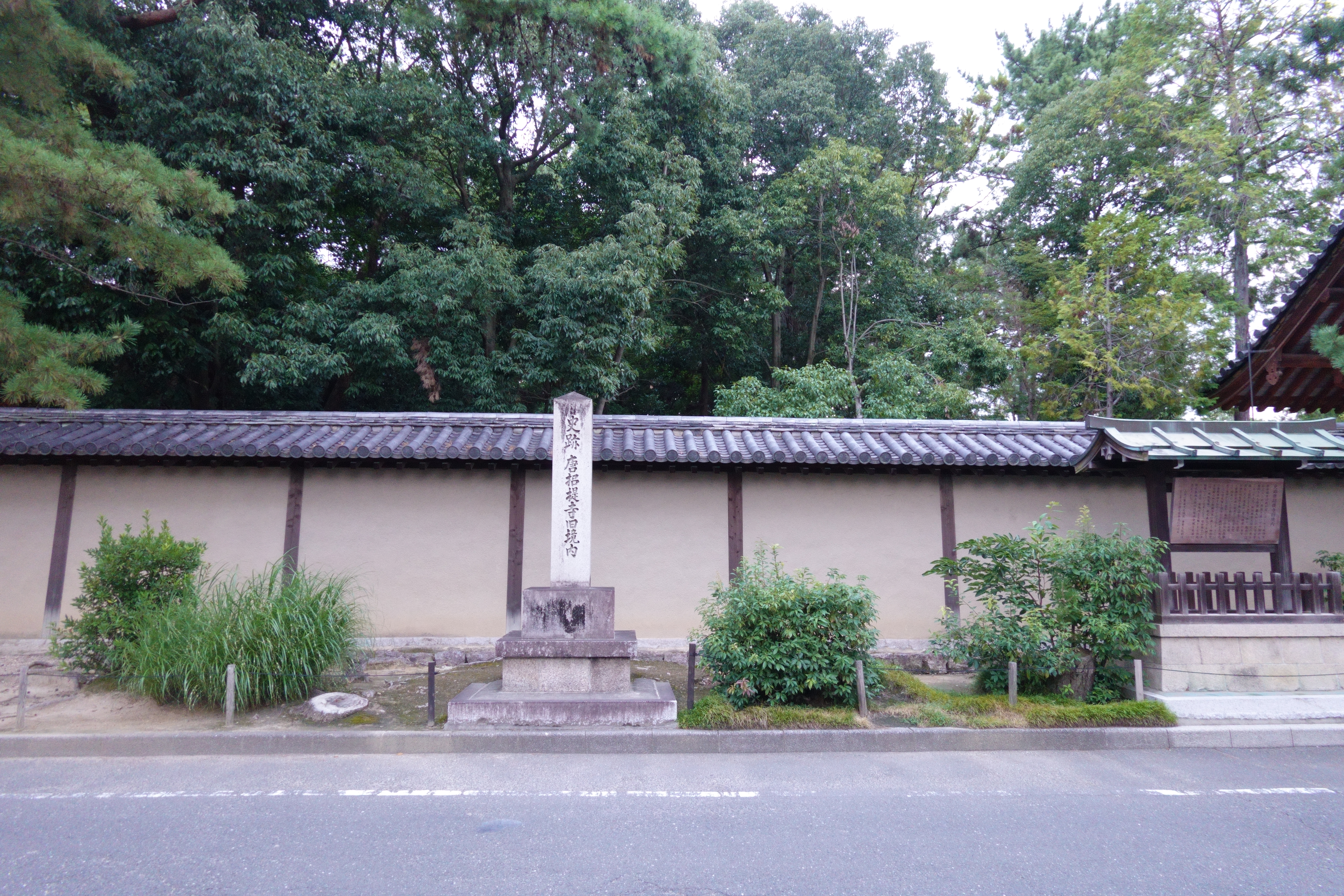
Memorial in front of Toushoudai-ji

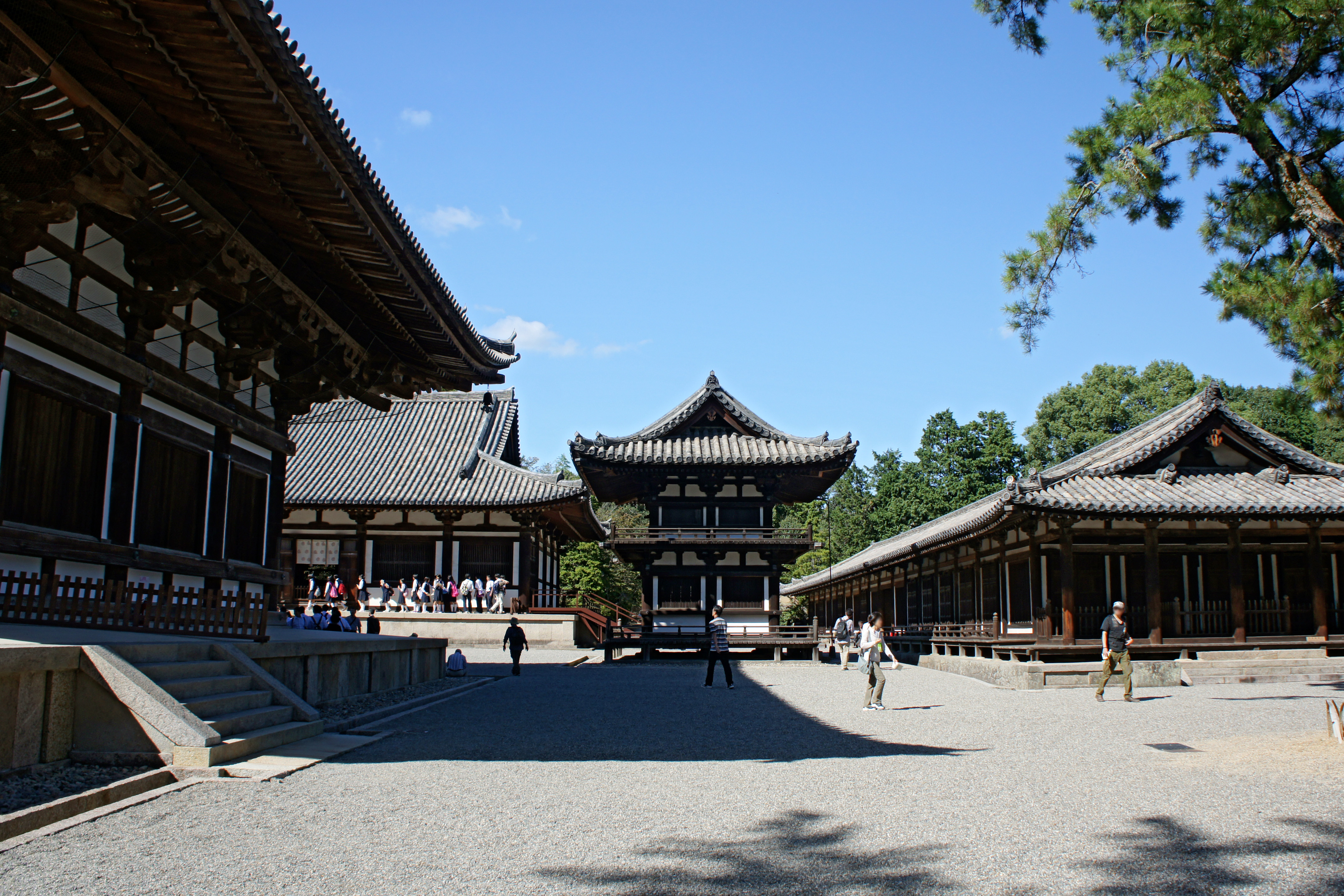
Shichidō garan

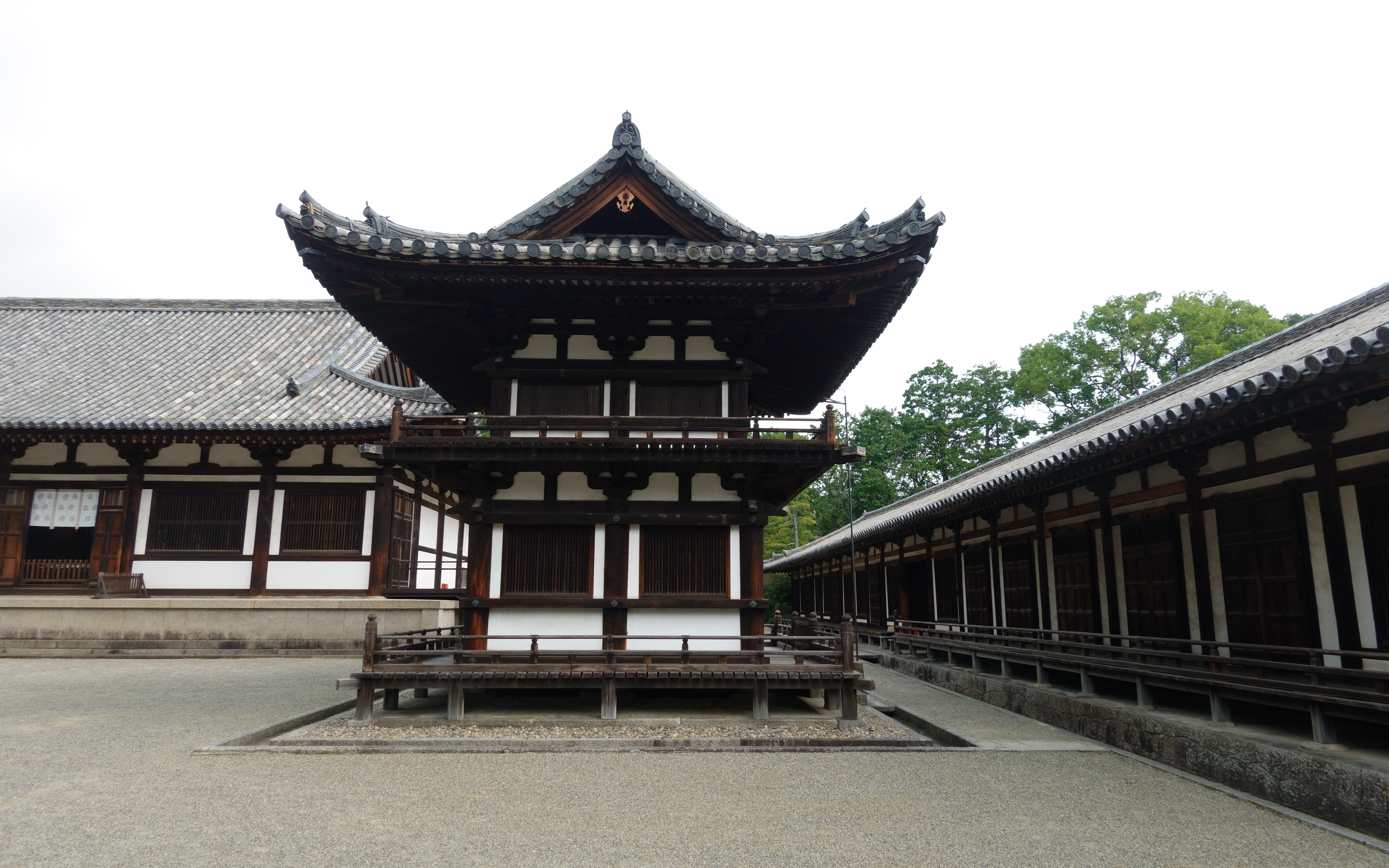
Korō

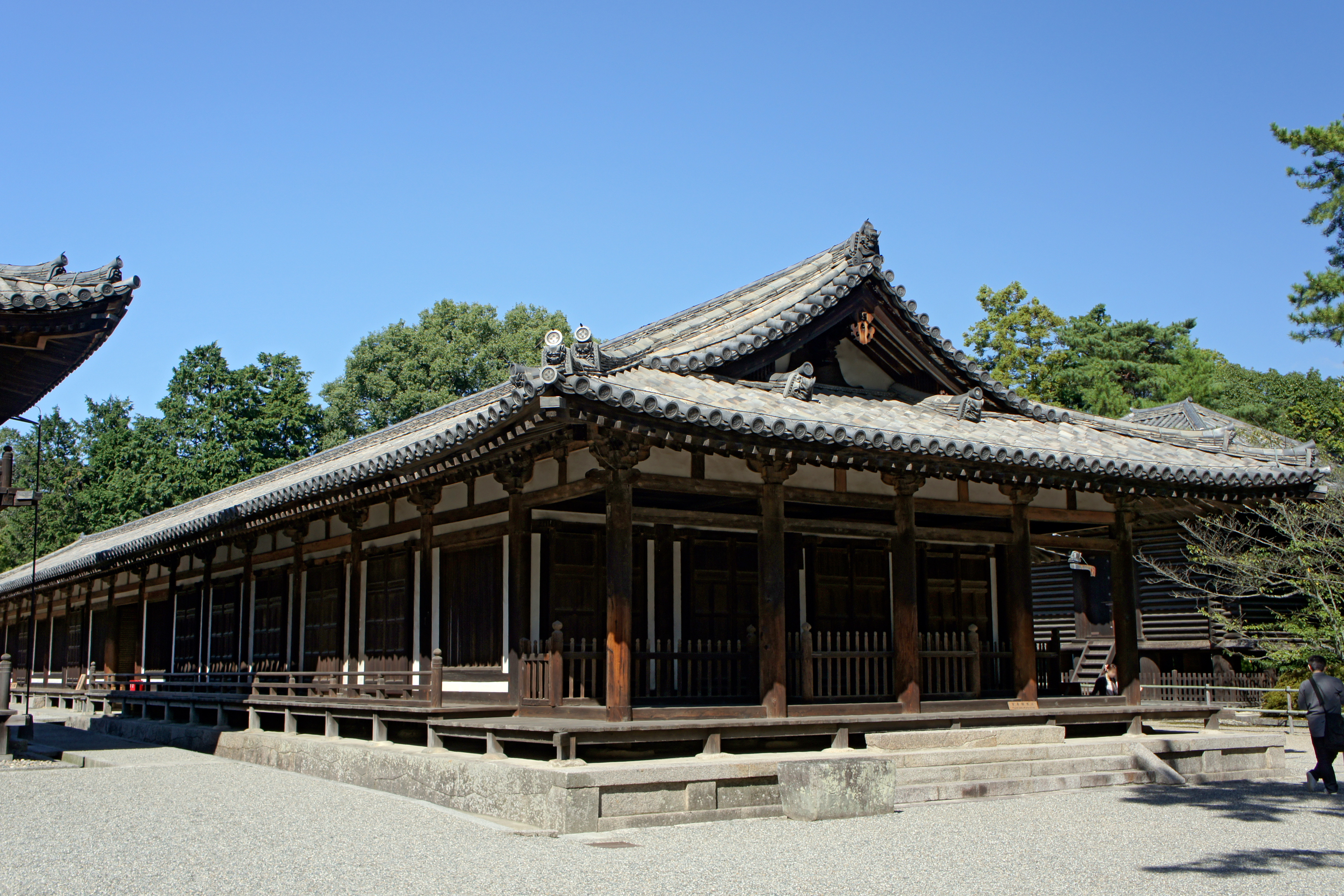
Raidō

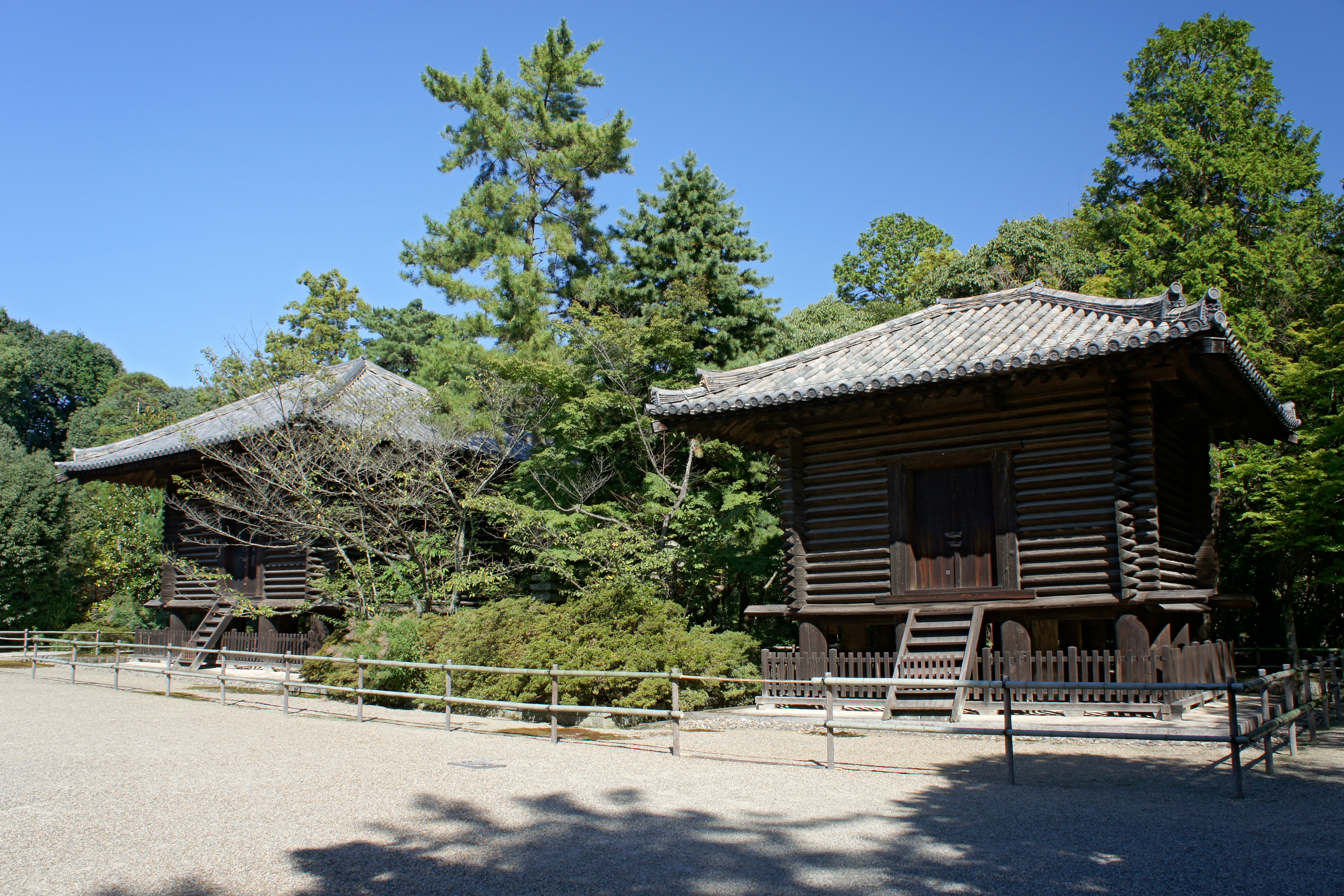
Hōzō and Kyōzō

== See also ==
- Glossary of Japanese Buddhism
- List of National Treasures of Japan (crafts-others)
- List of National Treasures of Japan (sculptures)
- List of National Treasures of Japan (temples)
- Tourism in Japan
