= Ritsu-shū =

School of Nara Buddhism

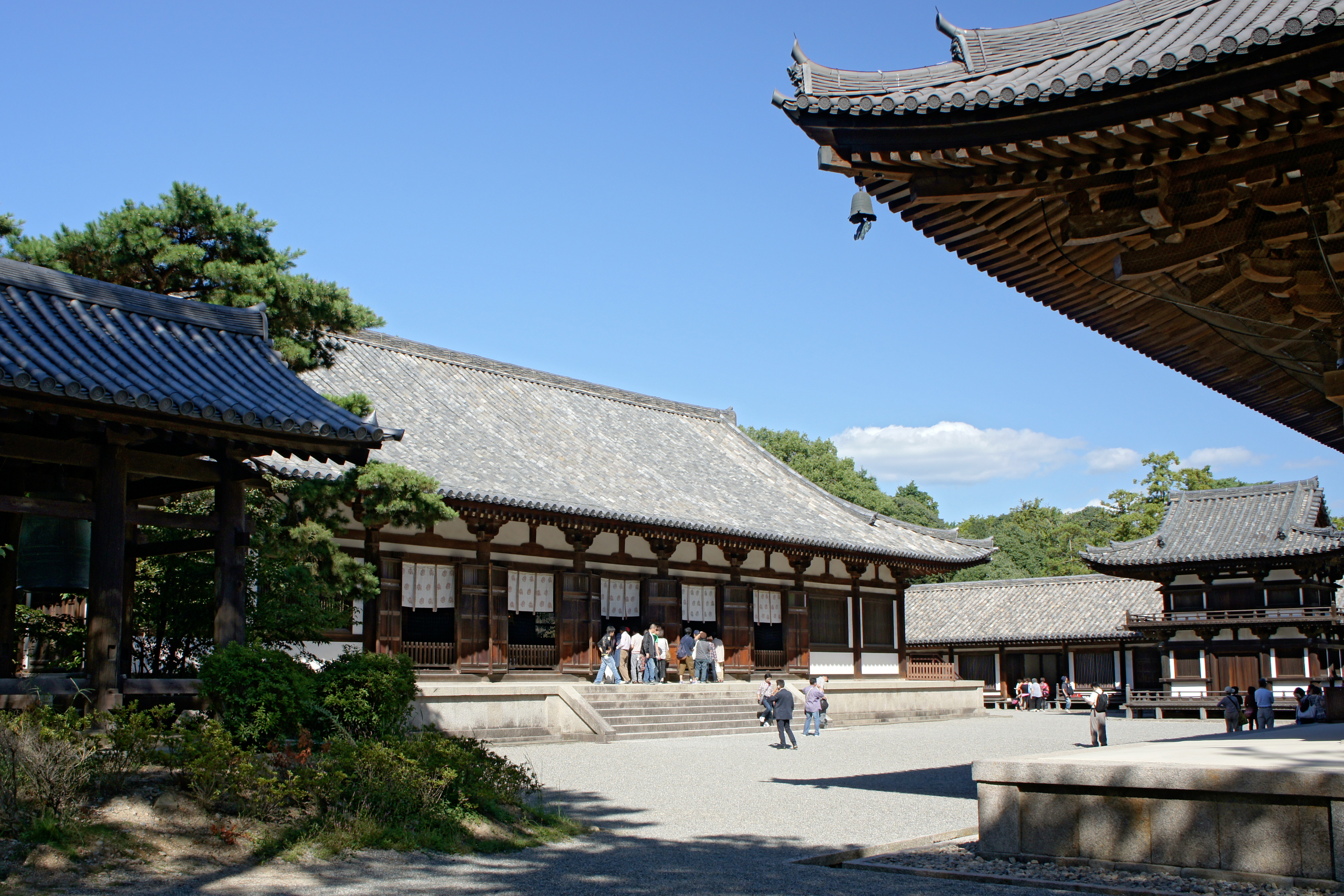
Tōshōdai-ji in Nara

Risshū (律宗), also Ritsu-shu, is one of the six schools of Nara Buddhism in Japan, noted for its use of the Vinaya textual framework of the Dharmaguptaka, one of the early schools of Buddhism; Risshū is the Japanese term for Vinaya.

The Ritsu school was formally established in China during the Tang dynasty by Daoxuan, founder of the Nanshan Vinaya school. Daoxuan completed the scholastic system of Vinaya studies with his Commentary on the Four-Part Vinaya (四分律行事鈔). He belonged to the lineage of Huiguang (468–537), a disciple of the Dilun school, and trained prominent monks such as Wengang, Zhuxiu, Daoshi, and Hongjing.

The school was transmitted to Japan by the blind Chinese priest Jianzhen, better known by his Japanese name Ganjin, in 753 after multiple failed voyages. At the request of Japanese monks, he brought the Four-Part Vinaya (四分律 (Shibunritsu)), establishing an ordination platform at Tōdai-ji where he ordained the Retired Emperor Shōmu and Empress Kōken, among others. He later founded Tōshōdai-ji in Nara, which became the head temple of the sect.

== History ==
Although the Vinaya had been introduced to Japan at an early stage, the teachings were fragmentary and understood only within a few temples. Formal ordination ceremonies were not conducted until the arrival of Jianzhen (Ganjin), whose transmission marked the first full ordinations in Japan. He re-ordained monks who had previously received what were considered unorthodox initiations.

During the Heian period, however, leading figures such as Saichō and Kūkai did not support the Risshū. Saichō established an independent ordination platform at Enryaku-ji, while Kūkai emphasized the Shisong lü (十誦律, "Ten Recitations Vinaya") but still conducted ordinations at Tōdai-ji. This diversity of approaches led to fragmentation, and over time ordination came to be regarded more as a bureaucratic step for becoming an official monk rather than a meaningful spiritual practice.

From the late Heian into the Kamakura period, reform-minded monks such as Jitsuhan and Myōe called for a revival of the Vinaya. In 1236, Kakujō, Yūgon, Ensei, and Eison carried out self-ordination ceremonies independent of state control. Kakujō restored Tōshōdai-ji as a center of the Risshū, while Eison founded the Shingon Risshu at Saidai-ji, drawing on the Shisong lü. Around the same time, Shunjō of Sennyū-ji returned from the Southern Song dynasty with a new Vinaya lineage, later known as the "Beijing Vinaya."

These developments gave rise to three coexisting branches: the Tōshōdai-ji lineage, the Saidai-ji Shingon Vinaya, and Shunjō's Beijing Vinaya. Collectively referred to as the "New Vinaya" (新義律), they were distinguished from the older tradition, or "Old Vinaya" (古義律). Through their debates and exchanges, Vinaya practice in Japan deepened and gained new vitality. In the medieval period, the combination of Zen and Vinaya practice, known as "Zen-Vinaya" (禅律), was held in high regard. Yet during the Muromachi period, the Risshū once again declined under the dominance of Zen Buddhism. In the Edo period, however, monks such as Meinin, Yūson, Keiun Ryōkai, Tokumon Fujaku, and Shinshun spearheaded renewed efforts to restore the Vinaya.

In the early Meiji period, government reforms absorbed most Risshū temples into Shingon Buddhism, with the sole exception of Tōshōdai-ji, which resisted incorporation. In 1900 (Meiji 33), the Risshū regained recognition as an independent sect. Today, Tōshōdai-ji continues to serve as the head temple of the tradition.

== Views ==
The Risshū emphasized the primacy of the Vinaya and rejected Tendai interpretations that subordinated monastic precepts to the Lotus Sutra.

== See also ==
- Buddhism in Japan
- Dharmaguptaka
- Schools of Buddhism
- Vinaya
