= Xie Mian =

- 谢冕
- Born: January 6, 1932 (age 94); Fuzhou, Fujian, China
- Education: Peking University
- Occupations: Professor at Peking University (1960-present), Novelist
- Writing career
- Language: Chinese
- Notable works: 《湖岸诗评》 《共和国的星光》 《文学的绿色革命》 《新世纪的太阳》 《大转型——后新时期文化研究》（合著） 《1898 ：百年忧患》 《论二十世纪中国文学》

Xie Mian (Chinese: 谢冕; born 6 January 1932) is a contemporary Chinese writer and literary scholar based in Beijing. His piece "People that Read are Happy People" included in his 1997 book Eternal Campus (永远的校园) and originally published in the July 19, 1995 edition of the China Reader's Report (中华读书报) is one of the potential reading selections for Putonghua Proficiency Test test-takers.
