= Liu Hsia =

Taiwanese writer

Liu Hsia (Chinese: 劉俠; pinyin: Liú Xiá; 28 February 1942 – 8 February 2003), better known by her pen name Hsinglintzu (Chinese: 杏林子; pinyin: Xìnglínzǐ), was a Taiwanese writer.

== Early life and education ==
She was born in Fufeng, Shaanxi on 28 February 1942, and later moved to Taiwan, attending elementary school in Beitou. Liu was diagnosed with atrophic arthritis, a form of rheumatoid arthritis, in 1954, aged 12. Her condition ended her formal education and required the use of a wheelchair. Aged 16, Liu converted to Christianity.

== Career ==
In the early 1970s, Liu spent two years as a volunteer with two organizations, both working with the disabled. In 1982, Liu founded the Eden Social Welfare Foundation with NT$200,000 she had won as one of ten "outstanding young women" of 1980. The organization was named after the Garden of Eden, as Liu's goal was to create a paradise for the disabled. Though she worked with six fellow Christians as cofounders, Liu was regarded as the "spiritual leader" of the organization. For her activism, Liu was later awarded the Wu San-lien Award for social service.

Liu launched a symbolic campaign for the Legislative Yuan in 1989, though electoral law required candidates to have completed a high school education. Liu became a national policy adviser to President Chen Shui-bian in May 2001.

Liu died of atrial flutter on 8 February 2003, at Tri-Service General Hospital. She had been dragged from her bed at home by her Indonesian caregiver, Vinarsih, resulting in broken bones and bruises. Vinarsih claimed to have dreamed of Liu's late father, who told Vinarsih to help Liu because there was an earthquake. Vinarsih was later diagnosed with a mental disorder. The incident led a group of social welfare organizations to petition for labor protections on behalf of foreign caregivers.

== Pen name ==
Liu Hsia is best known by her pen name, Hsinglintzu, Chinese: 杏林子, literally "Child of the apricot forest", this is both an allusion to her birthplace of Xinglin Town (杏林, literally: Apricot Forest) in Fufeng County, Shaanxi province, China; and an allusion to a lifetime spent in and out of hospitals. "People of the apricot forest" (Chinese: 杏林中人) is a traditional Chinese epithet for physicians; especially for skilled ones. The epithet derives from the life of Eastern Han physician Dong Feng.
