= Liu Yong (painter) =

Taiwanese-American educator (born 1949)

Liu Yong 劉墉
- Born: February 1949 (age 77)
- Education: National Taiwan Normal University (BFA); St. John's University (MA); Columbia University (PhD)
- Occupations: Educator, novelist, painter, philanthropist
- Spouse: Bi Wei Wei
- Children: Liu Shiuan(1972—) and Liu Yvonne(1989—)

Liu Yong (born in February 1949), is a Taiwanese-American educator and author who founded the Shui Yun Zhai Cultural Enterprise and funded the construction of over 40 schools in rural China.

Liu's books have been translated into languages including English, Korean, Vietnamese, and Thai. His works are used in school textbooks in mainland China and Taiwan. He has lectured on educational topics in China, Taiwan, Malaysia, and Singapore. A chapter from one of Liu's books for adolescents is a potential topic for the reading-aloud test on the Putonghua Proficiency Test.

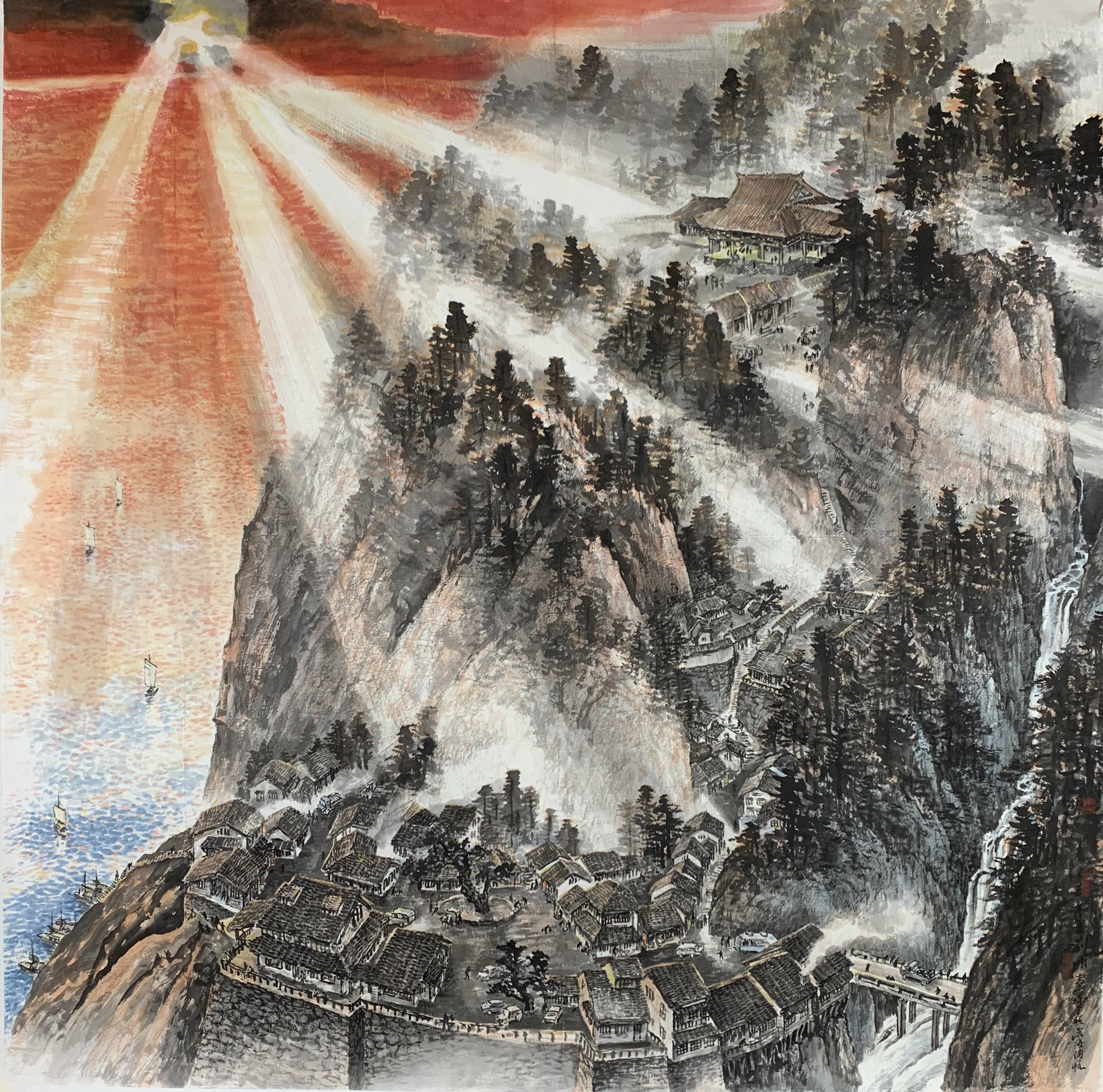
The Setting Sun Shines on the Mountain Village (2019)

== Early life and career ==
Liu Yong was born and raised in Taipei. His father died when he was nine years old, and his house burned down when he was thirteen years old. He later graduated from Cheng Kung Senior High School. He attended National Taiwan Normal University and obtained a bachelor's degree in fine arts in 1972.

As an undergraduate, Liu won first place in the fine arts department exhibition at National Taiwan Normal University. Upon graduating in 1972, he became an art teacher at Cheng Kung Senior High School. He was invited to participate in the Asia Contemporary Art Exhibition at age 23, and the National Art Exhibition at age 25.

From November 30, 1971, to April 5, 1974, Liu hosted the China Television quiz show "Seconds Count Down". From 1973 to 1977, he worked as a reporter and producer for China Television in Taipei.

In 1978, Liu represented China Television in the U.S. and became the artist-in-residence at the Danville Museum of Fine Arts and History in Virginia. In 1980, he became the artist-in-residence at St. John's University in New York. In 1991, Liu was commissioned by Taiwan's public television station to produce the documentary series, “The Spirit of Chinese Culture”. At the same time, he founded Shui Yun Zhai Cultural Enterprises in Taipei, which he continues to manage as a writer and artist.

Liu lives and works in New York and Taipei. His works can be found in the collection of Zhejiang Art Museum and the Liaoning Provincial Museum, in China. Other collections can be found in the Museum für Ostasiatische Kunst, in Germany.

== Artistic style ==
Liu Yong was apprenticed to Huang Jun-Bi and Lin Yushan, artists known for landscape, bird, and flower paintings. Liu imitated classical masterpieces at the National Palace Museum. This foundation, combined with his Western painting education from studying in the U.S., sketching technique, and background in literature, led to the development of his style.

His style merges his self-invented technique of spraying ink onto wrinkled paper collages, the boneless strokes of bird and flower painting, texture strokes inspired by old Chinese masters, and a form of Pointillism inspired by Impressionism.

Furthermore, Young, having lost his father at age 9 and his house in a fire at age 13, is profoundly inspired by his childhood and implements it in his works. He most frequently paints nighttime scenery.

Liu's work has been included in auctions at Sotheby's and Christie's in Hong Kong, Beijing, China, and New York.

== Selected solo exhibitions ==
- 2019: Baoku Jiangxin Art Center, Shanghai, China
- 2018: Liaoning Provincial Museum, Shenyang, China
- 2017: Zhejiang Art Museum, Hangzhou, China
- 2015: Art Museum of Beijing Fine Art Academy, Beijing, China
- 2015: Silicon Valley Asian Art Center, Santa Clara, CA
- 2011: Gallery at National Dr. Sun Yat-Sen Memorial Hall, Taipei, Taiwan
- 2010: Xi Zhi Tang Gallery, Taipei, Taiwan
- 1990: Taipei Arts Center, Taipei, Taiwan
- 1989: Xin Sheng Gallery, Taipei, Taiwan
- 1982: Long-Men Gallery, Taipei, Taiwan
- 1982: Today Gallery, Taipei, Taiwan
- 1981: Chung-Cheng Art Gallery at St. John's University, Queens, NY
- 1980: Print Gallery, Blacksburg, VA
- 1979: Washington and Lee University Gallery, Lexington, VA
- 1978: Danville Museum of Fine Arts and History, Danville, VA
- 1978: Rechenbach's Gallery, Knoxville, TN
- 1978: People's Market Art Gallery, Greenville, SC
- 1978: Mall Art Gallery, Norfolk, VA
- 1978: Quayside Gallery, Norfolk, VA
- 1977: National Taiwan Museum, Taipei, Taiwan

== Selected group exhibitions ==
- 2021: Commemorating Dwelling in the Fuchun Mountains, Gongwang Art Museum, Hangzhou, China
- 2021: When Literature Meets Aesthetics, Chang Ge Gallery, Taipei, Taiwan
- 2021: Welcoming Spring, Chang Ge Gallery, Taipei, Taiwan
- 2019: Cross-Strait Art Exhibition, Chiang Kai-shek Memorial Hall, Taipei, Taiwan
- 2016: Chinese Contemporary Famous Artists, Silicon Valley Asian Art Center, Santa Clara, CA
- 2016: 100 Years of Chinese Art, Shandong Art Museum, Jinan, China
- 2014: Asia-Pacific Economic Cooperation (APEC), International Conference Center, Beijing, China
- 2013: The Pacific—Innovation of Chinese Ink Paintings in America, Zhejiang Art Museum, Hangzhou, China
- 2013: Beautiful Taiwan—Classic Works of Taiwan's Contemporary Artists, National Art Museum of China, Beijing, China
- 2013: Beautiful Taiwan—Classic Works of Taiwan's Contemporary Artists, China Art Museum, Shanghai, China
- 2011: 100 Years 100 Paintings—Taiwanese Contemporary Artists Exhibition, General Association of Chinese Culture, Taipei, Taiwan
- 2009: Open Flexibility—Innovative Contemporary Ink Art, Taipei Fine Arts Museum, Taipei, Taiwan
- 2007: The Third Chengdu Biennale: New Trend of Contemporary Ink Painting—Ink Works from Taiwan, Chengdu Contemporary Art Museum, Chengdu, China
- 1993: Chinese Modern Colour-and-Ink Painting Exhibition, Russian Museum of Ethnography, St. Petersburg, Russia
- 1993: Great Contemporary Art Exhibition, Gallery at National Chiang Kai-Shek Memorial Hall, Taipei, Taiwan
- 1986: 21st Annual Sumi-e Society of America Exhibition, Salmagundi Club, New York, NY
- 1984: Overseas Chinese Artists, Taipei Fine Arts Museum, Taipei, Taiwan
- 1978: Chinese Paintings, Museum für Ostasiatische Kunst, Cologne, Germany
- 1977: Chinese Modern Art Exhibition, Museum of Science and Industry, Los Angeles, CA

== Selected public and private collections ==
- Chiang Kai-shek Memorial Hall, Taipei, Taiwan ROC
- Knoxville City Hall, Knoxville, Tennessee, USA
- Liaoning Provincial Museum, Shenyang, China
- Museum für Ostasiatische Kunst, Cologne, Germany
- National Museum of History, Taipei, Taiwan ROC
- National Taiwan Museum of Fine Arts, Taichung, Taiwan ROC
- Sun Yat-sen Memorial Hall (Taipei), Taipei, Taiwan ROC
- Washington and Lee University, Lexington, Virginia, USA
- Zhejiang Art Museum, Hangzhou, China
- Stanley Ho Family Collection
- Liu Yiqian, China

== TV shows ==
- China Television quiz show "Seconds Count Down" (Show time: November 30, 1971 ~ April 5, 1974)
- China Television politics show "Current Event Forum" (1976), received the Golden Bell Award of TV
- China Television cultural show "Window of Music" (1976), won Best Music Program at the International Film and Television Festival in New York
- Phoenix Television talk show "Speaking of the World from the Heart" (2008)
- Taiwan Public Television educational show "Chinese Characters Are Fun" (2015)

== See also ==
- Taiwanese art
- Culture of Taiwan
- Fine art
