= Fengtai County =

Coordinates: 32.7018°N 116.713°E

Fengtai 凤台县
- County
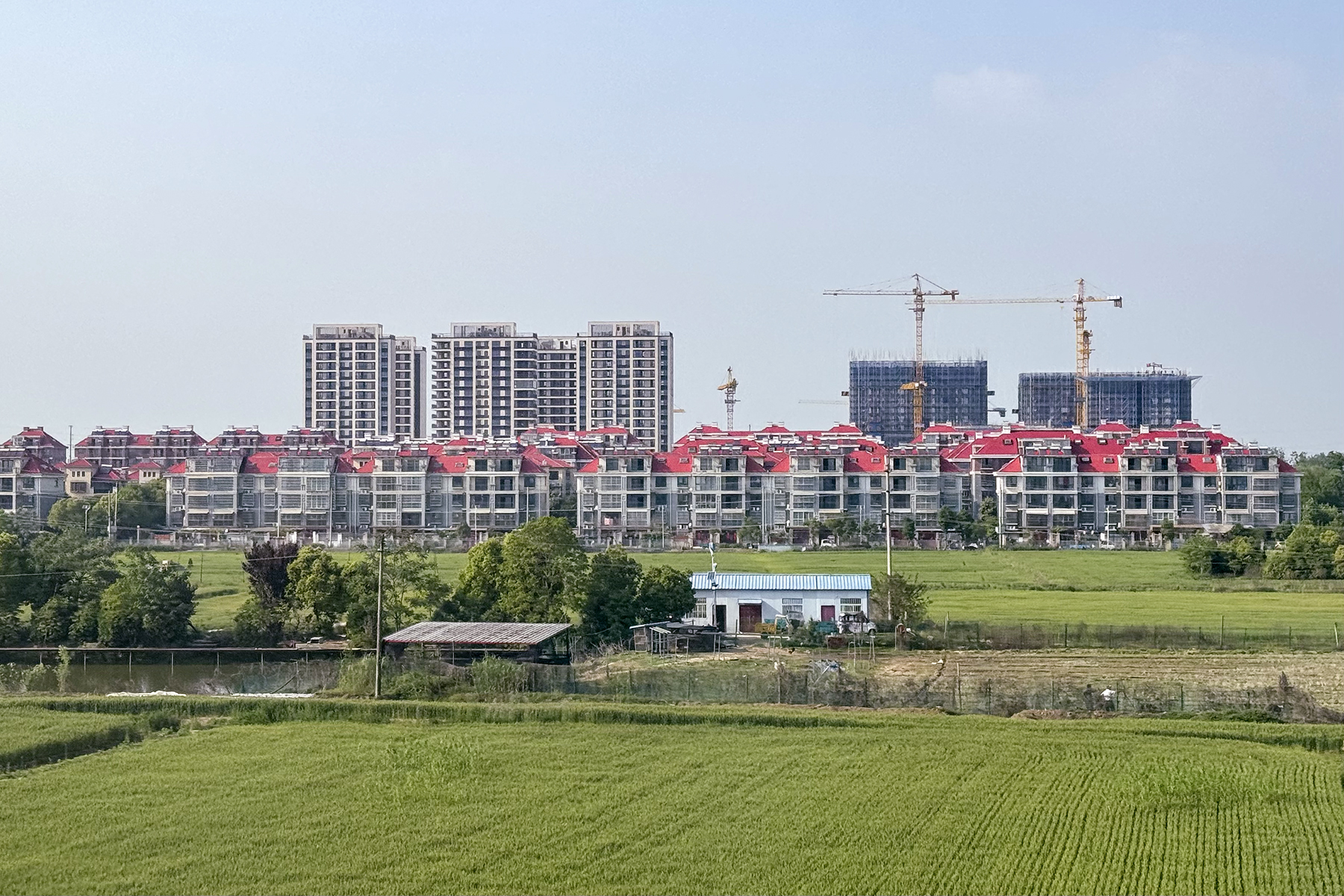
- Maoji, Fengtai County
- Interactive map of Fengtai
- Country: China
- Province: Anhui
- Prefecture-level city: Huainan
- County seat: Fenghuang

Area
  - Total: 894 km^{2} (345 sq mi)

Population (2020)
  - Total: 633,385
  - Density: 708/km^{2} (1,830/sq mi)
- Time zone: UTC+8 (China Standard)
- Postal code: 232100

Fengtai County (simplified Chinese: 凤台县; traditional Chinese: 鳳台縣; pinyin: Fèngtái Xiàn; lit. 'phoenix platform') is a county in the north of Anhui Province, China. It is under the administration of Huainan city. Author Li Hengrui (李恒瑞), whose work "Kite Capriccio" (風箏暢想曲) describes life as a child in the 1950s in Fengtai County is included in the Putonghua Proficiency Test.

== Administrative divisions ==
In the present, Fengtai County has 15 towns, 3 townships and 1 ethnic township.

10 Towns

- Chengguan (城关镇)
- Xinji (新集镇)
- Zhumadian (朱马店镇)
- Yuezhangji (岳张集镇)
- Guqiao (顾桥镇)
- Maoji (毛集镇)
- Xiaji (夏集镇)
- Guiji (桂集镇)
- Jiaoganghu (焦岗湖镇)
- Fenghuang (凤凰镇)
- Yangcun (杨村镇)
- Dingji (丁集镇)
- Liuji (刘集镇)
- Daxing (大兴镇)

3 Townships

- Gudian (古店乡)
- Qianmiao (钱庙乡)
- Guandian (关店乡)
- Shangtang (尚塘乡)

1 Ethnic township

- Lichong Hui Ethnic Township (李冲回族乡)

== Climate ==
Climate data for Fengtai, elevation 23 m (75 ft), (1991–2020 normals, extremes 1981–present)
Month	Jan	Feb	Mar	Apr	May	Jun	Jul	Aug	Sep	Oct	Nov	Dec	Year
Record high °C (°F)	20.5 (68.9)	27.3 (81.1)	34.9 (94.8)	34.1 (93.4)	37.3 (99.1)	39.1 (102.4)	40.1 (104.2)	37.7 (99.9)	37.6 (99.7)	33.3 (91.9)	29.0 (84.2)	22.4 (72.3)	40.1 (104.2)
Mean daily maximum °C (°F)	6.7 (44.1)	9.8 (49.6)	15.2 (59.4)	21.7 (71.1)	27.1 (80.8)	30.4 (86.7)	32.0 (89.6)	31.1 (88.0)	27.4 (81.3)	22.5 (72.5)	15.7 (60.3)	9.0 (48.2)	20.7 (69.3)
Daily mean °C (°F)	2.3 (36.1)	5.1 (41.2)	10.1 (50.2)	16.4 (61.5)	21.9 (71.4)	25.9 (78.6)	28.2 (82.8)	27.2 (81.0)	22.8 (73.0)	17.3 (63.1)	10.7 (51.3)	4.5 (40.1)	16.0 (60.9)
Mean daily minimum °C (°F)	−1.1 (30.0)	1.4 (34.5)	5.9 (42.6)	11.7 (53.1)	17.2 (63.0)	21.8 (71.2)	25.0 (77.0)	24.1 (75.4)	19.3 (66.7)	13.3 (55.9)	6.8 (44.2)	1.0 (33.8)	12.2 (54.0)
Record low °C (°F)	−15.5 (4.1)	−13.3 (8.1)	−5.0 (23.0)	0.1 (32.2)	5.0 (41.0)	12.2 (54.0)	18.1 (64.6)	14.9 (58.8)	9.6 (49.3)	1.0 (33.8)	−8.1 (17.4)	−16.8 (1.8)	−16.8 (1.8)
Average precipitation mm (inches)	33.5 (1.32)	37.3 (1.47)	58.1 (2.29)	56.0 (2.20)	79.3 (3.12)	164.2 (6.46)	209.4 (8.24)	135.8 (5.35)	77.9 (3.07)	50.4 (1.98)	41.7 (1.64)	23.8 (0.94)	967.4 (38.08)
Average precipitation days (≥ 0.1 mm)	7.0	7.9	8.5	7.8	9.2	9.3	12.0	11.9	8.4	7.4	7.9	6.0	103.3
Average snowy days	4.5	2.5	1.2	0	0	0	0	0	0	0	0.7	1.4	10.3
Average relative humidity (%)	71	71	67	68	68	72	80	82	79	73	72	70	73
Mean monthly sunshine hours	121.7	121.6	159.7	189.7	196.4	171.8	186.3	178.2	157.5	151.9	145.7	135.3	1,915.8
Percentage possible sunshine	38	39	43	49	46	40	43	44	43	44	47	44	43
Source: China Meteorological Administration
