= Fufeng County =

Fufeng County 扶风县
- County
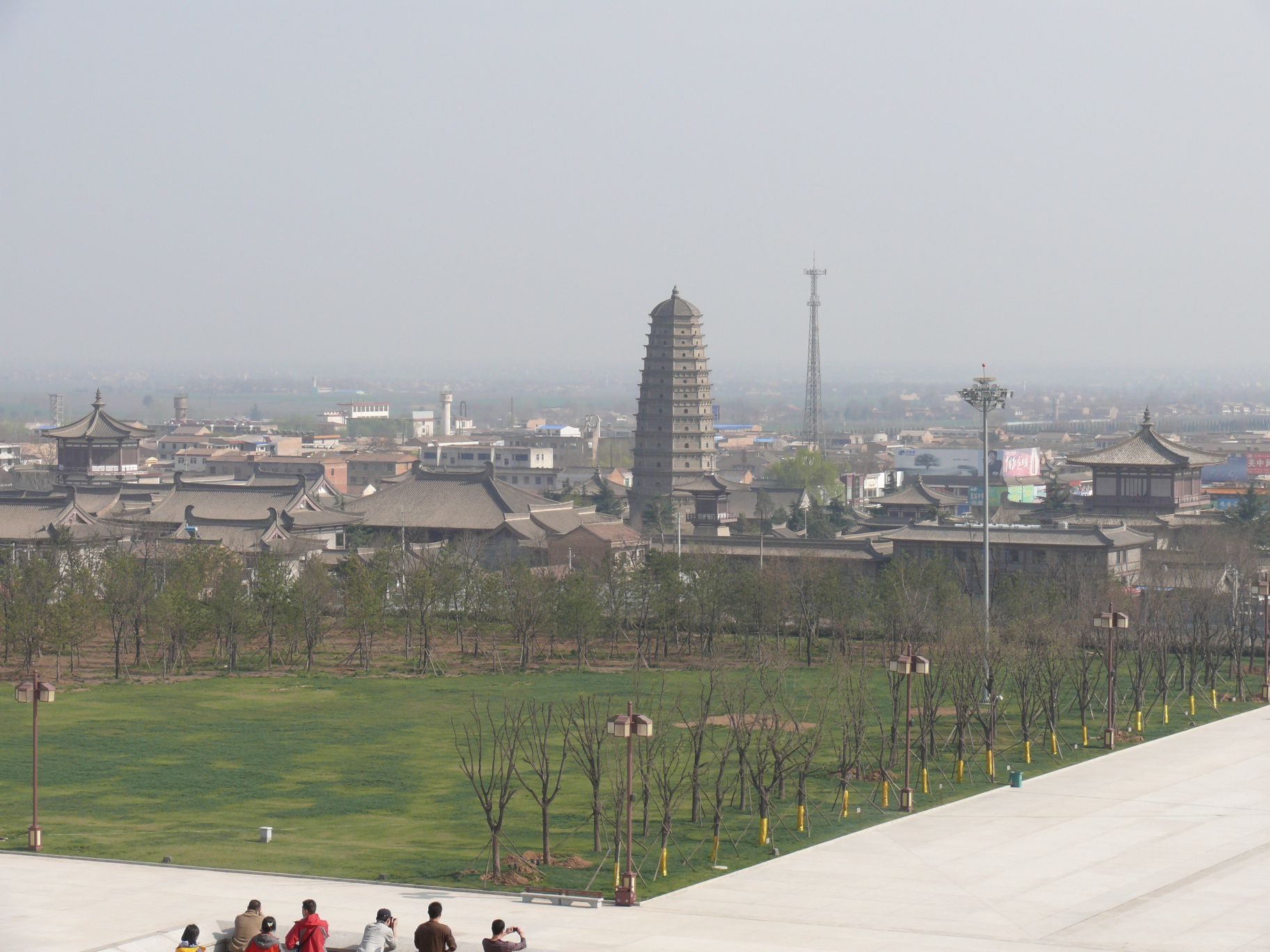
- The township of Famen, with the Famen Temple and its pagoda in the center, the latter rebuilt during the Ming dynasty

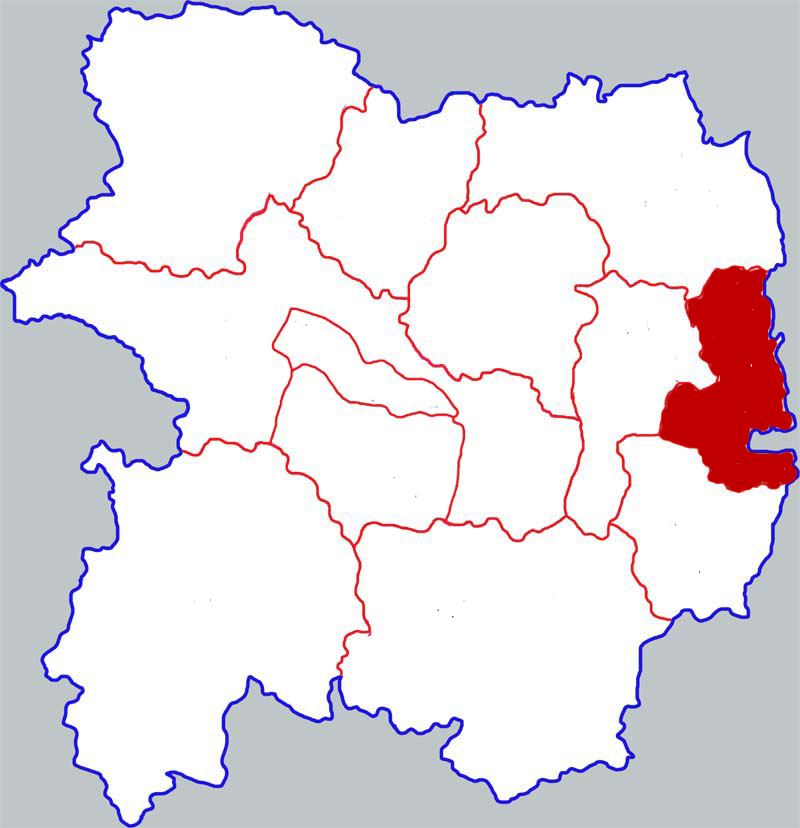
- Fufeng in Baoji

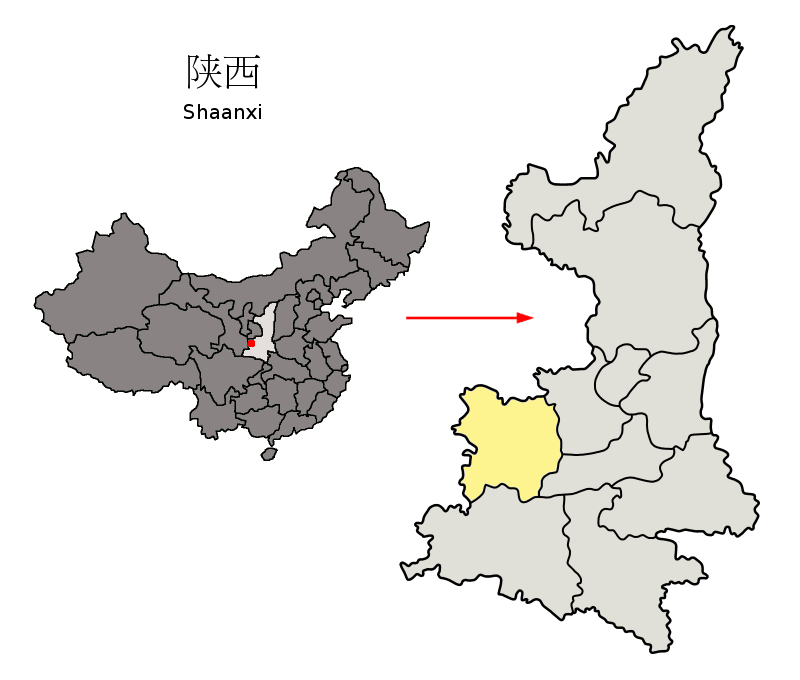
- Baoji in Shaanxi
- Coordinates: 34°22′32″N 107°54′01″E
- Country: People's Republic of China
- Province: Shaanxi
- Prefecture-level city: Baoji
- Time zone: UTC+8 (China Standard)
- Website: www.fufeng.gov.cn

Fufeng County (simplified Chinese: 扶风县; traditional Chinese: 扶風縣; pinyin: Fúfēng Xiàn) is a county under the administration of the prefecture-level city of Baoji, in the west-central part of Shaanxi Province, China. The county lies in the fertile Guanzhong Plain on the north bank of the Wei River between Xi'an, 110 km (68 mi) to the east, and Baoji, 95 km (59 mi) to the west. It has a land area of 751 km^{2} (290 sq mi), and a population of 450,000 as of 2021.

The township of Famen contains the Famen Temple and Zhouyuan Museum (in Zhaochen Village). The Zhouyuan Museum covers archeological excavations of bronzeware from the Zhou dynasty which were discovered nearby. A Zhou dynasty capital was located here during the late 11th century. Nowadays Fufeng is mostly reliant on agriculture.

== Administrative divisions ==
As of 2019, Fufeng county is divided into 1 subdistrict and 7 towns.

Subdistricts

- Chengguan (城关街道),

Towns

- Tiandu (天度镇), Wujing (午井镇), Jiangzhang (绛帐镇), Duanjia (段家镇), Xinglin (杏林镇), Shaogong (召公镇), Famen (法门镇)

== Climate ==
Climate data for Fufeng, elevation 586 m (1,923 ft), (1991–2020 normals, extremes 1981–2010)
Month	Jan	Feb	Mar	Apr	May	Jun	Jul	Aug	Sep	Oct	Nov	Dec	Year
Record high °C (°F)	18.1 (64.6)	23.6 (74.5)	29.0 (84.2)	34.8 (94.6)	37.0 (98.6)	41.2 (106.2)	40.2 (104.4)	38.8 (101.8)	38.1 (100.6)	31.5 (88.7)	25.3 (77.5)	22.4 (72.3)	41.2 (106.2)
Mean daily maximum °C (°F)	5.1 (41.2)	9.1 (48.4)	14.8 (58.6)	21.2 (70.2)	26.0 (78.8)	30.9 (87.6)	31.9 (89.4)	29.5 (85.1)	24.4 (75.9)	18.8 (65.8)	12.5 (54.5)	6.7 (44.1)	19.2 (66.6)
Daily mean °C (°F)	−0.7 (30.7)	3.0 (37.4)	8.5 (47.3)	14.5 (58.1)	19.3 (66.7)	24.3 (75.7)	26.3 (79.3)	24.3 (75.7)	19.3 (66.7)	13.3 (55.9)	6.6 (43.9)	0.8 (33.4)	13.3 (55.9)
Mean daily minimum °C (°F)	−5.0 (23.0)	−1.7 (28.9)	3.4 (38.1)	8.7 (47.7)	13.4 (56.1)	18.4 (65.1)	21.4 (70.5)	20.3 (68.5)	15.4 (59.7)	9.3 (48.7)	2.2 (36.0)	−3.5 (25.7)	8.5 (47.3)
Record low °C (°F)	−13.9 (7.0)	−12.7 (9.1)	−9.0 (15.8)	−1.8 (28.8)	1.6 (34.9)	8.6 (47.5)	13.9 (57.0)	11.5 (52.7)	5.8 (42.4)	−4.4 (24.1)	−8.5 (16.7)	−21.5 (−6.7)	−21.5 (−6.7)
Average precipitation mm (inches)	6.1 (0.24)	9.1 (0.36)	23.6 (0.93)	40.1 (1.58)	52.4 (2.06)	66.0 (2.60)	81.4 (3.20)	103.2 (4.06)	100.3 (3.95)	54.7 (2.15)	18.8 (0.74)	3.4 (0.13)	559.1 (22)
Average precipitation days (≥ 0.1 mm)	3.8	4.3	6.6	7.1	9.4	9.0	9.9	10.4	12.3	10.4	5.7	2.9	91.8
Average snowy days	4.4	3.6	1.6	0.1	0	0	0	0	0	0	1.2	2.5	13.4
Average relative humidity (%)	64	65	65	67	68	65	72	79	82	80	75	67	71
Mean monthly sunshine hours	143.1	134.7	166.6	192.3	210.6	204.5	203.7	168.0	130.2	130.3	142.1	148.1	1,974.2
Percentage possible sunshine	45	43	45	49	49	47	47	41	35	38	46	48	44
Source: China Meteorological Administration

== Culture ==
Fufeng is known for its vinegar made from grains, which is produced by local rural households. It is also known for a dish combining Douhua and Paomo.
