= Jianzhen =

Chinese monk who spread Buddhism in Japan

- 鑒真
- Japanese sculpture of Jianzhen in Tōshōdai-ji temple. Nara period, 8th century AD.

Personal life
- Born: Chunyu (first name unknown); 688 Yangzhou, Jiangsu, China
- Died: 763 (aged 74–75) Tōshōdai-ji, Nara Prefecture, Japan

Religious life
- Religion: Buddhism
- Temple: Daming Temple; Tōshōdai-ji
- School: Risshū
- Lineage: 3rd generation
- Dharma name: Jianzhen

Senior posting
- Teacher: Zhiman (智滿); Dao'an (道岸)
- Students: Xiangyan (祥彥) Daoxing (道興) Situo (思托) Fajin (法進)

Jianzhen
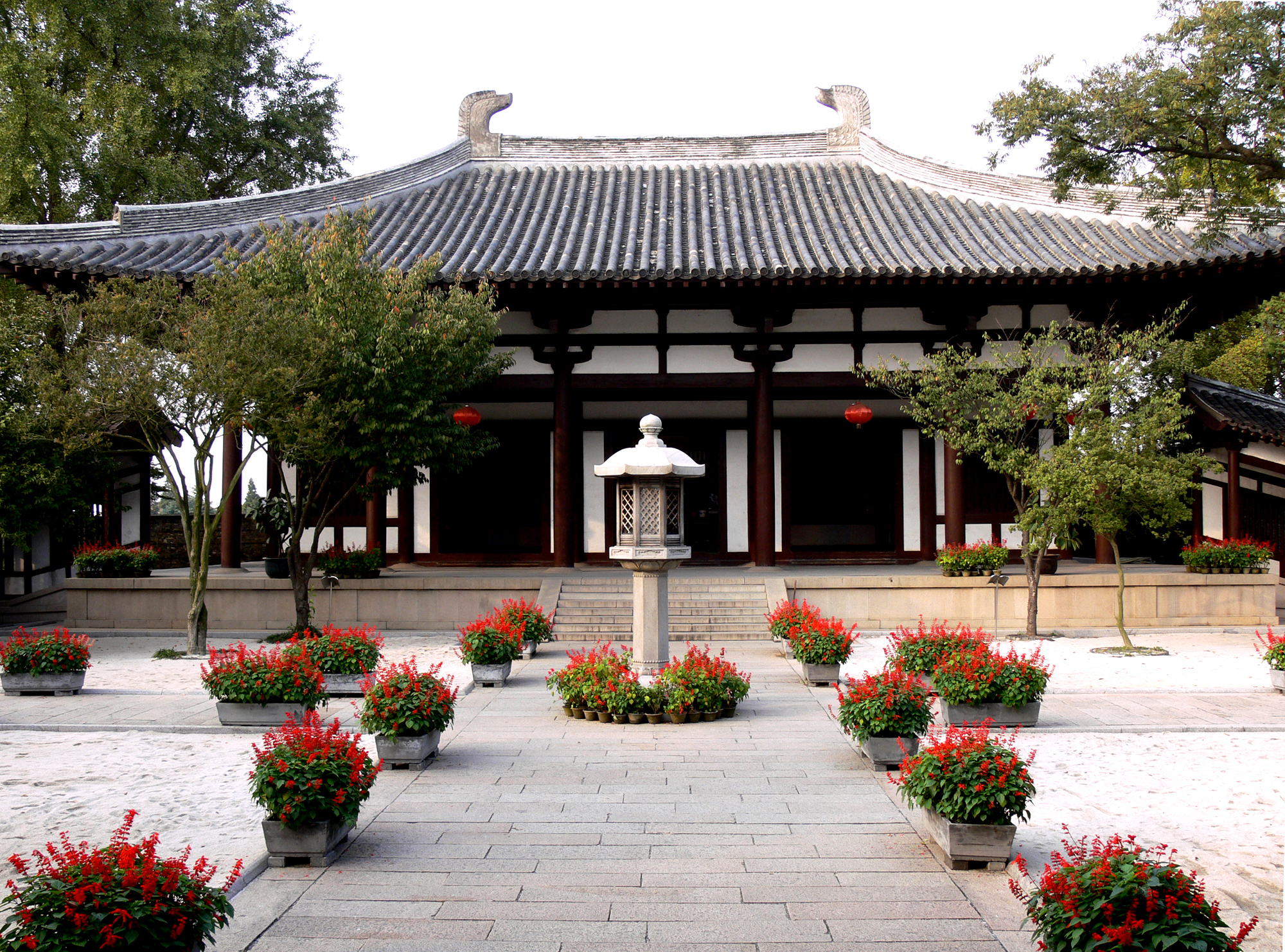
- Jianzhen Monk Memorial Hall, Daming Temple in Yangzhou, China

Chinese name
- Traditional Chinese: 鑒真
- Simplified Chinese: 鉴真
Transcriptions
Standard Mandarin
- Hanyu Pinyin: Jiànzhēn
- Wade–Giles: Chien-chen
- IPA: [tɕjɛ̂n.ʈʂə́n]
Yue: Cantonese
- Yale Romanization: Gaamjān
- Jyutping: Gaam3-zan1
- IPA: [kam˧.tsɐn˥]

Ganjin
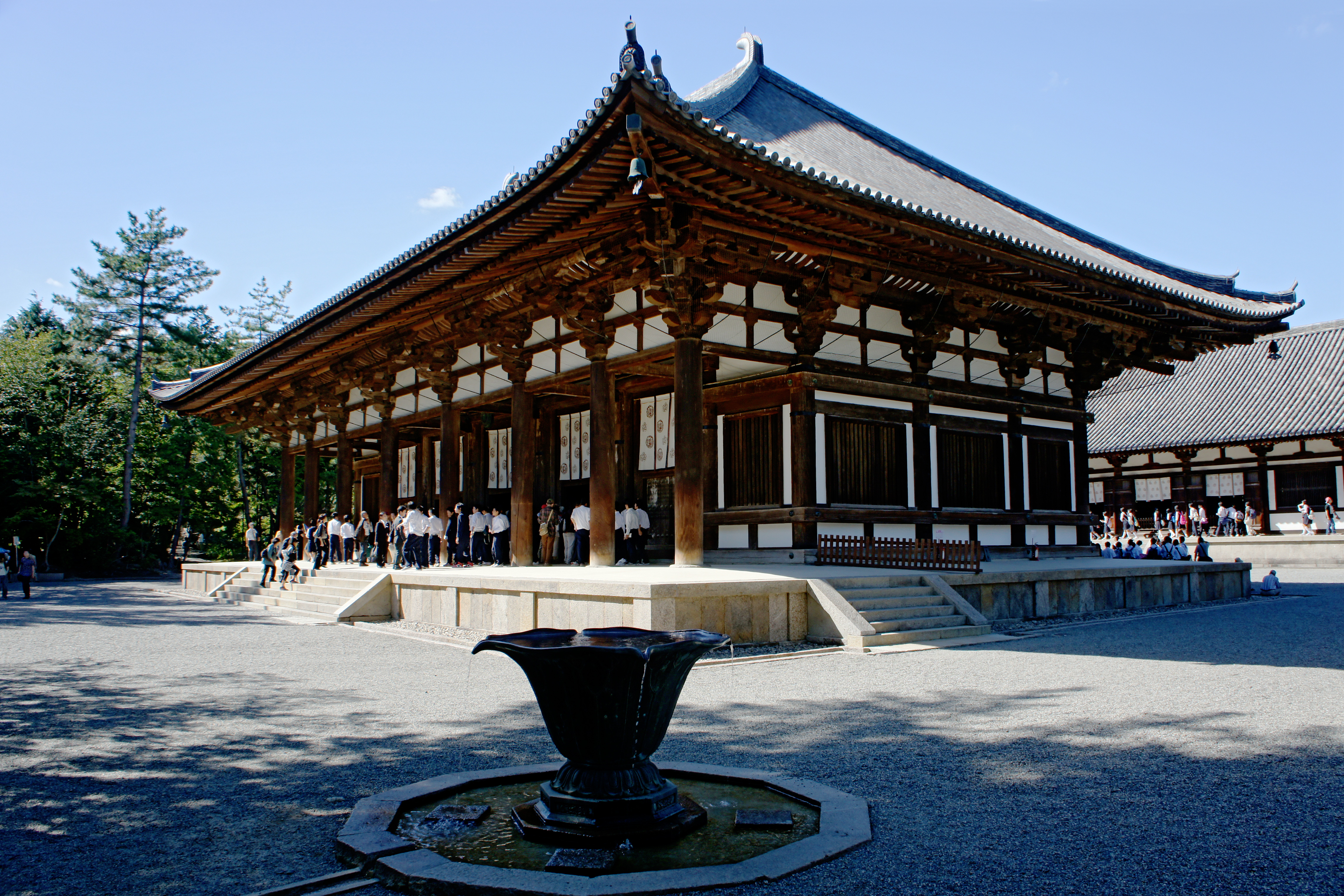
- Golden Hall of Tōshōdai-ji in Nara, Japan

Japanese name
- Kanji: 鑑真
Transcriptions
- Romanization: Ganjin

Jianzhen (688–763), also known by his Japanese name Ganjin (Japanese pronunciation: [ɡaꜜɲ.dʑiɴ]), was a Tang Chinese monk who helped to propagate Buddhism in Japan. In the eleven years from 743 to 754, Jianzhen attempted to visit Japan some six times, arriving in the year 753 and founding Tōshōdai-ji in Nara. When he finally succeeded on his sixth attempt, he had lost his eyesight as a result of an infection acquired during his journeys, although Fukushima Giichi, a Japanese expert in the history of ophthalmology, suggested that he may have suffered from age related cataracts. Jianzhen's life story and voyage are described in the scroll, "The Sea Journey to the East of a Great Bonze from the Tang Dynasty."

== Life ==
Jianzhen was born in Jiangyin county in Guangling Prefecture (present day Yangzhou), China, with the surname of Chunyu (淳于). At the age of fourteen, he became a disciple of Dayun Temple (大云寺). At twenty he travelled to Chang'an for study and returned six years later, eventually becoming abbot of Daming Temple. Besides his learning in the Tripiṭaka, Jianzhen is also said to have been an expert in medicine. He opened the Buddhist temple as a place of healing, creating the Beitian Court (悲田院)—a hospital within Daming Temple.

In autumn 742, an emissary from Japan invited Jianzhen to lecture in Japan. Despite protests from his disciples, Jianzhen made preparations and in spring 743 was ready for the long voyage across the East China Sea to Japan. The crossing failed and in the following years, Jianzhen made three more attempts but was thwarted by unfavourable conditions or government intervention.

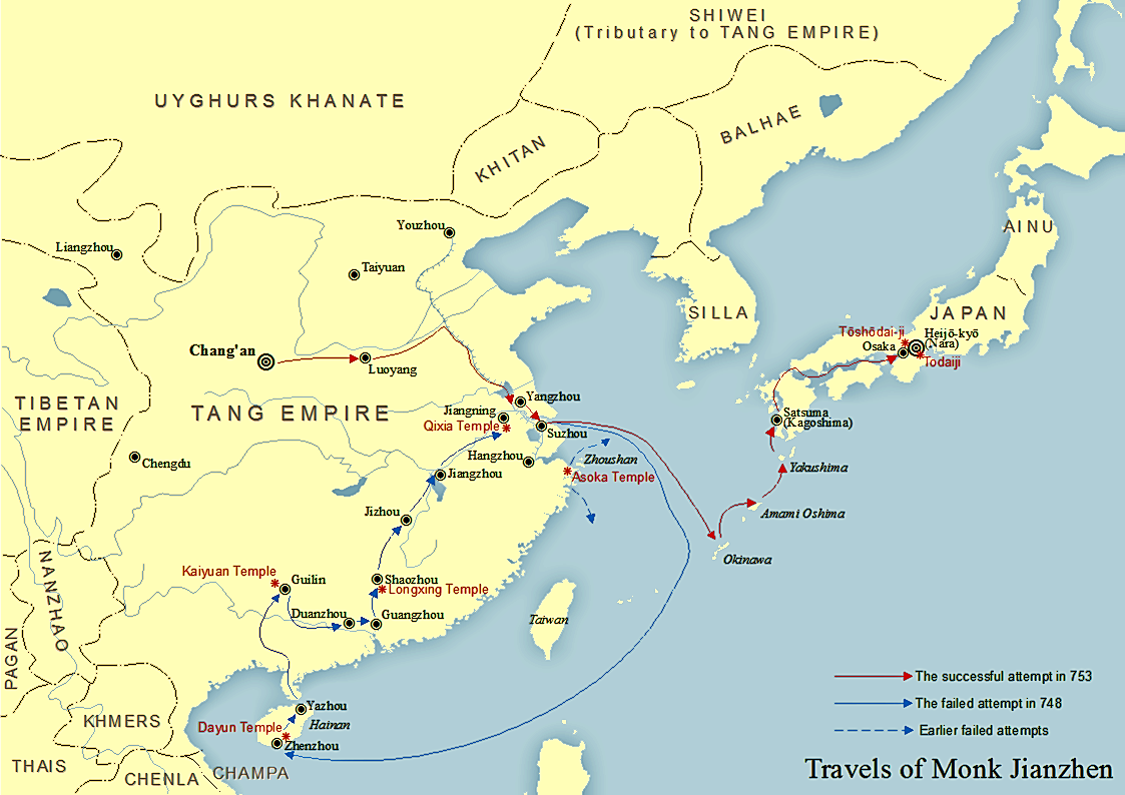
Map of Jianzhen's travels

In summer 748, Jianzhen made his fifth attempt to reach Japan. Leaving from Yangzhou, he made it to the Zhoushan Archipelago off the coast of modern Zhejiang. But the ship was blown off course and ended up in the Yande (延德) commandery on Hainan Island. Jianzhen was then forced to make his way back to Yangzhou by land, lecturing at a number of monasteries on the way. Jianzhen travelled along the Gan River to Jiujiang, and then down the Yangtze River. The entire failed enterprise took him close to three years. By the time Jianzhen returned to Yangzhou, he was blind from an infection.

In the autumn of 753, the blind Jianzhen decided to join a Japanese emissary ship returning to its home country. After an eventful sea journey of several months, the group finally landed at Kagoshima, Kyūshū, on December 20. They reached Nara in the spring of the next year and were welcomed by the Emperor. At Nara, Jianzhen presided over Tōdai-ji. The Chinese monks who travelled with him introduced Chinese religious sculpture to the Japanese. In 755, the first ordination platform in Japan was constructed at Tōdai-ji, on the site where former Emperor Shōmu and Empress Kōmyō received ordination by Jianzhen a year earlier. In 759 he retired to a piece of land granted to him by the imperial court in the western part of Nara. There he founded a school and also set up a private temple, Tōshōdai-ji. In the ten years until his death in Japan, Jianzhen not only propagated the Buddhist faith among the aristocracy, but also served as an important conductor of Chinese culture.

Jianzhen died on the 6th day of the 5th month of 763.

== Legacy ==
Jianzhen is credited with the introduction of the Ritsu school of Buddhism to Japan, which focused on the vinaya, or Buddhist monastic rules.

A dry-lacquer statue of the monk made shortly after his death can still occasionally be seen at Tōshōdai-ji. Recognised as one of the greatest of its type, it has been postulated by statue restoration experts that the statue incorporates linen clothing originally worn by Ganjin. The statue is made public only during a limited number of days around the anniversary of Jianzhen's death. For example, it was exhibited from June 2nd to 10th in 2007. The statue was temporarily brought to Jianzhen's original temple in Yangzhou in 1980 as part of a long-planned friendship exchange between Japan and China. In preparation, the Chinese dredged the entire Slender West Lake leading up to the temple from the old city center and rehabilitated Buddhist temples and other sites around the area.

Since 2022, a statue celebrating Jianzhen stands by the lake in Ueno Park, Tokyo.
