= Frederick Sutton =

Frederick Sutton may refer to:

- Fred Sutton (1836–1906), New Zealand member of parliament
- Frederick William Sutton (1832–1883), English early amateur photographer and naval engineer
