= Frederick William Sutton =

British photographer, active in Japan in the 1800s

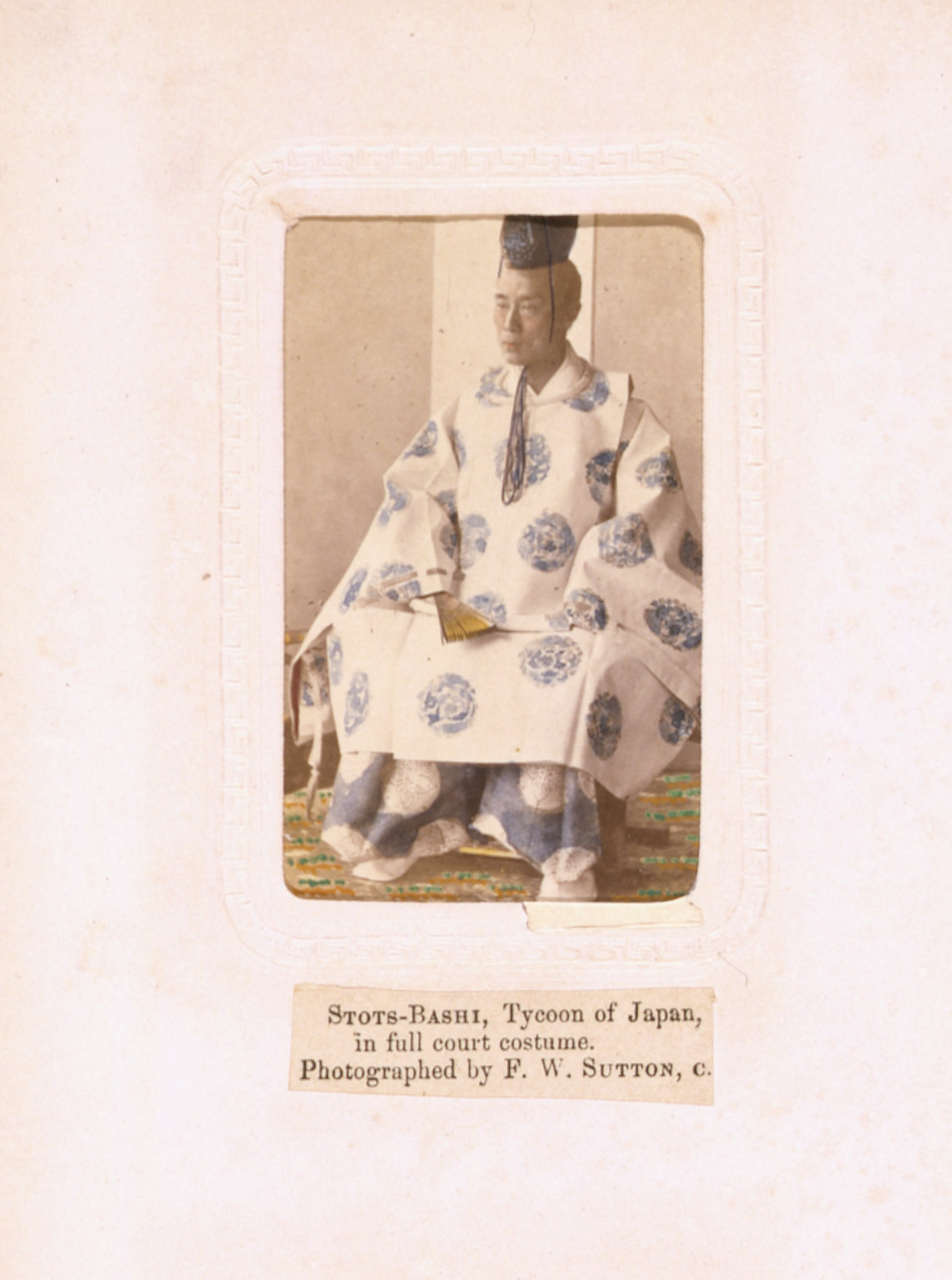
- Studio portrait of Tokugawa Yoshinobu, taken by Sutton (1867)
- Born: 29 August 1832; Woolwich, London, United Kingdom
- Died: 28 January 1883 (aged 50)
- Occupations: Naval Engineer, Photographer
- Spouse: Georgina Margaret Drummond (m. 1858)

Frederick William Sutton (29 August 1832 - 28 January 1883) was an English early amateur photographer and naval engineer best known for photographing in Meiji period Japan.

== Early life ==
Sutton was born in Woolwich, United Kingdom on 29 August 1832, the son of a civil engineer. He joined the Royal Navy in 1854 as a Third Class Assistant, around the beginning of the Crimean War, on HMS St Vincent, later transferring to HMS Simoom on course to the Black Sea. Landing in Constantinople, the Simoom acted as a supply ship to Crimea and in May 1855 at Sevastopol in an Anglo-French naval raid, she fought against the Russian opposition on the Sea of Azov. In 1858 he was assigned to HMS Exmouth as an Assistant Engineer, and in 1861 he was promoted to Engineer and again in 1864 to Chief Engineer.

In 1858 he married Georgina Margaret Drummond. Sutton's time in Japan influenced Sutton to name his youngest daughter Ume, and his last home was named 'Nihon'. After returning to England in 1879, he suffered with further health problems in 1881 and died of heart problems and Dropsy.

== Japan ==
In April 1865, Sutton joined the steam-warship HMS Serpent (1860) as Chief Engineer, posted to the China Sea for surveying duty. By 1867, HMS Serpent continued along the west and north-west coast of Japan, due to the impending opening of the port of Hyogo to foreign trade under the Anglo-Japanese Treaty of Amity and Commerce. In May the same year, she docked off Osaka to allow British officials to negotiate with Japanese Shogunal representatives the location of the foreign settlements at Hyogo and Osaka and surveying the North West Coastline, last surveyed in any capacity under the British in the 1790s by William Broughton, departing from Nagasaki in June 1868 having completed surveyance and explored lighthouse installment later completed by Richard Henry Brunton.

'Captain Sutton has been surveying the harbours of Osaka and Hiogo and the foreign quarters onshore, of all which he has made good plans.'[4]

In May 1867, the Navy asked Sutton to begin using his camera setup to capture images of Japan in Osaka Bay. In August 1866, the Serpent escorted Minister Parkes on nonofficial visits to Satsuma and Uwajima, and it was during this period that Parkes commissioned Sutton to photograph Tokugawa Yoshinobu. On 1 May 1867, Sutton was received by the Shogun and took portraits he processed using collodion-treated glass plates and was run in the Illustrated London News as a woodcut illustration on 10 August 1867. Felice Beato would go on to reissue the images for posterity.

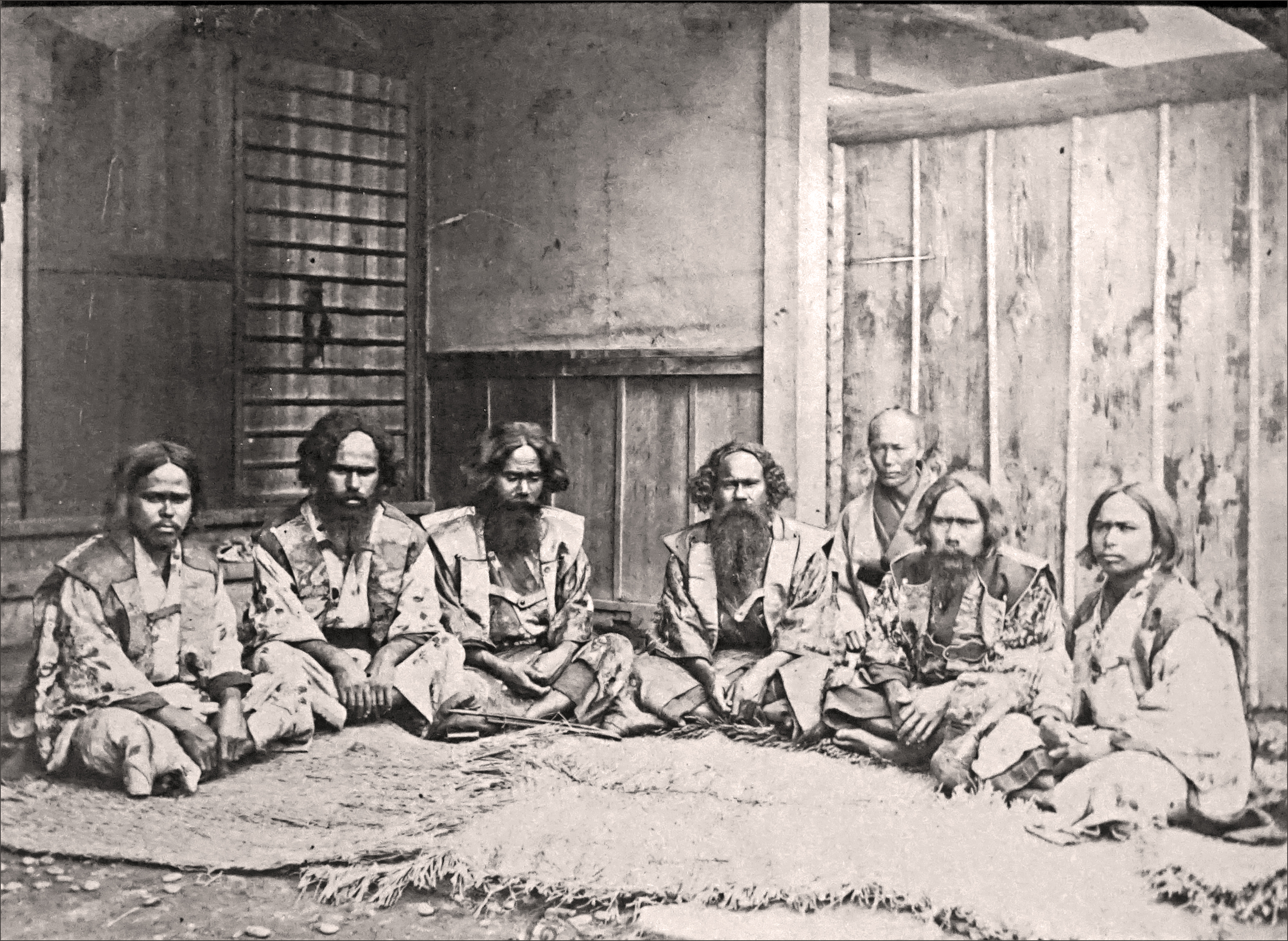
Group of 6 Ainu men (1867)

Sutton succeeded in developing the negatives despite losing some of his lenses and chemicals in a shipping incident with choppy waters; but without a larger lens, Sutton had to take his portraits in a small format.

Sutton would go on to take 16 further collodion plate photographs of Osaka Castle and other landscapes and views, which survived in the publishings of Francis Friths 'series of World Views'. From the 7 July to 11 July, he also took images of the Ainu at Hakodate, which are thought to be the first images ever taken of the Ainu peoples, encouraged by Thomas Blakiston on Sutton's behalf.

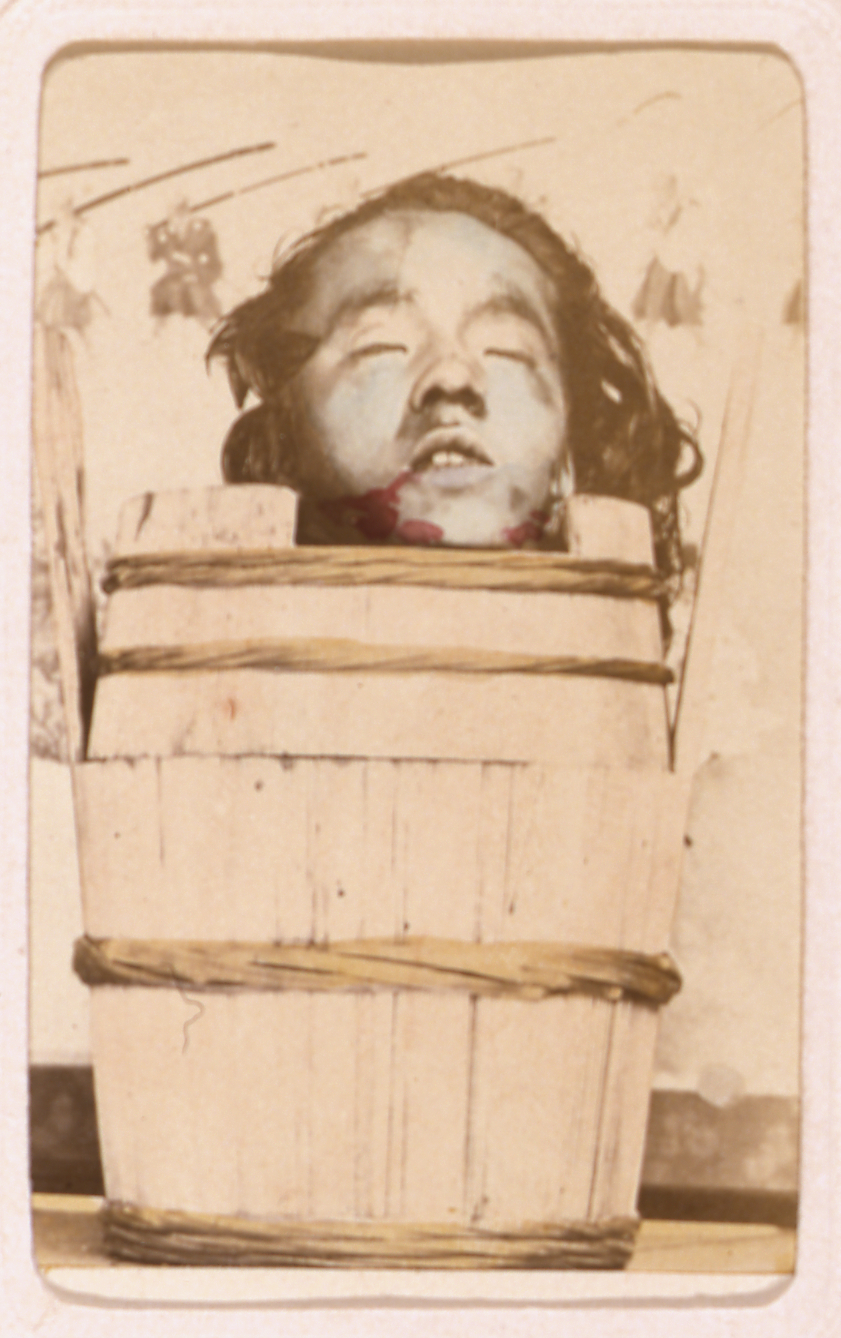
Head of Hayashida (1868)

On the 21 March 1868, Sutton accompanied Parkes again to Kyoto, and began photographing his lodgings (Chionin Temple) and their Japanese escorts, with an early example of a Panorama of the Kyoto landscape. After the attack on the British Legation on 27 March, he also photographed the severed head of their attackers and departed Japan.

He returned to Japan in 1873 in July as a member of Archibald Lucius Douglass British Naval training mission, based in Tsukiji at the Imperial Japanese Naval Academy. In 1874 Sutton took over the Engineering class with two teaching staff, on his advice at a new naval cadet training school opened at Yokosuka in May 1874 where he worked as 'Head of the steam department' for the newly formed Naval Arsenal. Taken ill in the summer, he recuperated in Nikko, where he resided in a traditional Japanese abode until April 1875. He was reported by British officials to speak Japanese, and thoroughly 'likes the country [of Japan]', frequently finding little time other than to carry on his photography, engaging in local culture, which are presumed to be lost. In 1876 his contract was renewed and he moved his 3 daughters to Japan with him, where they hosted regular tea parties and tennis activities at their home in Tokyo's foreign community. After suffering a related deterioration of his health in February 1879, in April his contract was terminated and they returned home on 19 May 1879 after receiving an audience with Emperor Meiji, departing from Yokohama. Sutton on returning to London in 1879 also attempted to deliver a series of lectures about his photographic slides entitled 'Lantern Exhibitions of Travels in the Eastern Island World, China, Loo-Choo, and Japan'
