= Raigō =

Japanese Buddhist belief

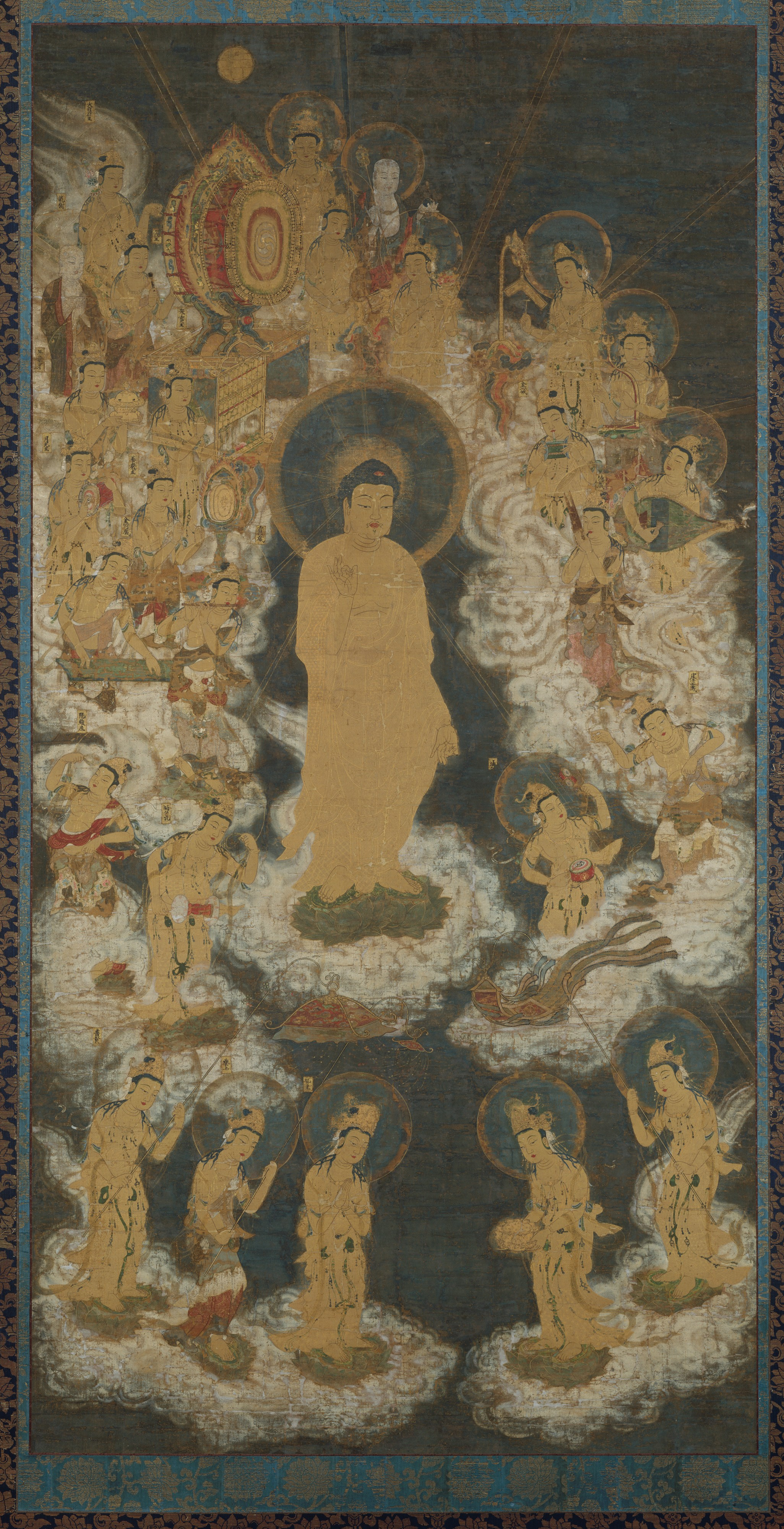
Painting of the Amida Buddha descending from heaven in a raigō procession (14th century)

Raigō (Japanese: 来迎; lit. "welcoming approach"; Sanskrit: pratyudyāna) is a pivotal concept in Pure Land Buddhism, referring to the belief that Amida Buddha descends from the Pure Land of Sukhavati to guide the mindstreams of a devotee to the Pure Land at the moment of death. This spiritual event is viewed as a literal escort by the Buddha, ensuring the deceased avoids the pitfalls of the lower realms of rebirth. Often accompanied by a celestial retinue of bodhisattvas, including Seishi and Kannon, Amida is said to appear on gold and purple clouds (紫雲) to the dying person to validate their faith and provide a serene passage into the Pure Land.

== Overview ==
While the roots of the concept trace back to Chinese Pure Land traditions, the raigō idea flourished in Japan during the Heian period (794–1185) when it was brought to Japan by the monk Ennin.

The rise in popularity of Pure Land Buddhism was largely driven by the influential monk Genshin and his seminal text, the Ōjōyōshū ("Essentials of Rebirth"). Genshin’s vivid descriptions of both the horrors of hell and the bliss of the Pure Land resonated deeply with an aristocracy increasingly preoccupied with death and salvation. He emphasized that even those with heavy karmic burdens could achieve raigō through the sincere recitation of the Nembutsu, or the name of Amida Buddha. In the Ōjōyōshū, Genshin described the raigō experience as follows,

Moreover, at the hour of death, great joy naturally arises (in the minds of) people who have diligently practiced the nenbutsu and have been devoted (to the Pure Land teachings) for many years. This is because, as a result of his vows, Amida Tathāgata, emitting a great light and surrounded by an assembly of bodhisattvas and hundreds of thousands of monks, will appear, suffused in light, in front of (the dying). At that time, Kannon of great compassion will come before (the dying), stretch out his arms that are adorned by a hundred types of merit, and offer a bejeweled lotus dais (to the dying). At the same time, the bodhisattva Seishi, together with a multitude of innumerable sages, will praise (the dying), extend his hands, and lead (the dying) to the Pure Land. At this time, the practitioners themselves see this (happen) with their own eyes, feel joy in their hearts, and attain a state of peace and bliss, both physical and mental. (The peace and bliss they experience) is similar (to that achieved upon) entering a state of meditation. You should know that at the moment (the dying) close their eyes in their hermitages, they will find themselves sitting in the lotus position on the lotus dais. Immediately, (they will find themselves) following behind Amida Buddha with a multitude of bodhisattvas and in an instant will be born in the Land of Supreme Bliss in the western direction.

== Raigō art ==
Depictions of raigō in Asian art serves as a visual representation of a core promise in Pure Land Buddhism, the idea that Amida Buddha will personally arrive to escort a faithful person to the Pure Land. This artistic tradition gained immense traction during the late Heian and Kamakura periods, fueled by a societal fear of mappō, an era believed to be a spiritually "degenerate age" where achieving enlightenment through traditional means was nearly impossible. By focusing on Amida’s specific vow to appear before the dying, these works offered a comforting, tangible hope for salvation.

The various depictions show Amida as part of a triad with two bodhisattvas, or with a larger retinue that also includes musicians playing celestial music. The medium of painting was particularly well-suited for capturing the drama of this celestial arrival. Artists utilized silk scrolls to depict Amida and a vast retinue sweeping across autumn landscapes on silvery clouds, a style that eventually evolved into the "rapid descent" (haya-raigō) to emphasize the speed of divine mercy. These paintings were also functional ritual tools. During deathbed rites, the dying would gaze at the image, sometimes holding colorful threads attached directly to the painted hands of the Buddha to create a physical and spiritual bridge to the divine in their final moments.

Among the upper classes, raigō paintings and sculpture became very popular, as they depicted the Amida Buddha coming down in celebration in relation to dead relatives or to one's own house. Some of these paintings are clearly yamato-e, or Japanese paintings in that they gave artists a chance to paint Japanese landscapes.

Translating this sense of motion into sculpture presented a significant technical challenge for Japanese artisans. While painters could easily depict figures floating through the air or rushing over mountains, sculptors were limited by the weight and stillness of their materials. Historically, sculptural figures attached to a Buddha's halo often appeared rigid rather than weightless. However, by the late Heian period, sculptors began experimenting with realism to bridge this gap. A notable example is the Amida Triad at Joshoko-ji, where the attendant bodhisattvas are carved leaning forward in a crouched position, a pose designed to mimic the forward momentum and urgent presence found in contemporary paintings.

The aesthetic details of these works also reflected the high status of their patrons, often involving luxurious materials and complex techniques. High-quality pieces featured deep blue silk backgrounds, rich gold pigments, and kirikane—a meticulous process of applying delicate, cut-gold leaf to create intricate patterns on the deities' robes. Whether through the shimmering rays of light in a painting or the tense, forward-leaning posture of a wooden statue, the goal of Raigō art was to transform a complex theological concept into a vivid, realistic encounter that reassured the believer of their upcoming transition to the Pure Land.

=== Gallery ===
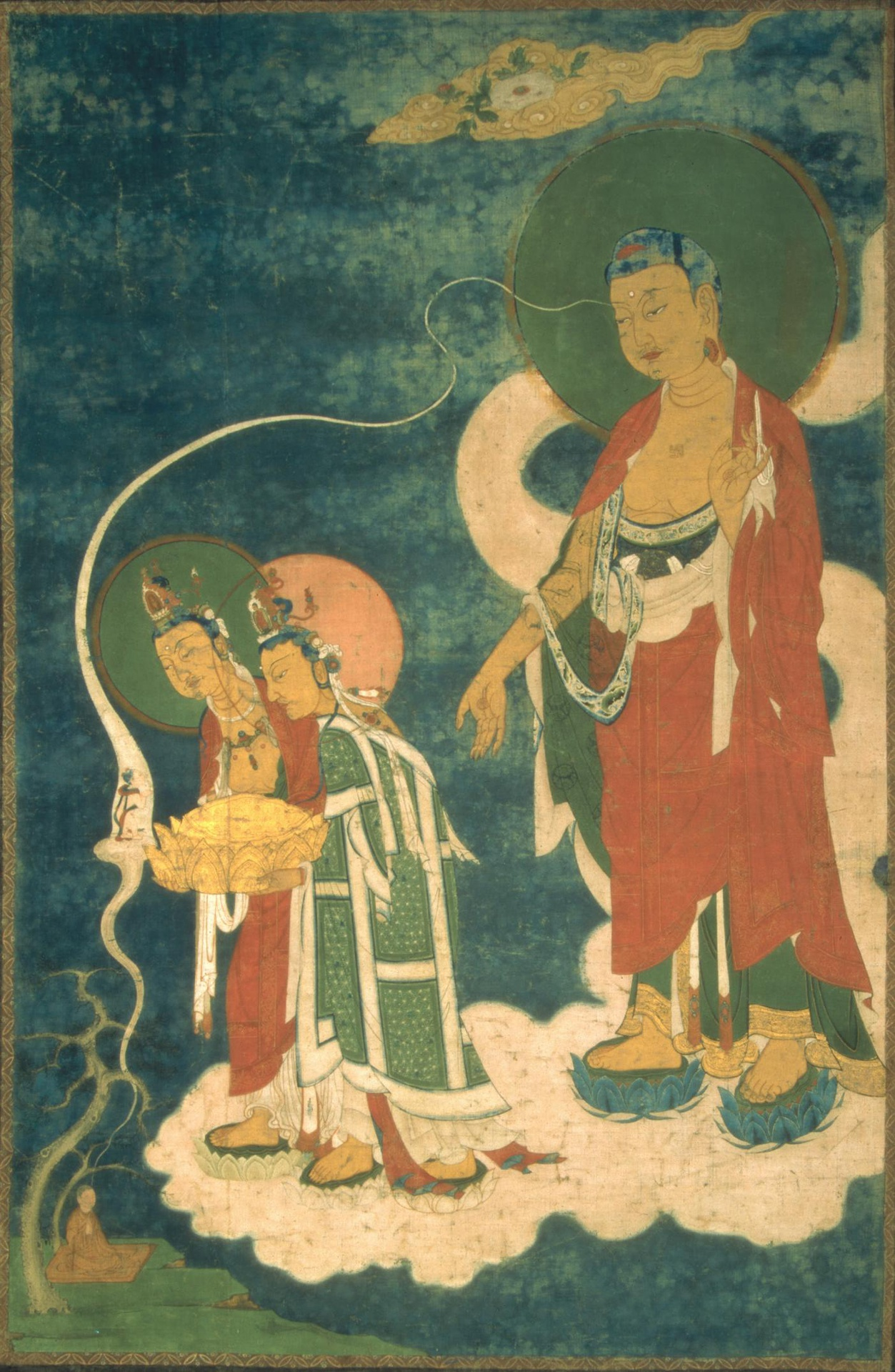
13th century painting from Kharakhoto, Roll on canvas. Hermitage Museum.

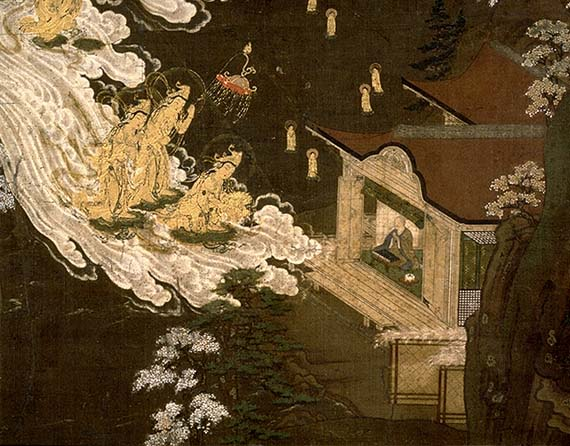
The Amida arriving at the person's home, hanging scroll painting, 13th century

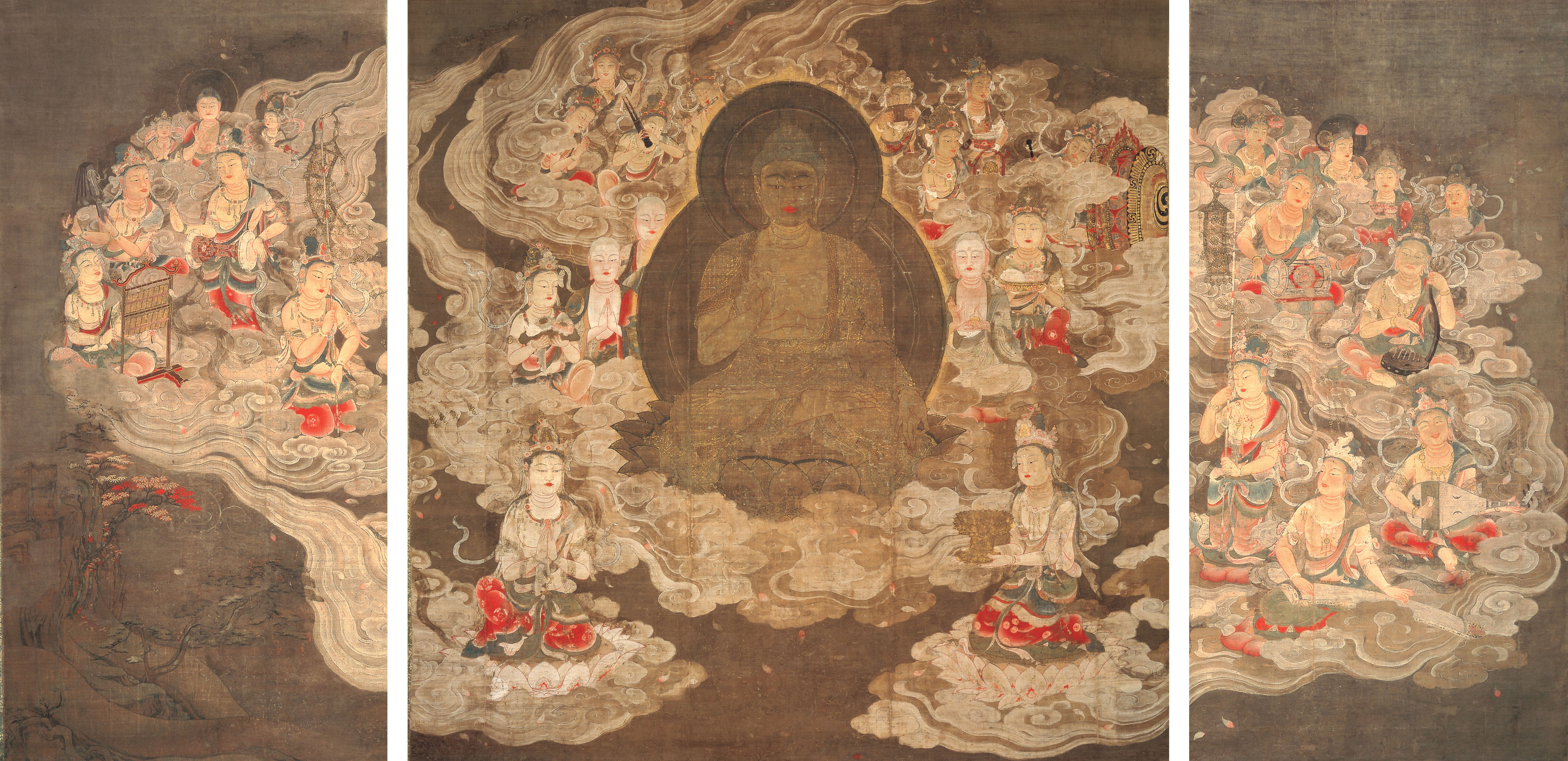
Raigō painting from the late Heian period

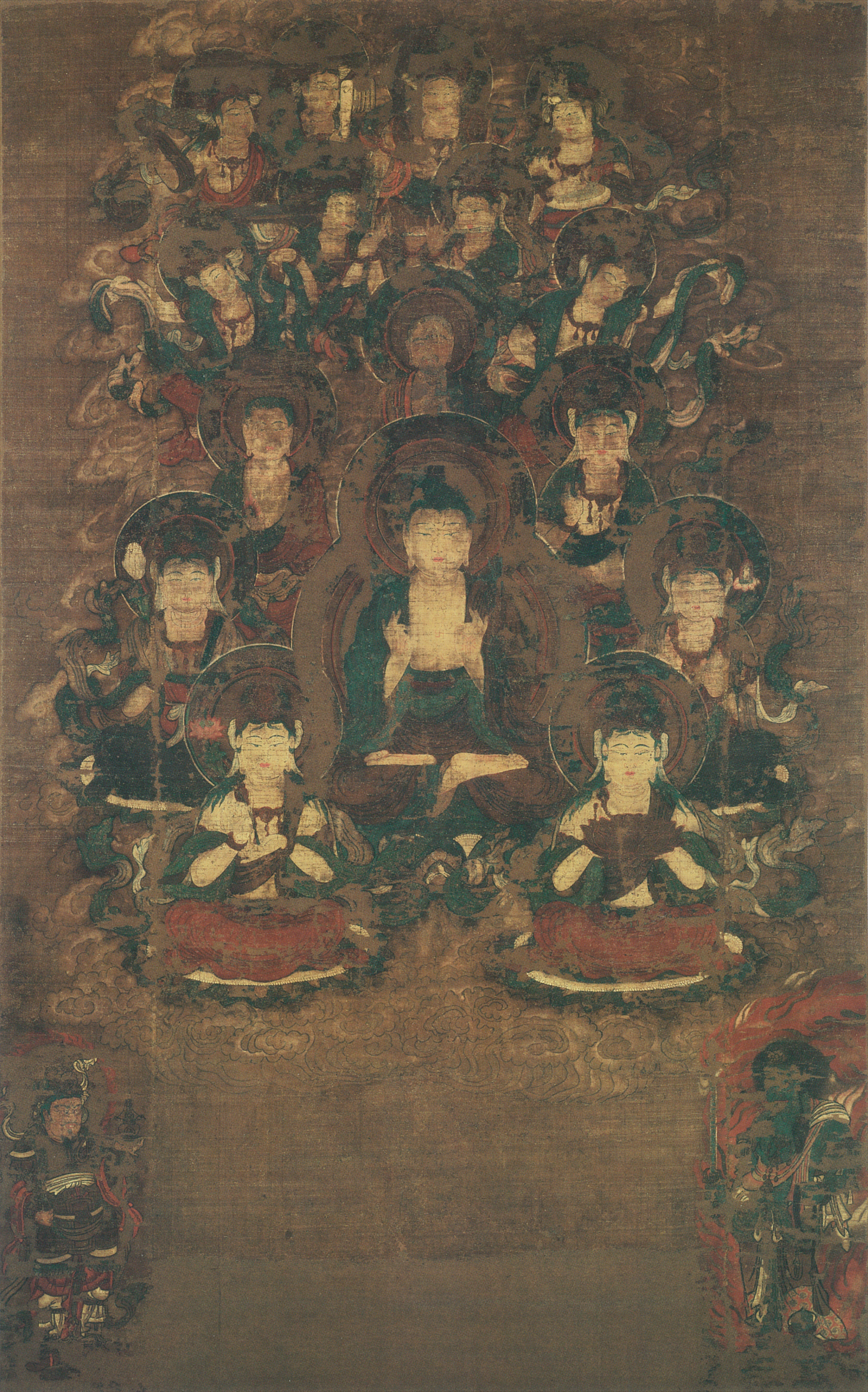
12th century painting

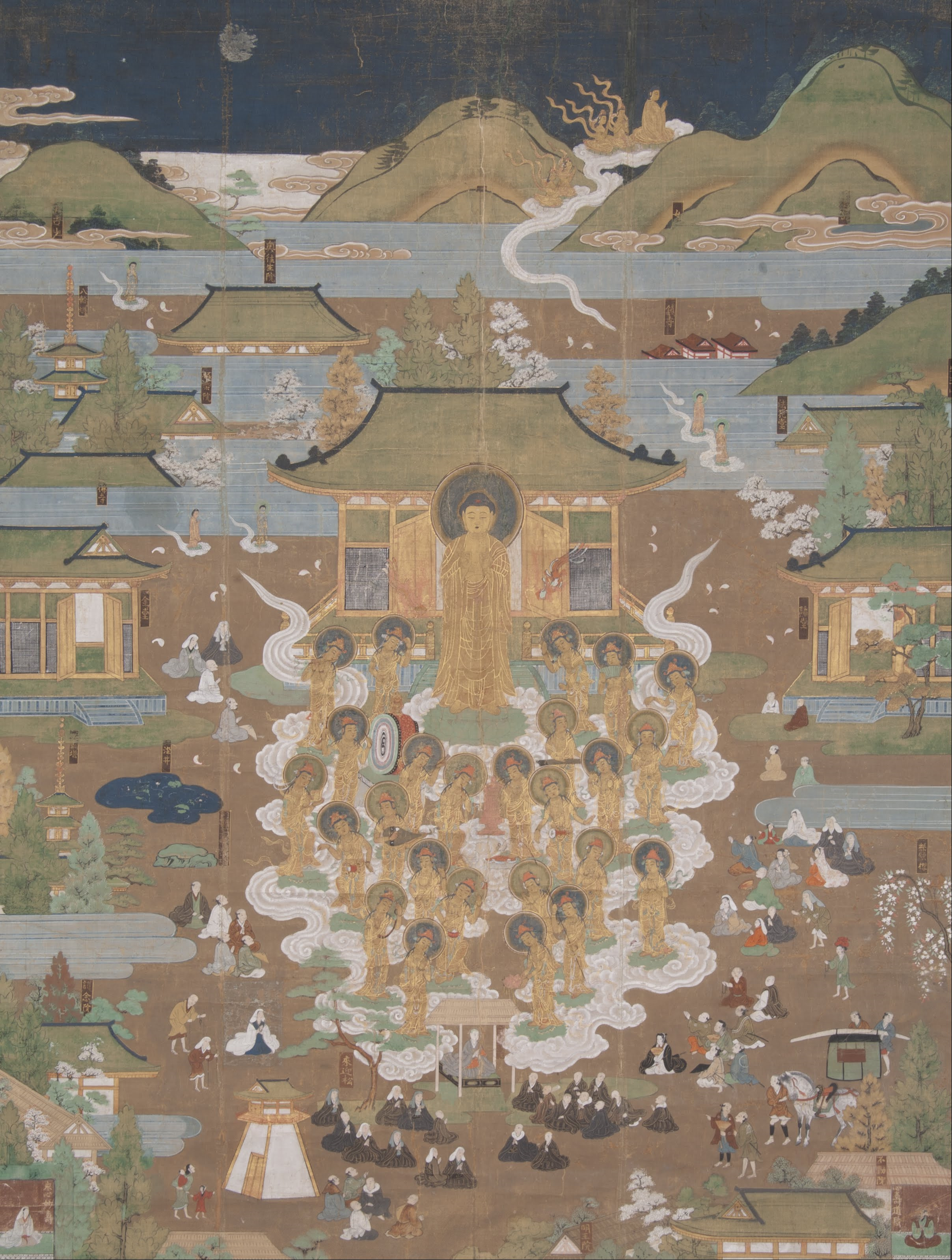
The Amida welcomes Chûjôhime to the Western Paradise, hanging scroll painting, 16th century, owned by the University of Michigan Museum of Art

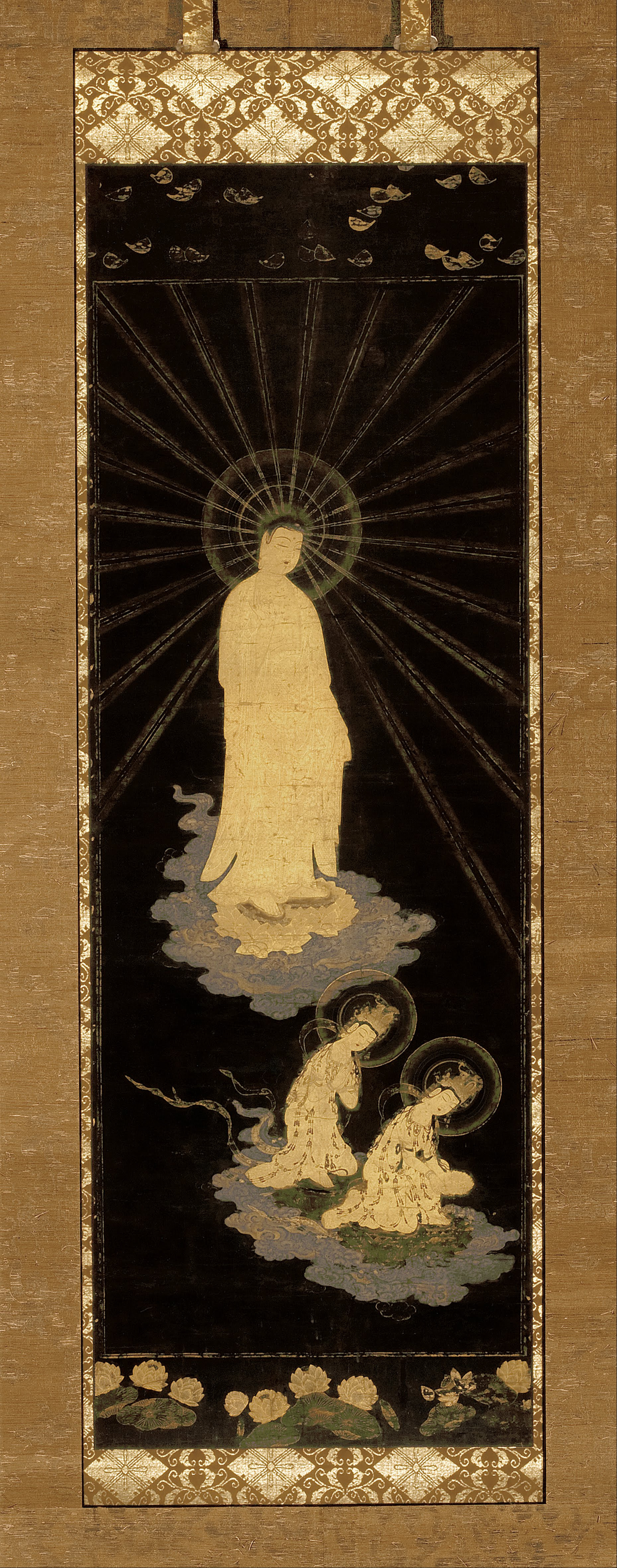
Descent of the Amida trinity, early 14th century

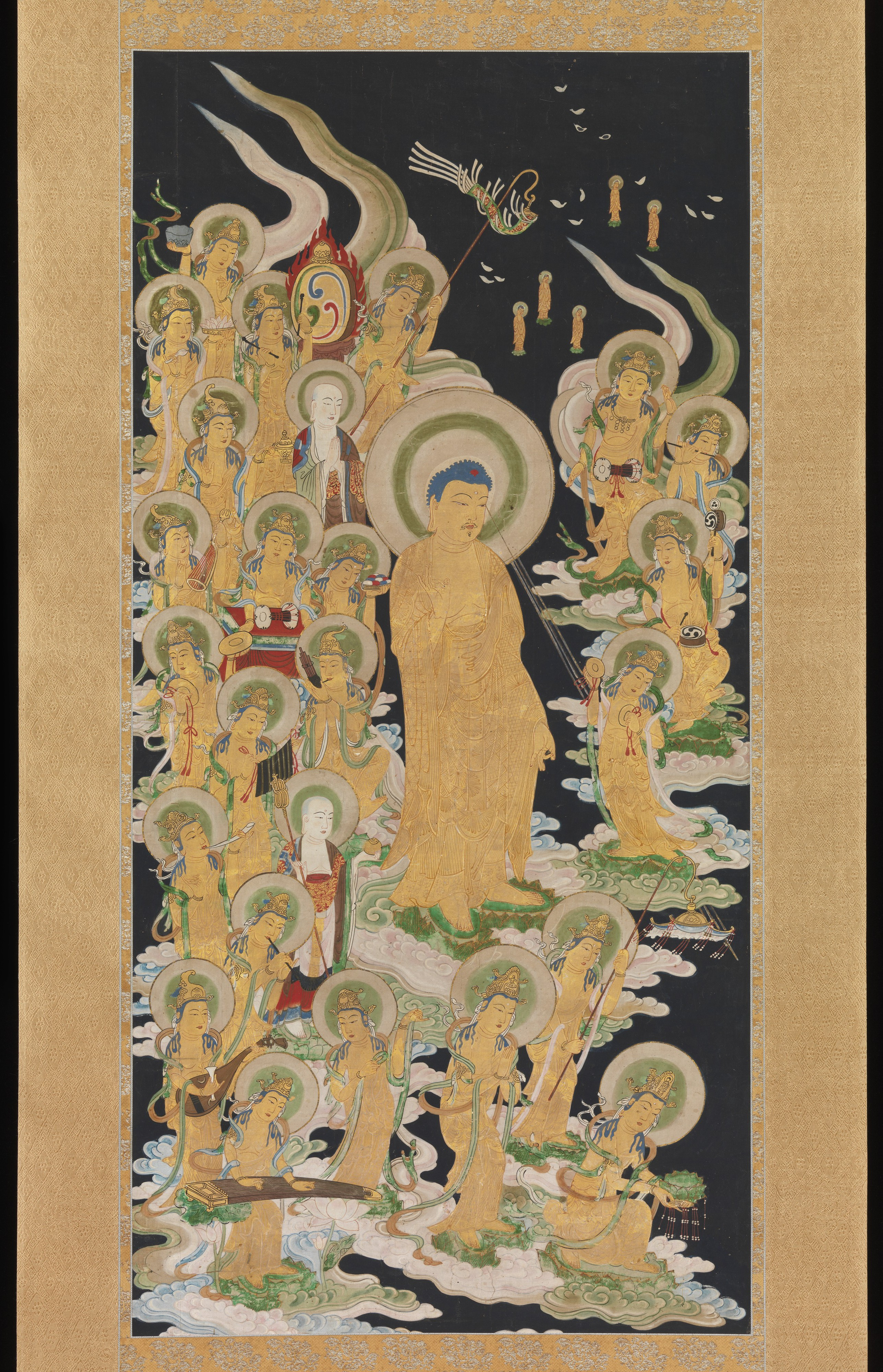
Raigō scroll, c. 17th–18th century, at the MET

== See also ==
- Deathbed phenomena - Parapsychologic experiences with some similarities with Raigō
