= Uguisu no fun =

Japanese cosmetic made from nightingale droppings

Uguisu no fun (鶯の糞, literally meaning "nightingale faeces" in Japanese), also called the "Geisha Facial", refers to the excrement (fun) produced by a particular nightingale, the Japanese bush warbler (uguisu). The droppings have been used in facials throughout Japanese history. Recently, the product has appeared in the Western world. The facial is said to whiten the skin and balance skin tone, as well as treat skin affected by hyperpigmentation.

== History ==
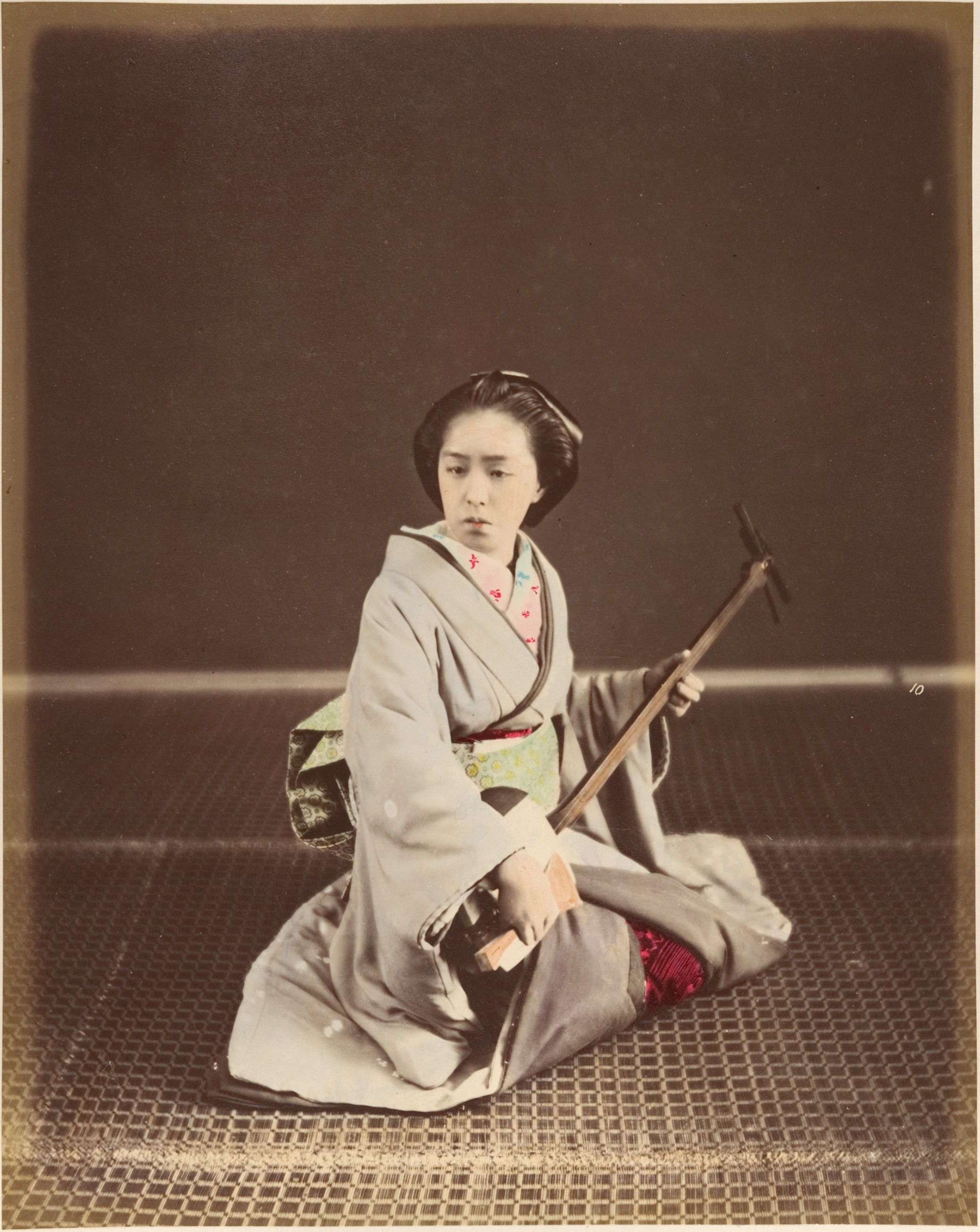
Geisha historically used uguisu no fun to remove their white makeup, and to whiten and condition their skin.

The use of nightingale excrement dates back to the Heian period (794–1185) when it was introduced to the Japanese by the Korean people. Koreans used the guano to remove dye from fabric, allowing them to make intricate designs on clothing. The Japanese used the bird droppings to remove stains from silk garments such as kimono. During the Edo period (1603–1868), the Japanese expanded its use by using it as a beauty treatment. Geisha and kabuki actors used white makeup known as oshiroi that contained zinc and lead, which likely caused many issues such as skin diseases. Uguisu no fun was used to thoroughly remove this makeup and to whiten the skin. Buddhist monks also used the droppings to polish and clean their bald scalps.

The first modern written mention of the use of uguisu no fun is in a book entitled Shunkin-sho (Portrait of Lady Shunkin), published in 1933 by Jun'ichirō Tanizaki, set in Japan's Meiji period (1868–1912).

Currently, Hyakusuke is the last shop in Tokyo to sell government-approved uguisu no fun. This 200 year-old cosmetic shop carries the powder along with other cosmetic products.

The modern-day revival of uguisu no fun in Japan may be attributed to a respect for ancestral traditions as well as to the innovative culture of Japan.

== Processing ==
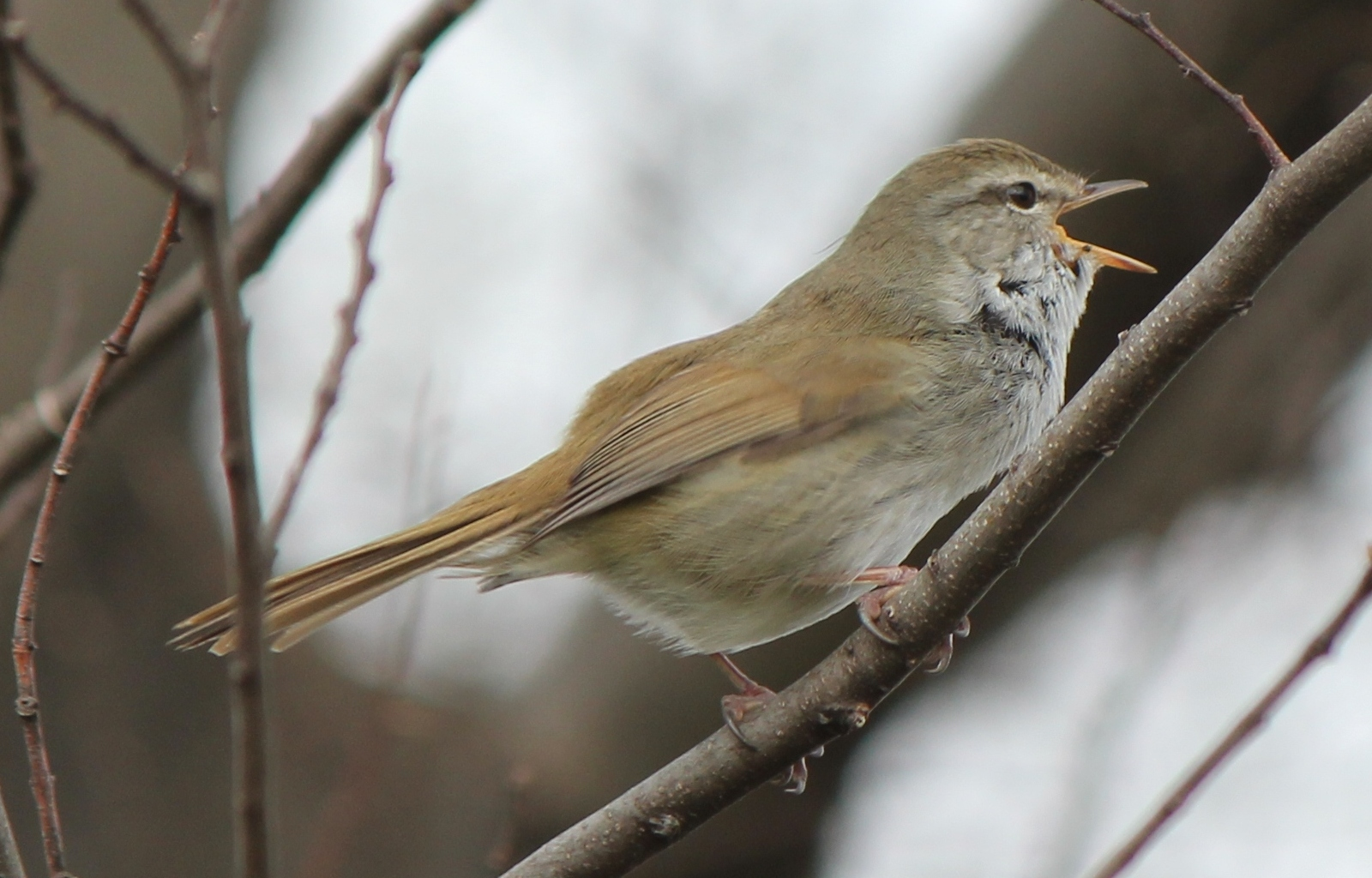
The Japanese bush warbler (Cettia diphone) produces uguisu no fun.

Uguisu no fun is harvested in nightingale farms in Japan. Though wild nightingales eat insects and berries, the diet of the caged birds consists of organic seeds. Some nightingales feed on caterpillars that eat from plum trees. The guano is scraped from the cages, and an ultraviolet light is often used to kill the bacteria to sanitize it. The droppings are then usually dried with a dehydrator. Some are sun-dried for over two weeks while simultaneously being UV sterilized. Next, it is ground into a fine white powder, and it is sold in this form.

== Facial ==
Rice bran is sometimes added to the guano for the purpose of exfoliation. The powder is mixed with water, yielding a paste, before being massaged into the skin for a few minutes and then being rinsed off. The facial is usually rather odorless and sanitized. The added rice bran can also neutralize the slight musky odor.

In one New York spa that offers the application of ugisu no fun, the process takes about one hour and costs $180.

== Mechanism of facial ==
The way the facial works is not entirely clear. The guano from the nightingale has a high concentration of urea and guanine. Because birds excrete a fecal and urine waste from a single opening, called the cloaca, the fecal-urine combination gives the droppings a high concentration of urea. Urea is sometimes found in cosmetics because it locks moisture into the skin. The guanine may produce shimmery, iridescent effects on the skin. It is claimed that because of the short intestine of the nightingale, the droppings have protein, a fat-degrading enzyme, and a whitening enzyme that acts on fat and scurf to whiten skin and even out blemishes.

Numerous sources comment that "the amino acid guanine" gives uguisu no fun its cosmetic properties, though guanine is a nucleotide base, not an amino acid.

== In popular culture ==
Victoria Beckham, who has long suffered with acne, has used uguisu no fun to improve her skin. It was reported that Beckham admired the clarity of the skin of Japanese women and subsequently learned about the droppings.

In the novel Memoirs of a Geisha, the character Chiyo repays Hatsumomo's cruelty by mixing pigeon droppings with her face cream that contained unguent of nightingale droppings.

In the 2012 movie Mirror Mirror, based on the fairytale Snow White, the evil queen, played by Julia Roberts, undergoes extreme beauty treatments in order to woo a prince. The treatment begins with an application of bird droppings to her face.

== Bibliography ==
- Berg, Rona (2007). Beauty: The New Basics. Wiley Publishing Inc. p. 249. ISBN 978-0-7611-0186-4.
- Carroll, Marcie; Carroll, Rick (2007). The Unofficial Guide to Maui. Hoboken, NJ: Wiley Publishing Inc. p. 249. ISBN 978-0-470-05224-2.
- Drill, Esther; McDonald, Heather; Odes, Rebecca (2002). The Looks Book. Penguin (Non-Classics). p. 86. ISBN 978-0-14-200211-7.
- Fodor's (2009). Fodor's Japan (19 ed.). Fodor’s Travel. p. 180. ISBN 978-1-4000-0827-8.
- Frommer's (2010). Frommer's Tokyo. Hoboken, NJ: Wiley Publishing Inc. p. 241. ISBN 978-0-470-53764-0.
- Golden, Arthur (1997). Memoirs of a Geisha. Alfred A. Knopf, Inc. p. 80. ISBN 0-375-40011-7.
