= Raigō of Amida and Twenty-five Attendants =

National Treasure of Japan - Jodo-shu Painting of Amida

Raigo of Amida and Twenty-Five Attendants
- 阿弥陀二十五菩薩来迎図（早来迎） (Japanese)
- Year: 14th century
- Completion date: 14th century
- Medium: silk scroll
- Subject: Rapid Descent of Amitābha
- Dimensions: 145.1 cm × 154.5 cm (57.1 in × 60.8 in)
- Designation: National Treasure
- Location: Joint Ownership by Chion-in and Kyoto National Museum, Kyoto
- Owner: Chion-in

The Raigō of Amida and Twenty-Five Attendants, or Rapid Descent of Amida is a 14th century Japanese scroll painting on silk completed during the late Kamakura period. Currently located in the temple of Chion-in, in Kyoto, the painting depicts the salvation of the deceased by the Buddha Amitābha, and twenty-five bodhisattvas, among them Kannon and Seishi Bosatsu as they arrive to welcome a deceased soul.

Designated a National Treasure, the painting is a prominent example of Buddhist painting of its time, a characteristic of the Jōdo-shū sect of Pure Land Buddhism, founded by Hōnen.

== Background ==
In the backdrop of the end of the Heian period and the Genpei War, Hōnen founded the Jōdo Shū sect amongst a wave of religious fervor during the early Kamakura. Emphasis on the nenbutsu ("Namu Amida Butsu") was preached as the key to salvation regardless of rank or circumstances in life.

One major characteristic of salvation is depicted in the Raigō (Rapid Descent) motif, in which the Amitābha, Avalokiteśvara, and Mahasthamaprapta would elevate the soul into the Pure Land. The "Amida Triad" has been present since the early days of Japanese Buddhism during the 8th century.

== Painting ==
The Phoenix Hall of Byōdō-in, which is seen as a model of what the Pure Land looks like.

Raigō paintings, in addition to depicting Amida, the Bodhisattvas, and the deceased, would also utilize local landscapes from which the painting is dedicated, as well as temple complex it is on. It also served as teaching and fundraising tool for the clergy.

In the Chion-in painting, the work depicts the transition of the Raigō, from top left to bottom right, with the utilization of drift from the clouds to depict the speed of Amida's movement. The dying man is seen chanting the nenbutsu on the lower right.

On the upper right is a depiction of the Pure Land, in the form of a pavilion, the destination of the deceased. In the scroll, this death classified as a jo-bon jo-sho (first class, upper birth) death as described in the Amitāyur-dhyāna-sūtra, one of three principal sutras in the Pure Land sects.

Many other Raigō paintings would primarily focus on the procession and the deceased on a vertical rectangular scroll. However the Chion-in painting utilizes a square frame (1.45 meters x 1.55 meters) to add dimension, depth and detail to home in on the surrounding landscapes (including mountains, foliage, and cherry blossoms). In this case, it is presented with characteristics of Yamato-e style.

== Conservation and modern times ==
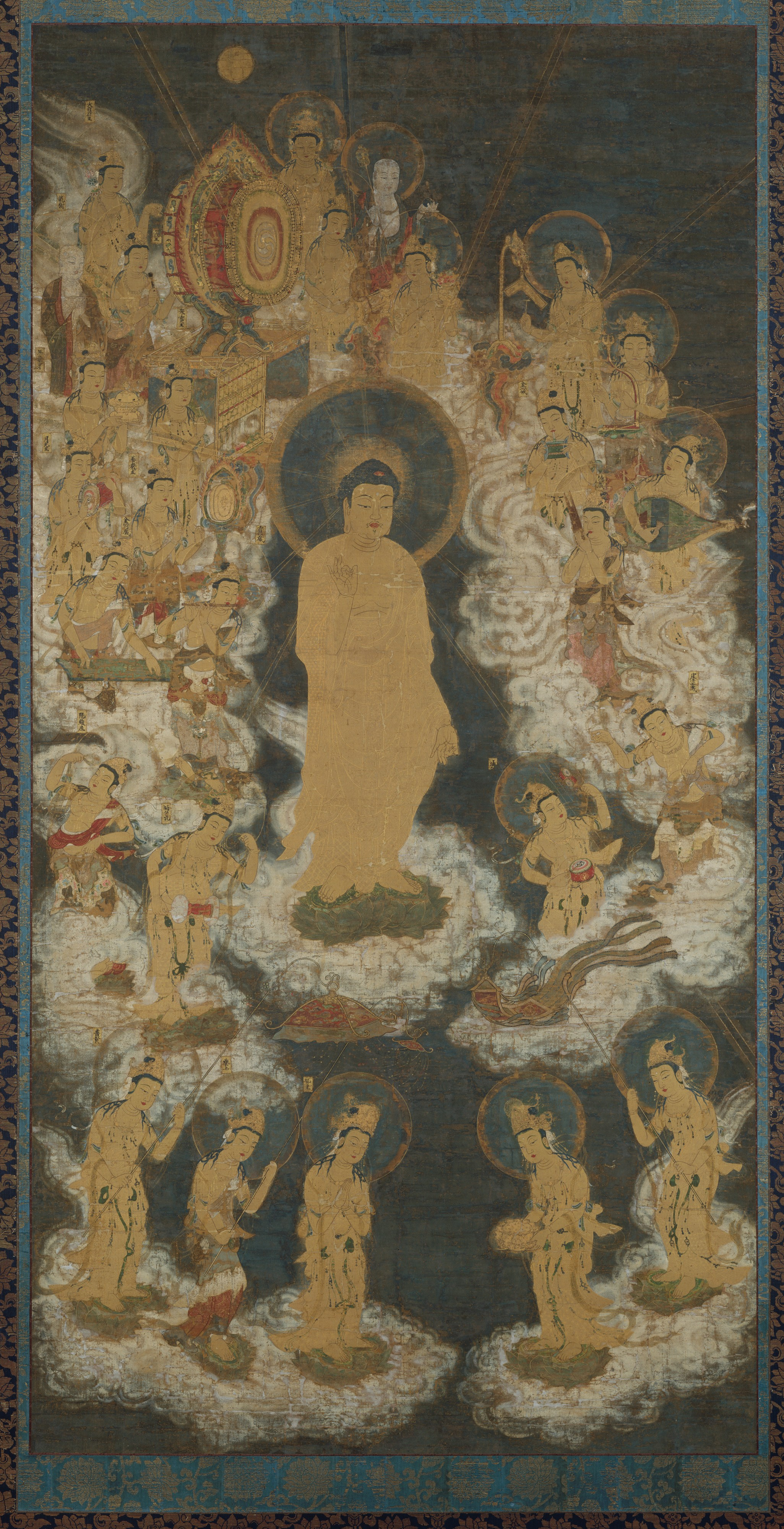
Raigō of Amitābha in Rectangular Form, late 14th century,Metropolitan Museum of Art (45.25.37)

Maintenance of paintings of this size, rendered on paper, silk often require conservation every century as the pigment, and the glue would fade and flake off.

The first repair on this painting was completed in 1934 at the Conservation Center for Cultural Properties in the Kyoto National Museum. Subsequently on 2 February 1955, it was designated a National Treasure, under registration No. 113.

From Spring 2019 to March 2022, the painting once again underwent extensive conservation with support from the Tsumugu Project, a joint initiative of the Cultural Affairs Agency, Imperial Household Agency, and the Yomiuri Shimbun.

In the conservation effort, measures were used to stabilize the adhesion of the paper backing (hadaura-gami) and adhesion of the silk in addition to reducing paint peeling. With tweezers, the old backing paper and grime was carefully removed with and replaced with a lighter brown backing. The mounting was replaced, and in addition, a new silk surface was applied to the holes of the old silk canvas, with intentional aging and coloring.

During the removal of the backing paper, the painting was scanned with infrared light and fluorescent X-ray imaging. The scans revealed the original rough sketch of the painting, which differed very little from the final product, indicating it was a commissioned piece and not mass-produced. In addition, it is revealed that the gold paint on the Amida is not uniform, but rather a combination of gilding, and kirikane patterning.

== Exhibition ==
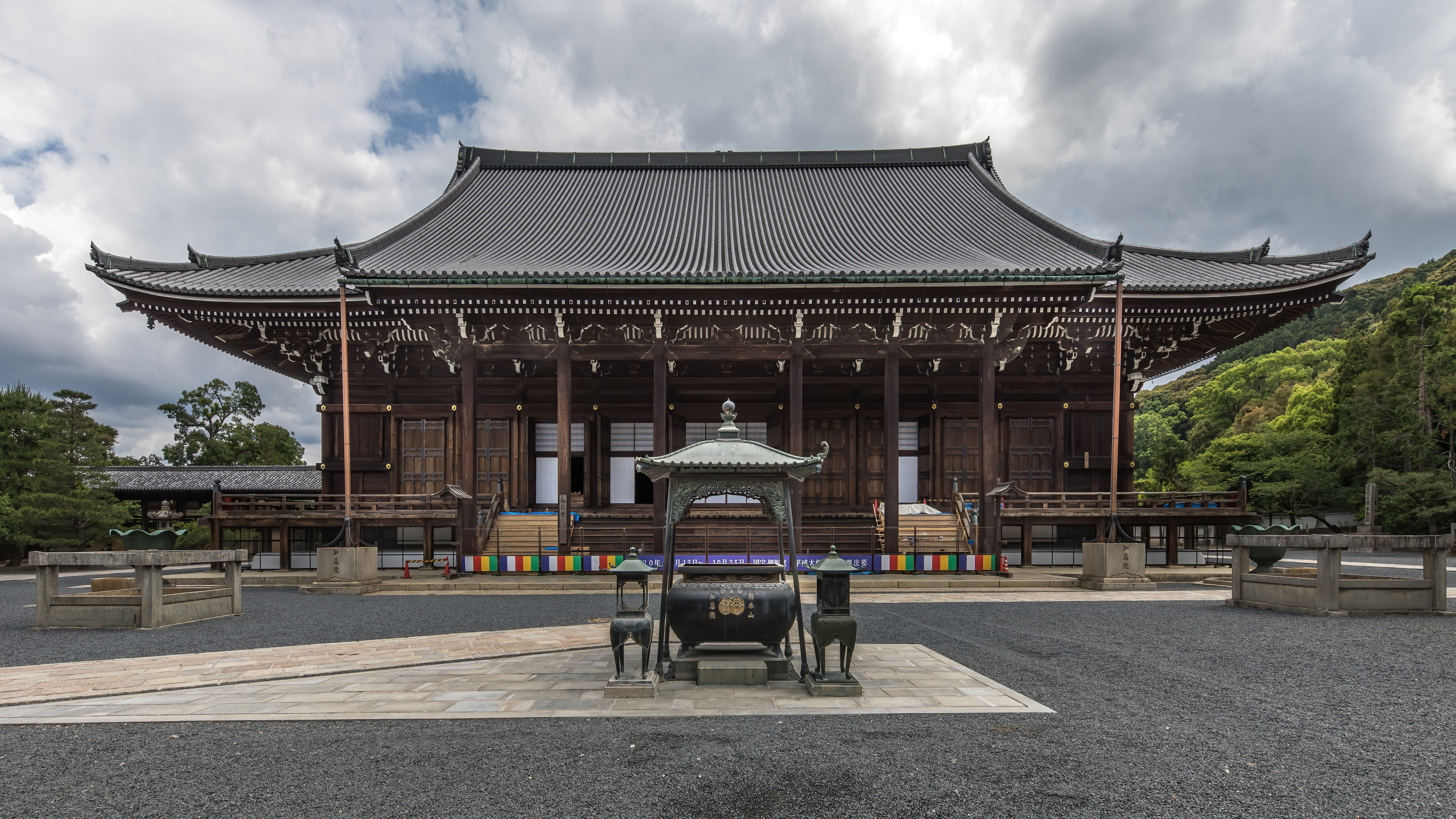
Chion-in, Higashiyama-ku, Kyoto, Japan

The painting, considered a masterpiece of Kamakura art is often put of special exhibition surrounding the life and works of Hōnen and the Jōdo-shū school.

From 25 October to 4 December 2011, it was displayed at the Tokyo National Museum exhibit: Hōnen and Shinran: Treasures Related to the Great Masters of the Kamakura Buddhism, which commemorated the 800th anniversary of Honen's death as well as the 750th anniversary of Shinran's death.

After the 2019-2022 conservation, the painting was once again displayed at Tokyo in the exhibit Hōnen and Pure Land Buddhism, which commemorates the 850th anniversary of the founding of Jōdo-shū. The exhibit ran in Tokyo on 16 April to 9 June 2024 before being on public display at the Kyoto National Museum from 8 October to 1 December 2024.

As of today, it is jointly owned by Chion-in and the Kyoto National Museum.
