= Nightingale floor =

Floors that make a chirping sound when walked upon

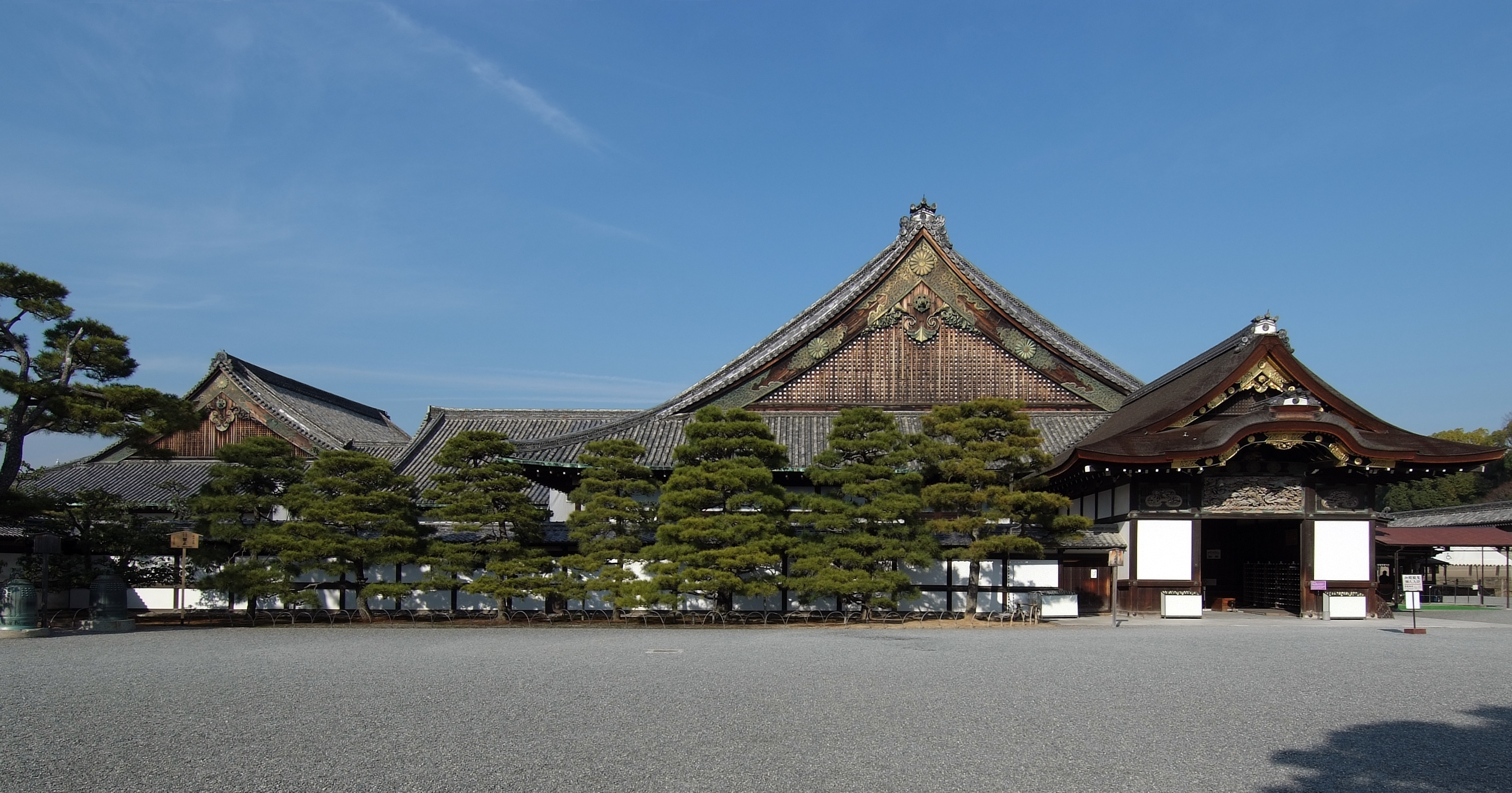
The Nijō Castle, a Historic Monument of Ancient Kyoto

Daikaku-ji nightingale floor
The sound of a person walking on the "nightingale floor" of Daikaku-ji in Kyoto

Nightingale floors (鴬張り or 鶯張り, uguisubari) are floors that make a squeaking sound when walked upon. These floors were used in the hallways of some temples and palaces, the most famous example being Nijō Castle, in Kyoto, Japan. Dry boards naturally creak under pressure, but these floors were built in a way that the flooring nails rub against a jacket or clamp, causing chirping noises.

It is unclear if the design was initially intentional. It seems that, at least initially, the effect arose by chance. An information sign in Nijō castle states that "The singing sound is not actually intentional, stemming rather from the movement of nails against clumps in the floor caused by wear and tear over the years". Legend has it that the squeaking floors were used as a security device, ensuring that no one could sneak through the corridors undetected.

The English name "nightingale" refers to the Japanese bush warbler, or uguisu, which is a common songbird in Japan.

== Etymology ==
Uguisu (鶯 or 鴬) refers to the Japanese bush warbler. The latter segment bari (張り) comes from haru (張る), which can be used to mean "to lay/board (flooring)", as in the expression yukaita wo haru (床板を張る) meaning "to board a/the floor". The verb haru becomes nominalized as hari and voiced through rendaku to become bari. In this form it refers to the method of boarding, as in other words like herinbōnbari (ヘリンボーン張り), which refers to flooring laid in a herringbone pattern. As such, uguisubari means "Warbler boarding".

== Construction ==
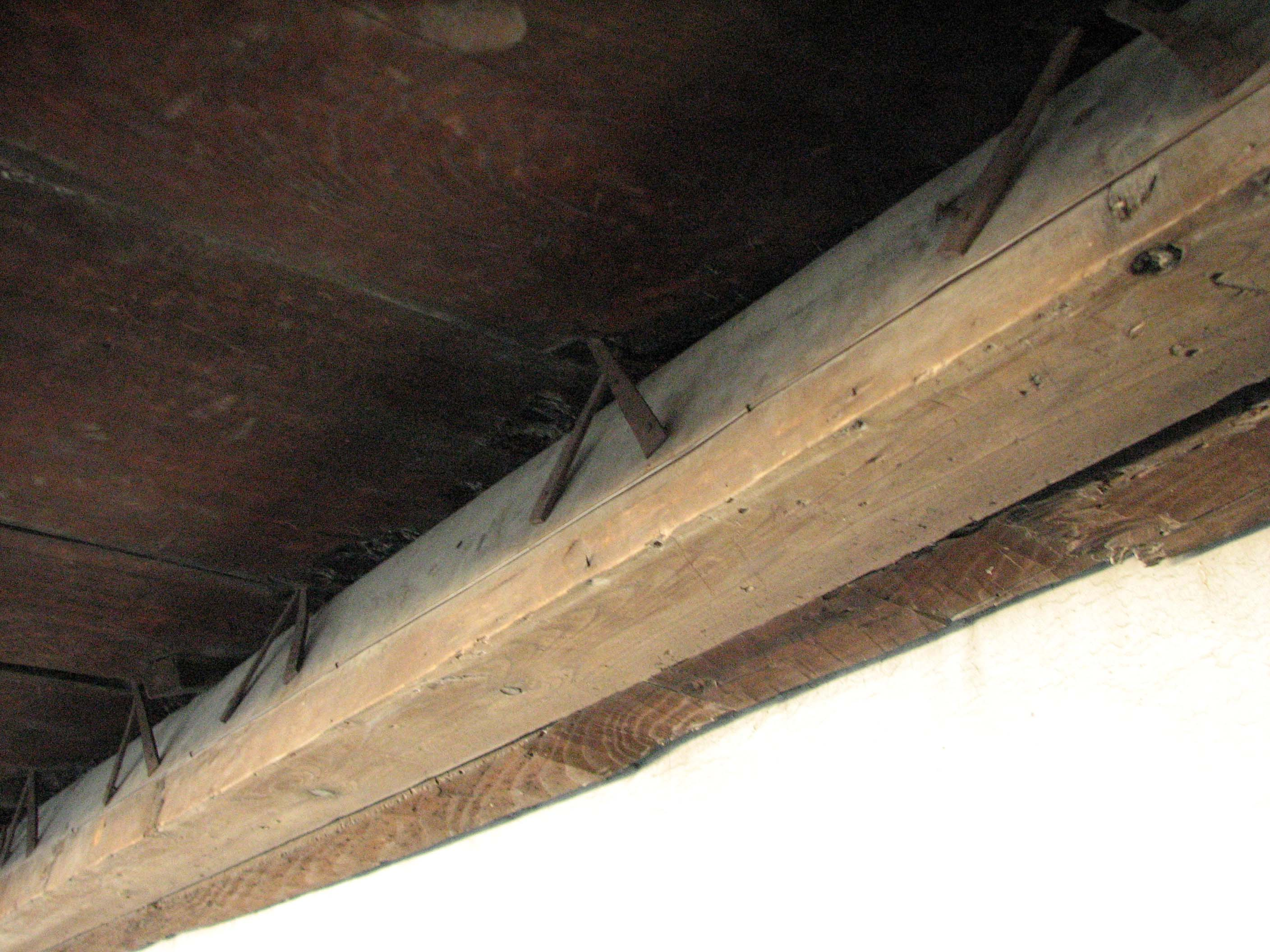
Nightingale floors use nails to make a chirping noise under pressure.

The floors were made from dried boards. Upside-down V-shaped joints move within the boards when pressure is applied.

== Examples ==
The following locations incorporate nightingale floors:

- Nijō Castle, Kyoto
- Chion-in, Kyoto
- Eikan-dō Zenrin-ji, Kyoto
- Daikaku-ji, Kyoto
- Ryōan-ji, Kyoto
- Tōji-in, Kyoto
- Erin-ji Temple, Tokyo

== Modern influences and related topics ==
- Melody Road in Hokkaido, Wakayama, and Gunma
- Singing Road in Anyanag, Gyeonggi South Korea
- Civic Musical Road in Lancaster, California
- You Only Live Twice, a 1962 novel by Ian Fleming, discusses nightingale floors at length.
- Across the Nightingale Floor, a 2002 novel by Lian Hearn
