= Chion-in =

Buddhist temple in Kyoto Prefecture, Japan

Coordinates: 35°00′23″N 135°47′02″E

- 知恩院
- Chion-in's main hall "Mieido" (御影堂)

Religion
- Affiliation: Jōdo-shū
- Deity: Amida Buddha

Location
- Location: 400 Rinka-cho, Higashiyama-ku, Kyoto, 605-8686
- Country: Japan
- Interactive map of Chion-in

Architecture
- Founder: Hōnen

Website
- www.chion-in.or.jp/en/

Chion-in (知恩院, Monastery of Gratitude) in Higashiyama-ku, Kyoto, Japan is the headquarters of the Jōdo-shū (Pure Land Sect) founded by Hōnen (1133–1212), who proclaimed that sentient beings are reborn in Amida Buddha's Western Paradise (Pure Land) by reciting the nembutsu, Amida Buddha's name.

The vast compounds of Chion-in include the site where Hōnen settled to disseminate his teachings and the site where he died.

== History ==
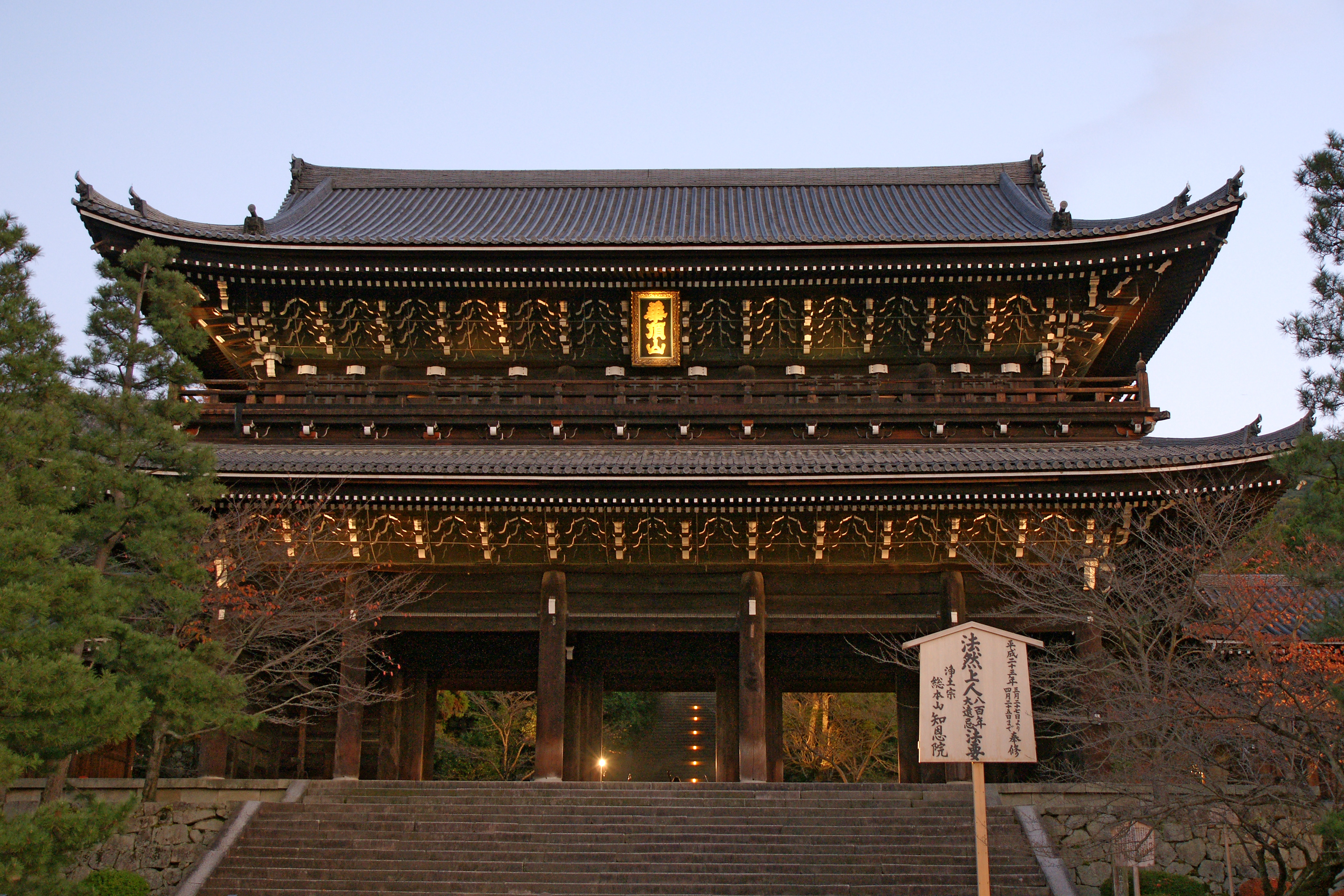
Sanmon (National Treasure of Japan)

The original temple was built in 1234 by Hōnen's disciple, Genchi (1183–1238) in memory of his master and was named Chion-in. While the temple was affiliated more closely in the early years with the Seizan branch of Jodo Shu, its 8th head priest, Nyoichi (1262–1321) was deeply influenced by the priest Ryōkū, a disciple of Ryōchū who was the 3rd head of the Chinzei branch of Jōdo-shū Buddhism, and disciple of Benchō. Later Nyoichi's successor Shunjō (1255–1355) advanced this further by citing a biography where Genchi's disciple Renjaku-bo and Ryōchū agree that there existed no doctrinal differences between them:

Then Renjaku-bo said, «There is complete agreement between what Genchi and Bencho say in their basic teaching. So my disciples should from now on look at the Chinzei teaching as their own. There is no need to set up another school.»

By 1450, Chion-in had become fully under control of the Chinzei branch, but had little direct control, due to the outbreak of the Ōnin War. Numerous buildings in the complex were burnt down in 1633, but were entirely rebuilt by the third Tokugawa shōgun Iemitsu (1604–1651) with the palatial structures that stand today.

== Architecture ==
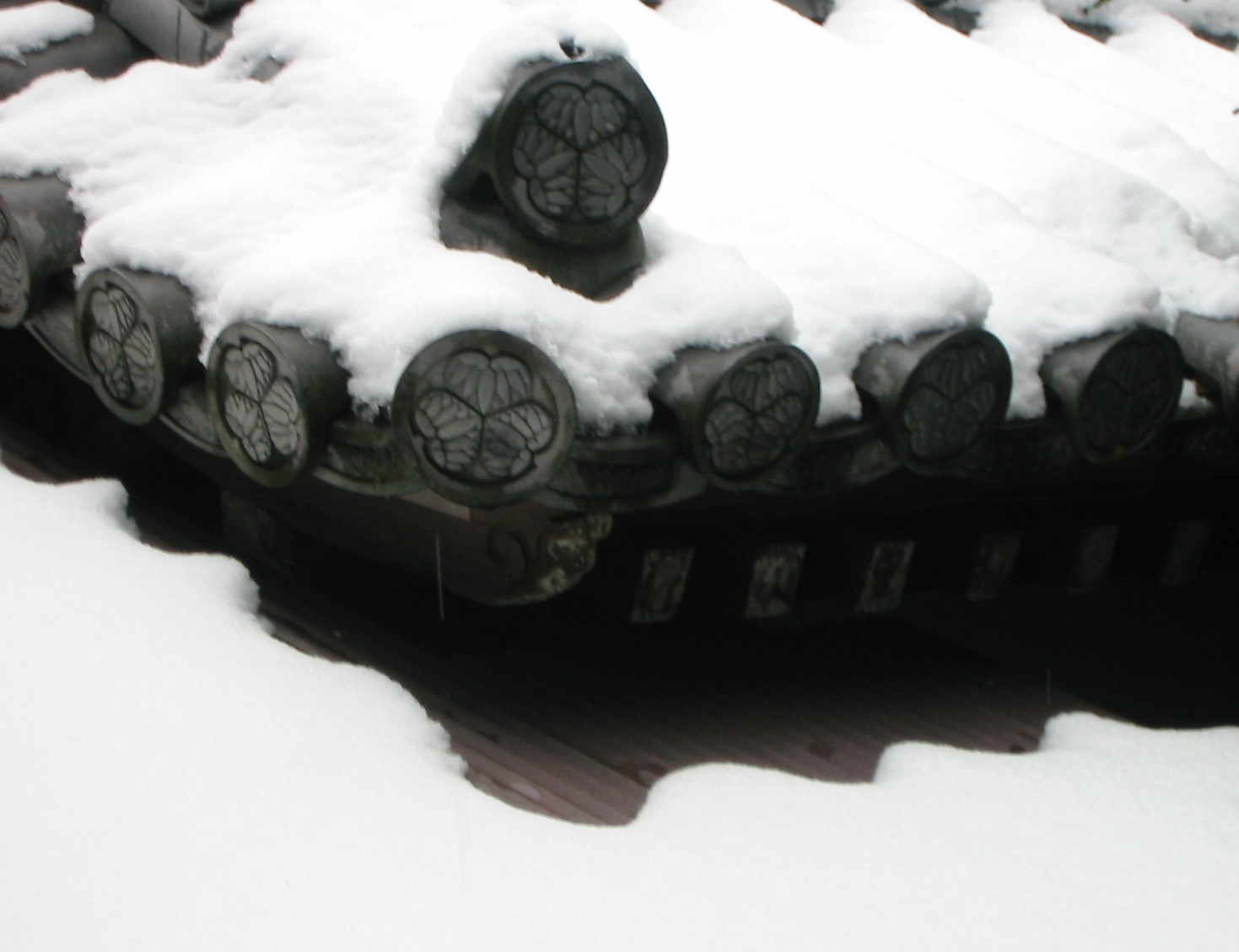
The Tokugawa family kamon (crest) can be seen in the ends of the roof tiles, honoring their patronage of the temple.

The colossal main gate, the Sanmon, was built in 1619 and is the largest surviving structure of its kind in Japan. It features an Irimoya-zukuri or a Hip and Gabled roof. The purpose of the hip and gable roof is to protect the center point of the temple.

Chion-in has a large and a small guest house in the irimoya roof style called Ohojo and Kohojo that are designated Important Cultural Heritages. Both guest houses were built in 1641.

Chion-in is home to Japan's largest temple bell, which was commissioned in 1633 and weighs 74 tons. It used to require a 25-man team to sound it. But now the temple website says 17 are needed.

There are a few interesting features to note about Chion-in: first, all roof beams are carved with the family crest of the Tokugawa family: three hollyhock leaves. Another feature is the umbrella found stashed in the rafters outside the main temple. One of the architects who helped rebuild the temple placed the umbrella in the rafters to help bring rain (and thereby ward off fire).

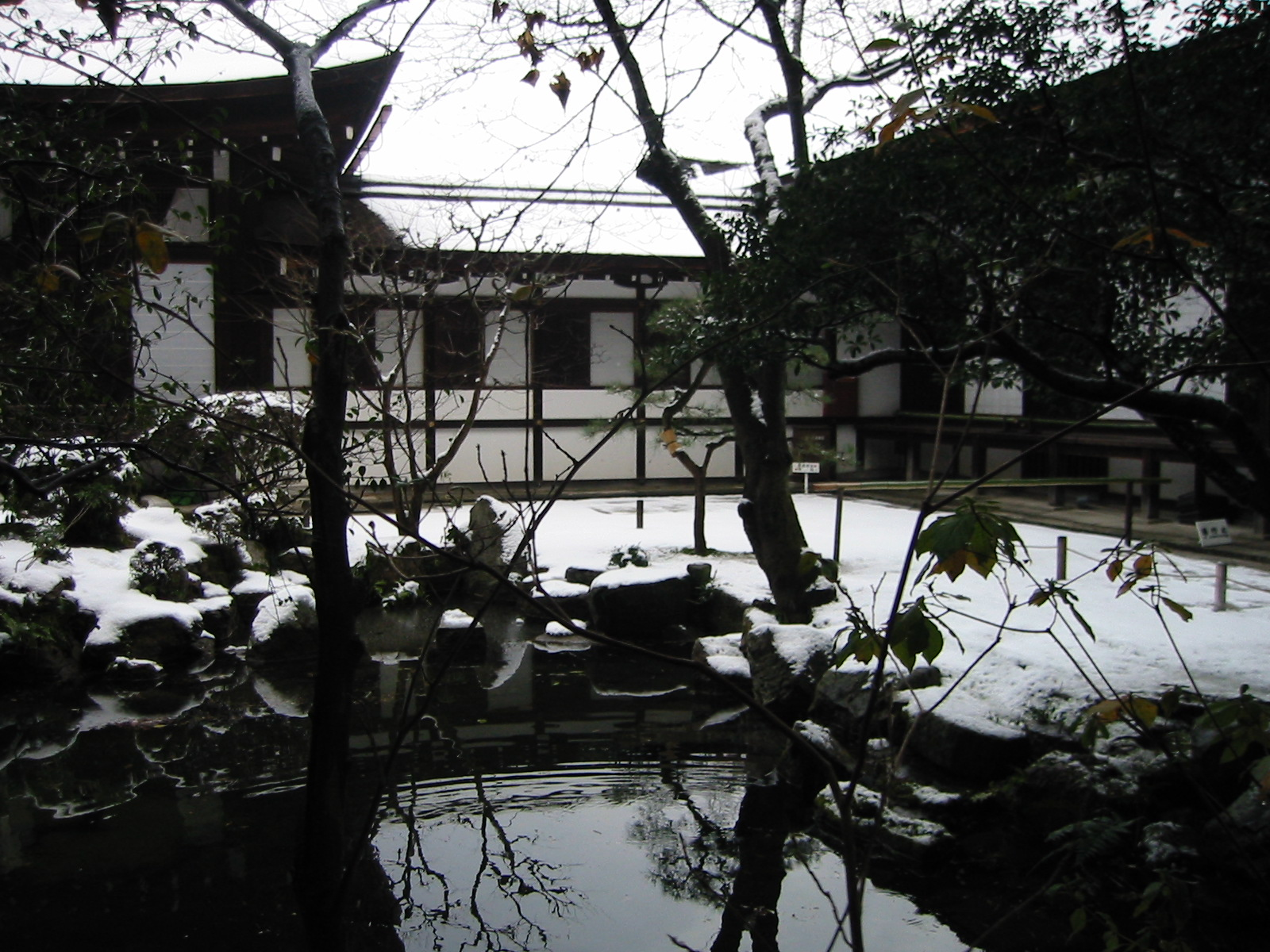
The pond behind Chion-in

An interesting feature inside the temple is the very squeaky boards, an example of a nightingale floor. The wooden boards were built with metal ends that would rub against the metal joints they were attached to, created a piercing noise as people step on them. This was intentionally done so that when the Tokugawa family stayed at the temple, they could detect unwanted intruders at night.

The interior of Chion-in is decorated with black, gold and cinnabar colors throughout. A baldacchino of fine metal work, and red, silk ropes and tassels adorn the area. Lotus plants in pots encased in beaten gold.

The introduction of wood being a fine art and working with contemporary art is drastically changed the way that religious buildings were built and decorated.

== 7 Wonders ==
=== Uguisubari-no-rōka ===
This is the Nightingale Hallway (Buddha's Vow). This 550m long hallway connects Mieidō and Shūedō. The Nightingale hallway was equipped with flooring that make the sound of the Nightingale when someone walks on them. It acts as a type of security system as the lighter someone tries to walk the more sound it makes. They say that the sound of the nightingale bird is meant to be a reminder to listen to Buddha's teachings.

=== Shiraki-no-hitsugi ===
This is the Plainwood Coffin (A symbol of Nonattachment to One's Life and Body). In the Sanmon, the bodies of Gomi Kin'uemon and his wife lie in plain coffins. These people built the gate and carved wooden statues of themselves. After the gate was completed, both Gomi Kin'uemon and his wife committed suicide. People still to this day who visit Chion-in cry for them.

=== Wasuregasa ===
This is the Forgotten Umbrella (A Symbol of Gratitude). This umbrella holds many different meanings, it is in Mieidō between the eaves on the southeast section. It is said to be a symbol of gratitude delivered by a white fox, promising to protect Chion-in. Another said it was simply forgotten by master carpenter, Hidari Jingorō. Lasty, it is said to protect Chion-in from fires because it has a connected relationship to water.

=== Nukesuzume ===
This is the Sparrows that Flew Away (A Symbol of Polishing One's Mind). The fusuma-e, or a painting on sliding doors, done by Kanō Nobumasa a painting featuring white Chrysanthemum flowers. According to legend sparrows were painted on but the birds look so real that they came to life and flew away.

=== Sanpō Shōmen Mamuki-no-Neko ===
This is the Cat That Sees in Three Directions (A Symbol of a Parent’s Heart). Located in Ōhōjō, the large guest house. This painting of a cat represents compassion of the Buddha and the heart of a parent. This cat seems to be looking at you at anywhere you may be look at it.

=== Ōshakushi ===
This is the Large Rice Paddle (A Symbol of the Buddha’s Salvation). This was a larger than average paddle, meant to serve a lot of people at once. This rice paddle, according to legend, was meant to save all of mankind. "Scoop" and "Save/rescue" are both pronounced Sukuu. This play on words was meant to symbolize Amida's compassion.

=== Uryūseki ===
This is the Cucumber Rock (A Symbol of Encouragement). This large rock said to predate Chion-in is in front of the Kuromon. Gozu Tennō, a deity, said that in one night gourds started to grow from this rock.

== Location ==
Directly to the north of Chion-in (and abutting) is the much smaller temple of Shōren-in. Directly to the south (and abutting) is Maruyama Park, which itself connects to Yasaka Shrine and thence Gion.

== Gallery ==
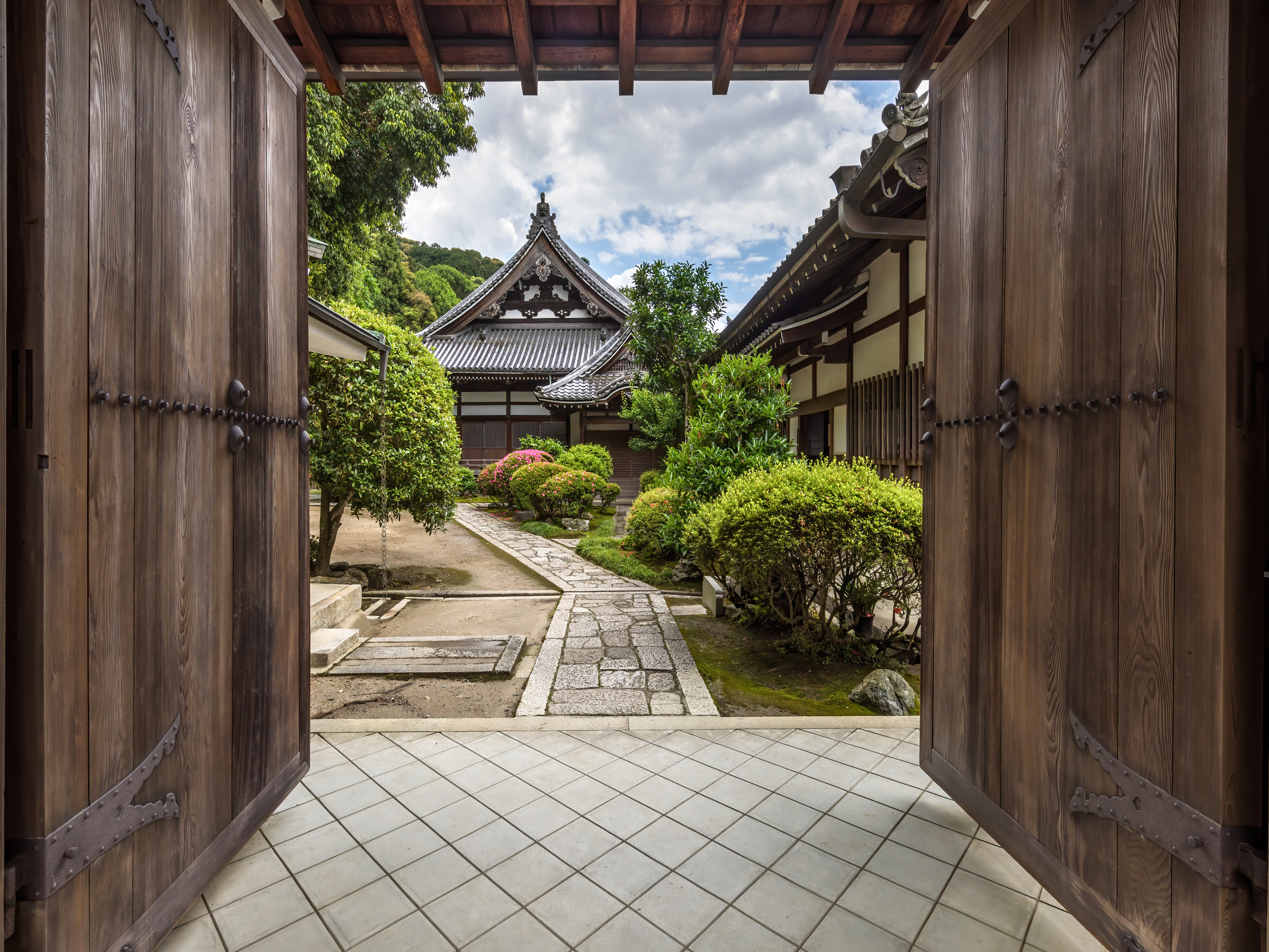
View on the garden of Isshinin Buddhist temple

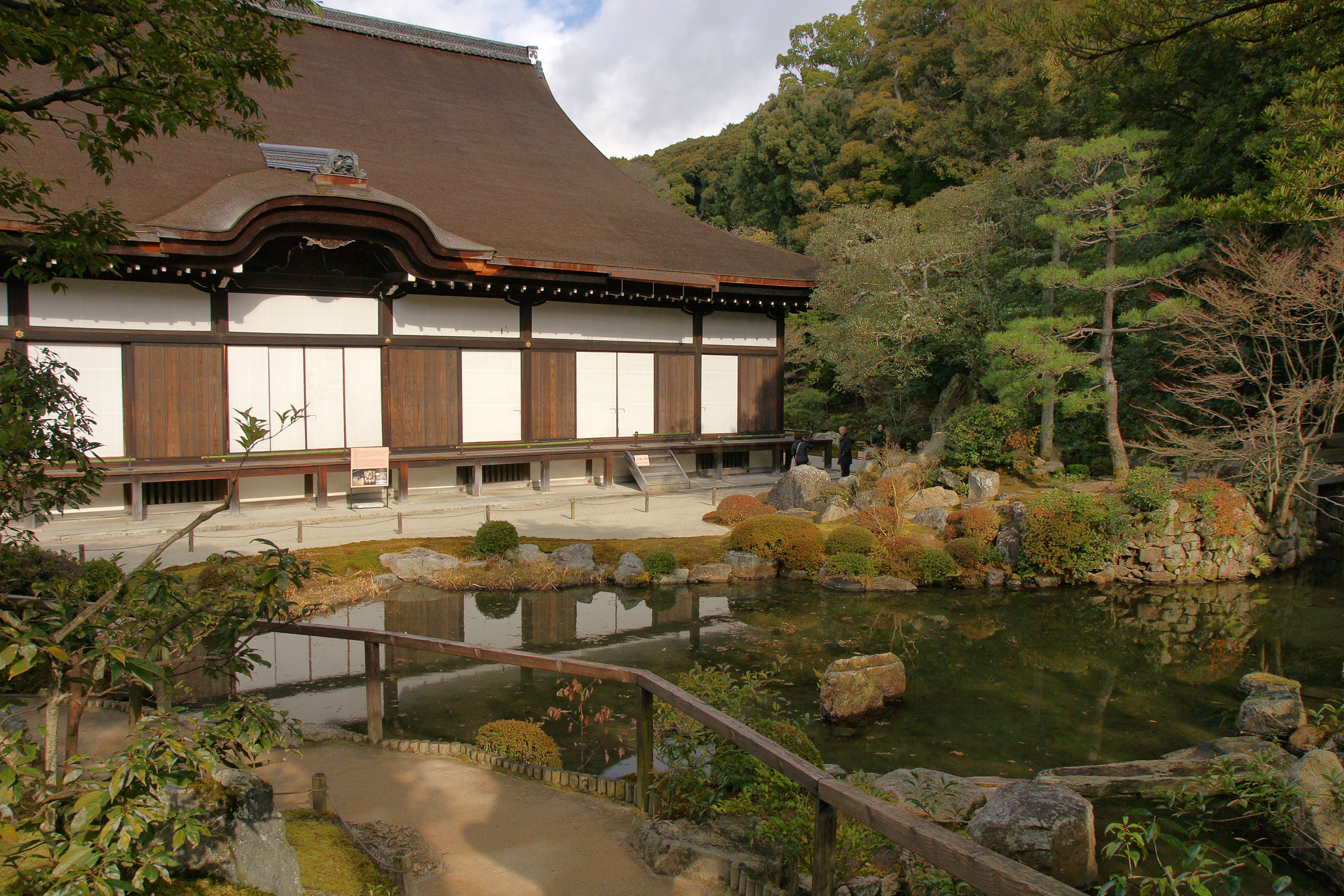
Ōhōjō

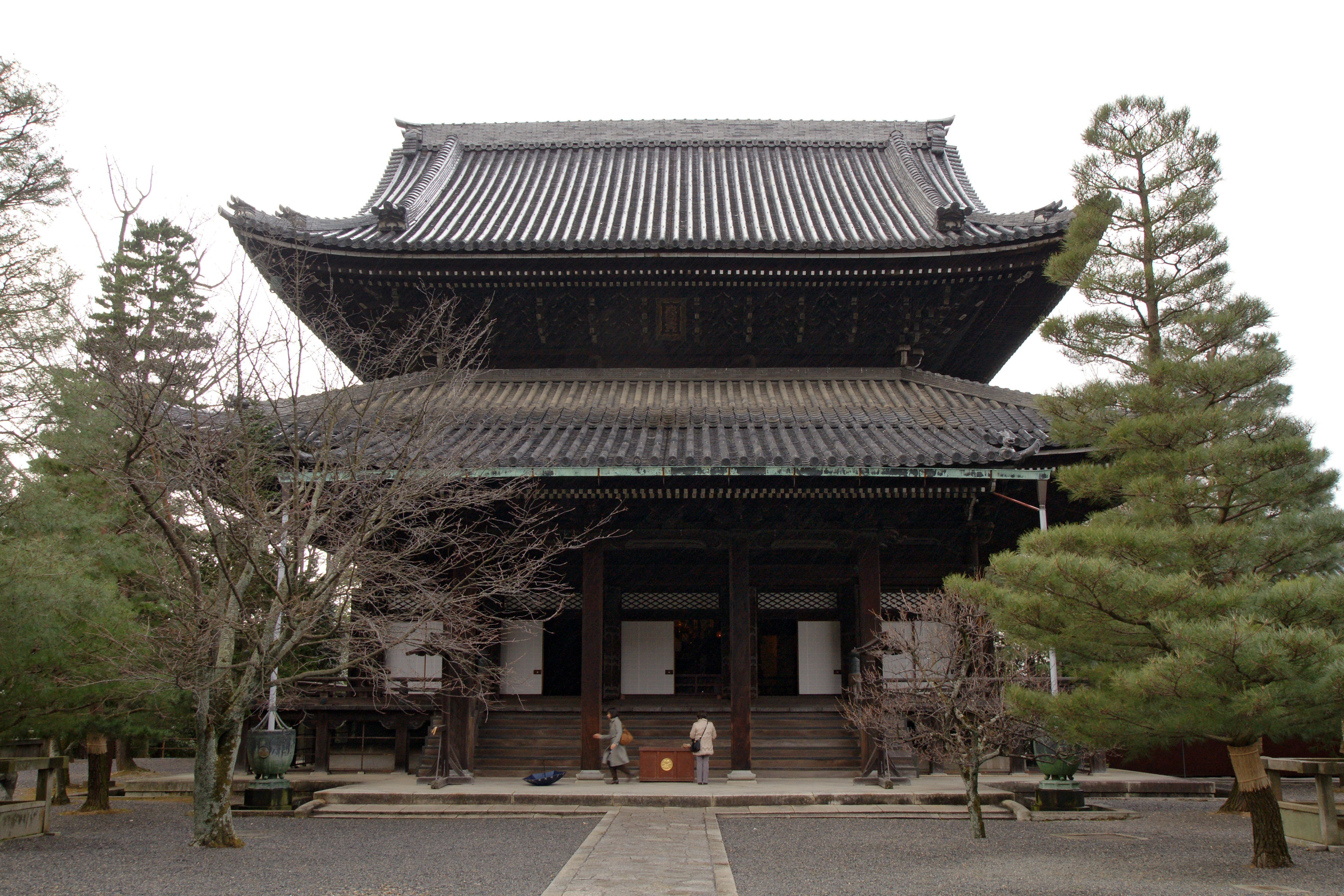
Amida-dō

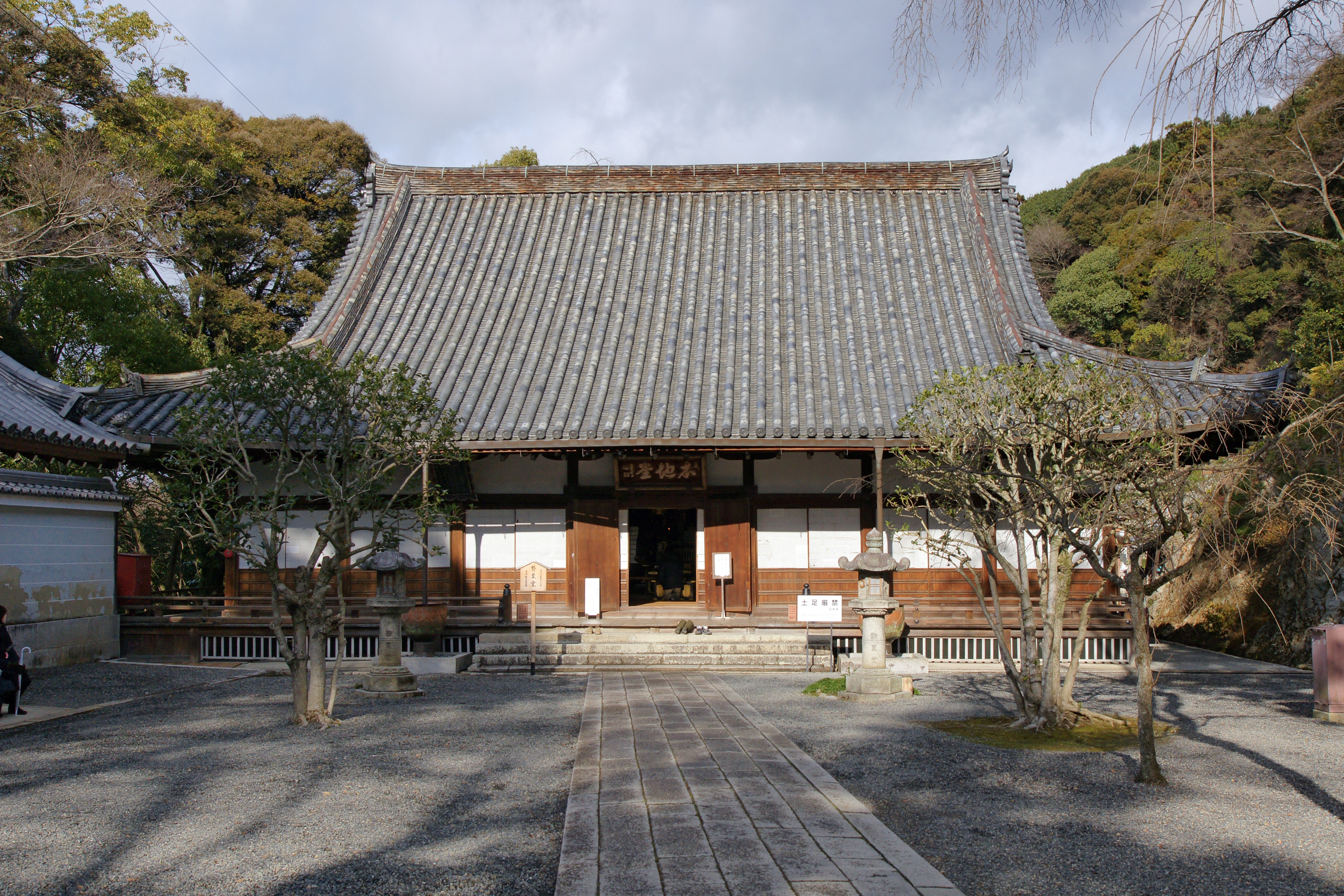
Seishi-dō

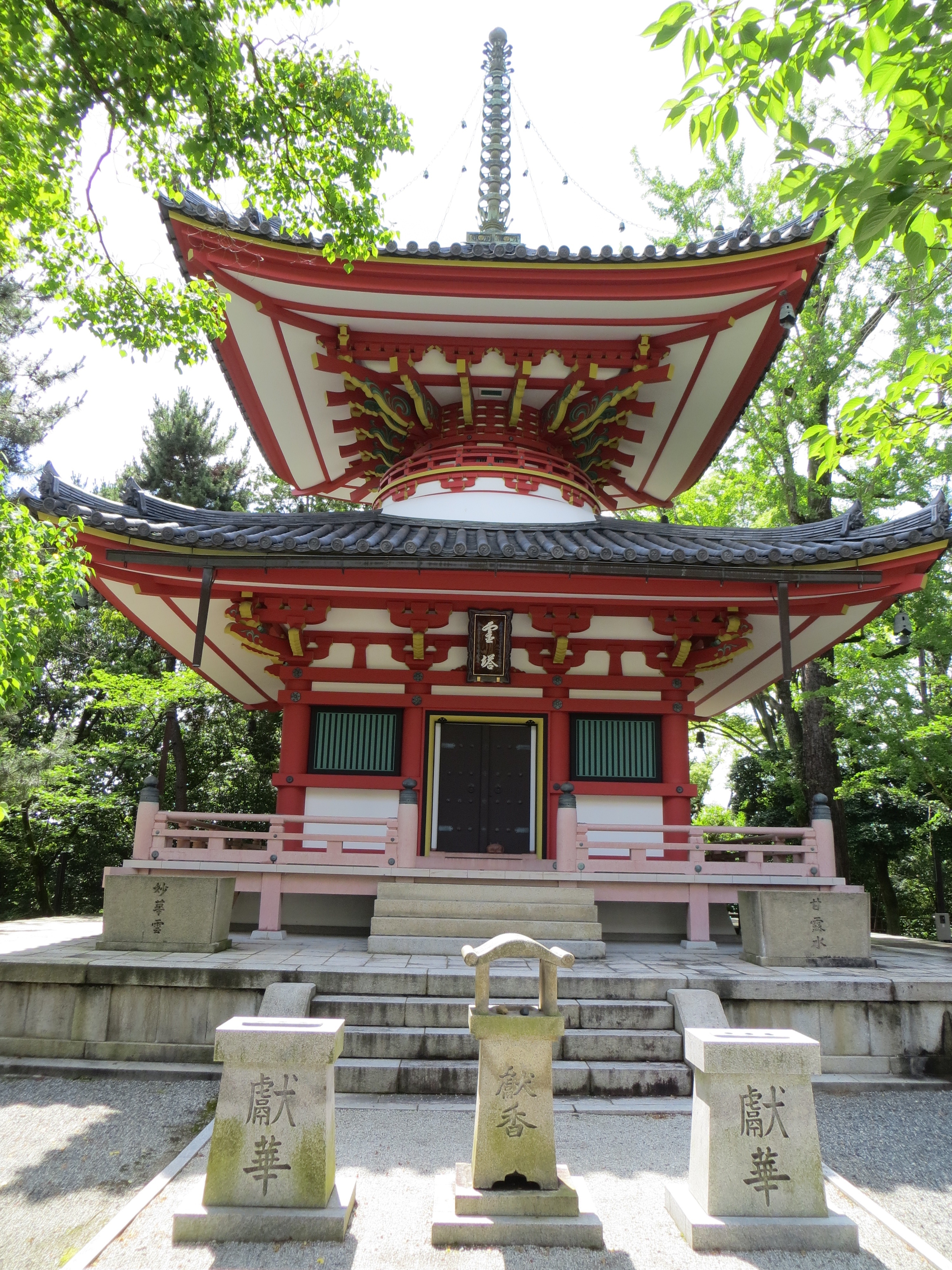
Tahōtō (pagoda)

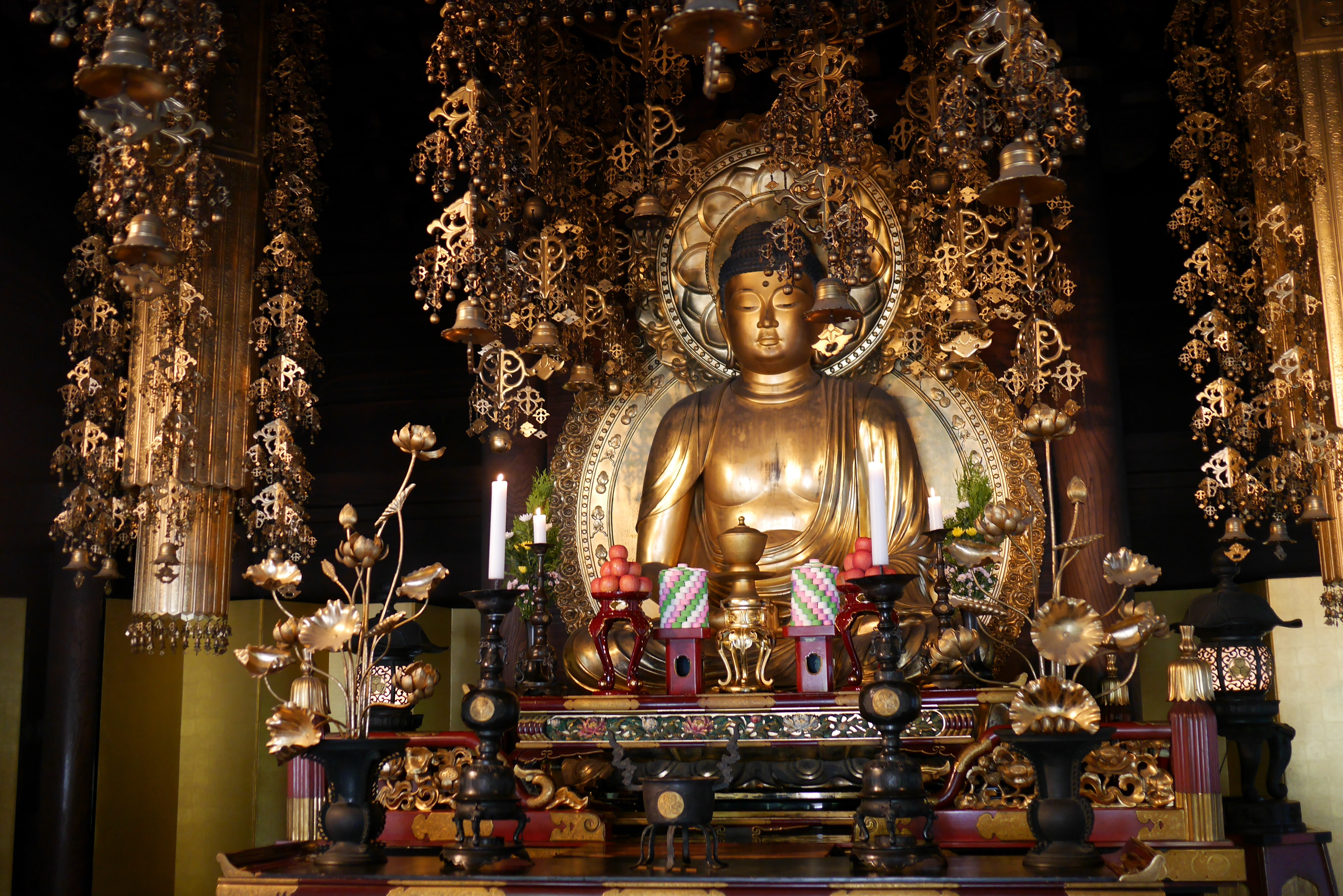

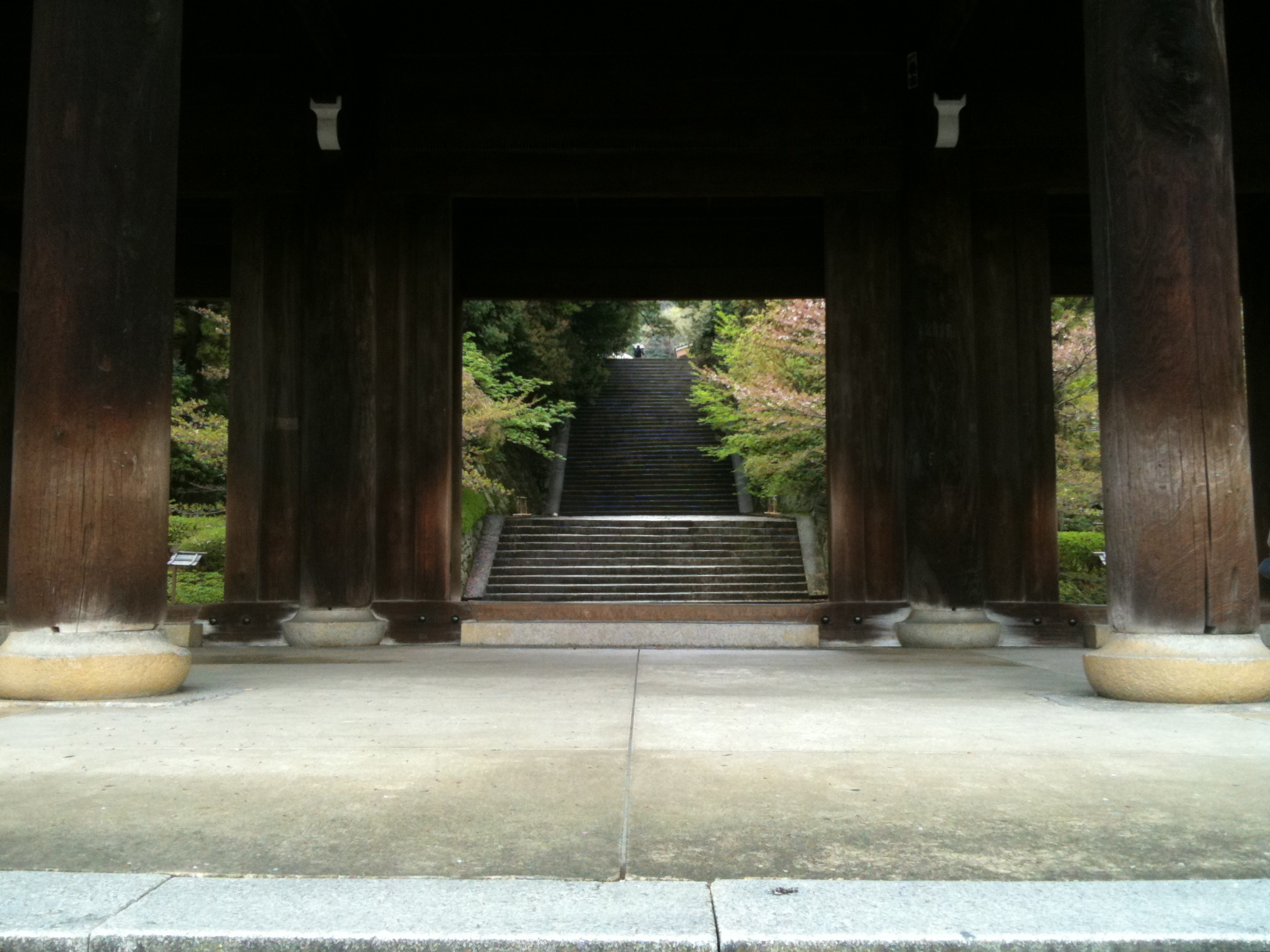
The front gate or sanmon (山門; lit. "Mountain Gate") of Chion-in

Raigō of Amida and Twenty-five Attendants - a painting by the temple that is designated a National Treasure

== See also ==
- List of National Treasures of Japan (temples)
- List of National Treasures of Japan (paintings)
- List of National Treasures of Japan (writings)
- Pure Land Buddhism
