= Buddhānusmṛti =

Buddhist meditation on the virtues of the Buddha

Buddhānusmṛti (Sanskrit; Pali: Buddhānussati), meaning "Buddha-mindfulness", is a common Buddhist meditation practice in all Buddhist traditions which involves meditating on a Buddha. The term can be translated as "remembrance, commemoration, recollection or mental contemplation of the Buddha." It is also one of the various recollections (anusmṛti) taught by the Buddha in the sutras.

Early Buddhist sources mostly focused on Gautama Buddha in their contemplation. Later Mahayana traditions like Pure Land Buddhism and Vajrayana also taught meditations focused on other Buddhas like Amitabha, Maitreya or Vairocana.

In East Asian Buddhism, mindfulness of the Buddha is one of the most popular forms of Buddhist practice, encompassing the more vocal oriented nianfo ("buddha recollection") and the more visualization focused Buddha contemplation (Ch: guanfo). In Vajrayana Buddhism, the central practice of deity yoga can be seen as a kind of Buddha mindfulness with numerous esoteric elements.

== Early Buddhist sources ==
The term Buddhānusmṛti appears in numerous Buddhist sources. The Early Buddhist Texts contain various passages that discuss the practice of Buddha mindfulness. The practice is often part of a schema of mindfulness practices called the ten recollections. In the Pali Nikayas, buddhānussaṭi is a practice which is said to lead all the way to nirvana:

“One thing, mendicants, when developed and cultivated, leads solely to disillusionment, dispassion, cessation, peace, insight, awakening, and extinguishment. What one thing? Recollection of the Buddha. This one thing, when developed and cultivated, leads solely to disillusionment, dispassion, cessation, peace, insight, awakening, and extinguishment [nirvana].” — AN 1.296

=== The Buddha mindfulness verse ===
A common verse (Sanskrit: gatha) from the early sources which is repeated as a Buddha mindfulness meditation is the 'Buddhānussati Gatha' which mentions nine qualities or epithets of the Buddha (Nava Guna). The Pali version is:

Iti’ pi so bhagavā arahaṃ sammāsambuddho vijjacaraṇasampanno sugato lokavidu anuttaro purisadammasārathi satthā devamanussānaṃ buddho bhagavā’ti.

This gatha can be translated in English as:

That Blessed One is perfected, a fully awakened Buddha, accomplished in knowledge and conduct, holy, knower of the world, supreme guide for those who wish to train, teacher of gods and humans, awakened, blessed.

This verse is widely chanted in Theravada Buddhism, and the Visuddhimagga also makes use of it. Its Sanskrit counterpart, which occurs in many Mahayana Sutras and in Āryatriratnānusmṛti sūtra, is given as:

ityapi buddho bhagavāṃstathāgato'rhan samyaksaṃbuddho vidyācaraṇasampannaḥ sugato lokavidanuttaraḥ puruṣadamyasārathiḥ śāstā devamanuṣyāṇāṃ buddho bhagavāniti

=== In the Pali suttas ===
Various EBT sutras discuss Buddha mindfulness. The Mahanama Sutta (1) of the Anguttara Nikaya begins by citing the Buddha mindfulness gatha as a way of recollecting the Buddha and then states how the practice can lead to meditative absorption (samadhi):

When a noble disciple recollects the Realized One their mind is not full of greed, hate, and delusion. At that time their mind is unswerving, based on the Realized One. A noble disciple whose mind is unswerving finds inspiration in the meaning and the teaching, and finds joy connected with the teaching. When they’re joyful, rapture springs up. When the mind is full of rapture, the body becomes tranquil. When the body is tranquil, they feel bliss. And when they’re blissful, the mind becomes immersed in samādhi. This is called a noble disciple who lives in balance among people who are unbalanced, and lives untroubled among people who are troubled. They’ve entered the stream of the teaching and developed the recollection of the Buddha. — AN 11.11

Another Mahanama sutra (AN 11.12) has the Buddha tell Mahanama "You should develop this recollection of the Buddha while walking, standing, sitting, lying down, while working, and while at home with your children." Another passage which illustrates Buddha mindfulness is found in the very end of the Sutta Nipata of the Pali Canon. In this text, a Brahmin named Pingiya praises the Buddha and when he is asked why he doesn't follow him everywhere, Pingiya says he is too old to be able to do so. Then he states:

there is no moment for me, however small, that is spent away from Gotama, from this universe of wisdom, this world of understanding...with constant and careful vigilance it is possible for me to see him with my mind as clearly with my eyes, in night as well as day. And since I spend my nights revering him, there is not, to my mind, a single moment spent away from him.

At the end of this sutta, the Buddha himself states that Pingiya will also go to enlightenment. Paul Williams writes that this passages shows that some early Buddhist followers were making use of meditation "to be constantly in the presence of the Buddha and constantly revere him."

=== In the Ekottarika-āgama ===
The Ekottarika-āgama (EA) contains various unique passages on buddhānusmṛti not found in the Pali Nikayas. The phrase namo buddhāya (nan wu fo 南無佛) is also found in this text as a common way to praise and commemorate the Buddha. Another sutra has Maitreya state that "Those who offer coloured silk and all kinds of things to Buddhist temples, and who chant ‘namo buddhāya’, will all come to where I am." It also states that those who worship the Buddhas will eventually reach nirvana. Another Ekottarika-āgama sutra mentions a different phrase: namas tathāgatāya.

EA III, 1 (Taishô Vol. II, p. 554a7-b9) states that buddhānusmṛti on the image and qualities of the Buddha can lead to the unconditioned, to amrta (the deathless), to nirvana, as well as magic power. This sutra states:

How does one practise buddhanusmrti, so that one then has renown, achieves the great fruit...and arrives at Nirvana? The Lord said: A bhiksu correct in body and correct in mind sits crosslegged and focuses his thought in front of him. Without entertaining any other thought he earnestly calls to mind [anusmr-] the Buddha. He contemplates the image of the Tathagata without taking his eyes off it. Not taking his eyes off it he then calls to mind the qualities of the Tathagata...

The sutra goes on to describe the various qualities of the Buddha, including his "body made of vajra", his ten powers, his perfect moral qualities, his never ending samadhis and his wisdom (prajña).

Another EA sutra (Taishô Vol. II, pp. 739bl0—740a24) attests to the great power of the practice of recollection. In this sutra, a selfish layman named Virasena gets a prediction from the Buddha that he will be reborn in hell unless he repents. The layman then practices the ten recollections (the first of which is buddhānusmṛti) and is reborn in a heaven. The Buddha then states: "Should a being practise the ten anusmrtis with uninterrupted faith, even if only for the time it takes to milk a cow, then his merit will be immeasurable."

Yet another EA sutra (T2, no. 125, p. 566a.) describes the qualities of a Buddha one should contemplate:

He is the one person appearing in the world [who belongs to] the kind of living beings [who have] an exceedingly extended lifespan. [He has] a shiny and smooth physical appearance and a vigorous physical strength. [He radiates] infinite joy [and possesses] a harmonious and refined voice. This is why, monks, you should always concentrate and devote yourselves single-mindedly to buddhānusmṛti.

Furthermore, the EA version of the Anāthapiṇḍikovāda-sutta has Ānanda teach the recollections to a dying Anāthapiṇḍada, claiming that the recollection of the three jewels (Buddha, Dharma, Sangha) will lead to liberation and prevent bad rebirths:

the virtue / benefit [from these recollections] is immeasurable: at the end of [your] life, [you will] obtain the sweet dew (amṛta) of liberation. If good men or good women remember the three honourable [refuges], i.e. the Buddha, the dharma, and the community, they will not at the end of [their] lives fall into the three bad realms of existence. If good men or good women remember the three honourable [refuges] they will without fail [be reborn] in a good place, in heaven or among the humans.

== Theravada ==
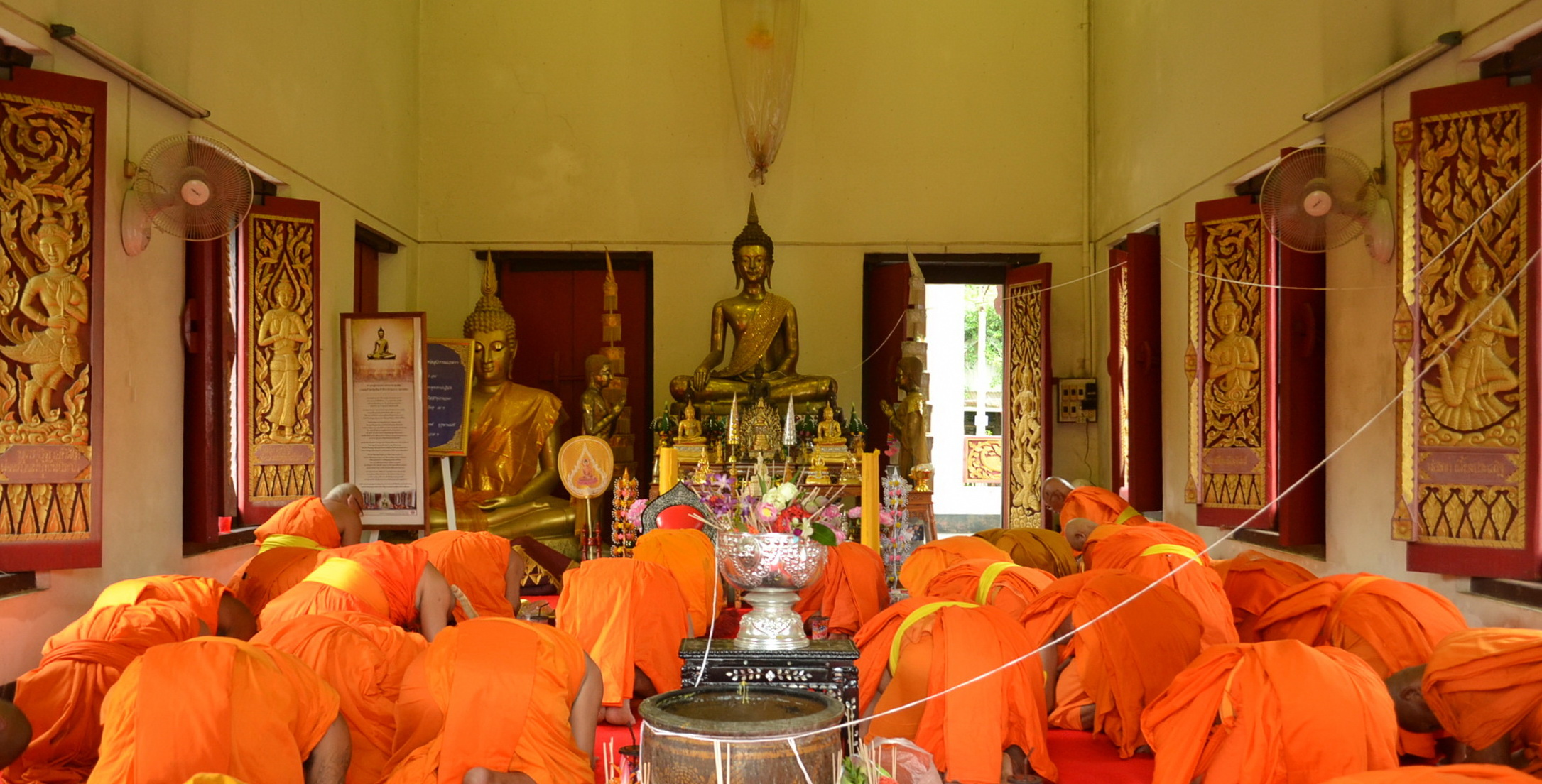
Thai monks bowing before a Buddha statue.

In all Theravada countries chanting, devotion (bhatti) and worship (puja) is a big part of lay and monastic Buddhist practice, and devotional chants which praise the qualities of the Buddha are widely used. Likewise, worship (puja), bowing, making offerings to and revering Buddha statues on a shrine are also important practices for Theravada Buddhists.

Buddhānussati is considered one of the four "Guardian meditations", as well as part of the "Ten Recollections" and the "forty meditation subjects" (Kammaṭṭhāna) which also includes recollection of the Dharma, Sangha, morality, generosity and Devas. According to Thanissaro Bhikkhu, recollection of the Buddha is meant to "induce a sense of joy and confidence (pasada) in the practice" that "can bring the mind to concentration and cleanse it of defilement."

Buddhagosa, a major Theravada Buddhist scholar, outlines a Buddha mindfulness practice in detail in his Visuddhimagga and he also explains its many benefits. According to Buddhaghosa, the results of this meditation include: "the fullness of faith, mindfulness, understanding, and merit....he conquers fear and dread....he comes to feel as if he were living in the Master's presence. And his body...becomes as worthy of veneration as a shrine room. His mind tends towards the plane of the Buddhas."

The Visuddhimagga also mentions that the practice can lead to arhatship by suppressing the hindrances:

Still, though this is so, they can be brought to mind by an ordinary man too, if he possesses the special qualities of purified virtue, and the rest. For when he is recollecting the special qualities of the Buddha, etc., even only according to hearsay, his consciousness settles down, by virtue of which the hindrances are suppressed. In his supreme gladness he initiates insight, and he even attains to Arahantship, like the Elder Phussadeva who dwelt at Katakandhakára.

Buddhaghosa's Dhammapada Commentary (Dhammapada Aṭṭhakathā) also contains some stories illustrating mindfulness of the Buddha, such as the story of Venerable Vakkali. The story of Elder Vakkali centers on the practice of gazing upon the Buddha as a form of devotion and spiritual engagement. Vakkali, captivated by the Buddha’s physical appearance, renounced the world solely to remain in the Teacher’s presence, neglecting traditional monastic practices such as scriptural recitation and meditation. Despite the Buddha's admonition that true vision lies in seeing the Dhamma rather than the physical body, Vakkali could not detach himself. When the Buddha deliberately distanced himself during the rains retreat, Vakkali despaired and contemplated suicide. At this critical moment, the Buddha projected an image of himself to Vakkali atop Vulture Peak, offering verses of reassurance and compassion. This vision, accompanied by the Buddha’s compassionate call, catalyzed Vakkali’s realization; as he leapt into the air in joy, he achieved Arahatship mid-flight. The narrative illustrates how even a deeply personal, devotional fixation on the Buddha’s form can become a doorway to ultimate insight, provided it is skillfully redirected toward the realization of the Dhamma.

According to the 'Netti Sutta' of the Abhidhamma Pitaka a yogin who wishes to practice Buddhānussaṭi can use Buddha statues to practice.

In the Tantric Theravada tradition, Buddha-mindfulness visualizations are also practiced. Dhammakaya meditation, which was influenced by this Southern tantric tradition, uses the visualization of a clear crystal Buddha image at the center of the body and the repetition of the mantra Sammā-Arahaṃ.

== Sravakayana texts ==
Teachings on buddha-mindfulness continued to develop in the later Śrāvakayāna (non-Mahayanist) traditions. Some sources expand on the idea that reflecting on the Buddha and his qualities can be a way to partake in his power or qualities. For example, the Milindapañhā states that "though a man should have lived a hundred years an evil life, yet if, at the moment of death, thoughts of the Buddha should enter his mind [maraṇakāle ca ekaṃ buddhaguṇaṃ satiṃ paṭilabheyya], he will be reborn among the devas." The monk Nâgasena explains this teaching by comparing it to how heavy things can float on the water if they are carried by a boat.

Northern Abhidharma sources (Sarvastivada) also discuss buddha-mindfulness. The key Abhidharma text by Vasubandhu, the Abhidharmakośa, states:

All intelligent persons who reflect on the threefold perfection of the Tathāgatas necessarily produce a profound affection, a profound respect with respect to them.” … It is enough to know that the Buddhas…are like mines of jewels. Nevertheless fools…understand in vain the extolling of the merits of the Buddha and they do not conceive affection for the Buddha or his Dharma. The wise on the contrary, understand the explanation of the qualities of the Buddha, conceiving, with respect to the Buddha and his Dharma, a mind of faith which penetrates to the marrow of their bones. These persons through this single mind of faith—overcome infinite bad karma, get excellent rebirths and attain nirvāṇa. That is why the Tathāgata is called the ultimate merit field.

Non-Mahayana narrative texts also contain numerous examples of people who attain birth in the heaven realms through simple acts of devotion even though they lack much merit. Texts like the Mahāvastu, the avadānas, the Dhammapāda Commentary and various jātakas all mention how calling out “Homage to the Buddha” (Namo Buddhāya) in a life‑threatening emergency may lead survival or to a heavenly birth.

== In Mahayana Buddhism ==
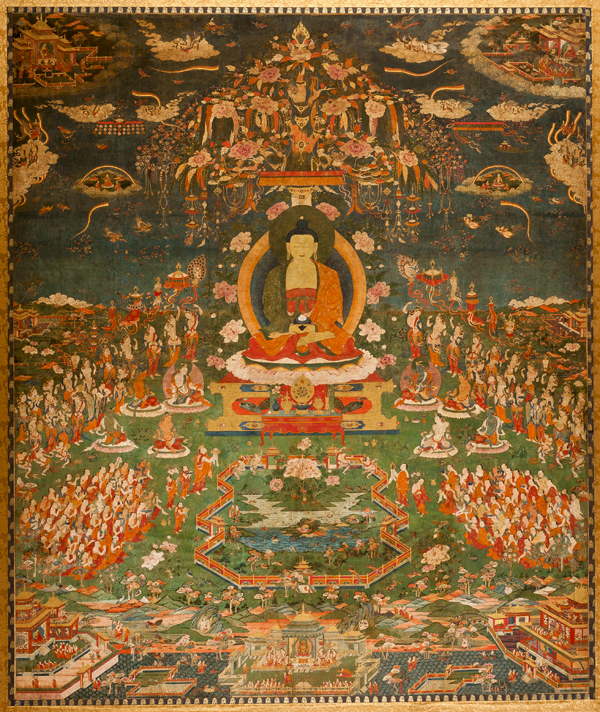
Amitabha in Sukhavati Paradise, Tibetan, circa 1700, Ink, pigments, and gold on cotton, San Antonio Museum of Art.

In Mahayana Buddhism Buddhānusmṛti and related mindfulness practices may be directed towards Shakyamuni Buddha or to uniquely Mahayana Buddhas and bodhisattvas such as Amitabha, Maitreya, Guanyin, or Vairocana. These practices also sometimes involve mental visualization of their physical qualities, bodies and their Buddha fields (also known as Pure Lands). According to Paul Williams, the development of Mahayana Buddha mindfulness practices can be traced to the Buddhist meditation teachers of Kashmir who composed several texts which emphasized mindfulness of Buddhas.

=== In the Prajñāpāramitā Sutras ===
Mindfulness of the Buddha is found in numerous Mahayana sutras. For example, the Teaching of Manjusri 700 Line Prajñāpāramitā Sutra (Mañjuśrīparivartāparaparyāyā Saptaśatikāprajñāpāramitā) calls the practice the "single practice samadhi", stating that meditators:

should live in seclusion, cast away discursive thoughts, not cling to the appearance of things, concentrate their minds on a Buddha, and recite his name single-mindedly. They should keep their bodies erect and, facing the direction of that Buddha, meditate upon him continuously. If they can maintain mindfulness of the Buddha without interruption from moment to moment, then they will be able to see all Buddhas of the past, present, and future right in each moment.

Similarly, in Kumarajiva's Pañcaviṃśatisāhasrikā-prajñāpāramitā (摩訶般若波羅蜜經, T8, no. 223), the Buddha states:

Place the seeds for [your future] happy merit in this ‘Transformation Buddha’ (化佛), or where he is. If there are good men and good women who with a respectful mind only [focus on practicing] buddhānusmṛti, the effect of this good root will end [their] sufferings and produce limitless happiness. Subhūti, set up [the practice of performing] buddhānusmṛti with a respectful heart. If there are good men and good women who [practice] buddhānusmṛti while scattering [even] a single flower into space, [their] sufferings will finally end [and they will produce] limitless happy [retributions]. Subhūti, set up [the practice of performing] buddhānusmṛti with a respectful heart, set up [the practice of performing] buddhānusmṛti [while] scattering flowers. If there are persons that praise/recite namo buddhāya [even only] once [their] sufferings will finally end [and they will produce] limitless happy [retributions].

Buddha mindfulness is also discussed in the Dazhidulun, the earliest Perfection of Wisdom commentary. It recommends "buddhānusmṛti-samādhi" and the recitation of the phrase "namo buddhāya" to laypersons.

=== Pratyutpanna Samādhi Sūtra ===
The most popular Buddha in East Asian Mahayana is Amitabha Buddha, the central Buddha of the popular Asian Pure Land tradition. One of the earliest sutras which mentions mindfulness of Amitabha Buddha is the Pratyutpanna Samādhi Sūtra (translated into Chinese in 179 CE by Lokakshema). The sutra describes a Buddha mindfulness practice called the Pratyutpannabuddha Saṃmukhāvasthita Samādhi ("the Samādhi for Encountering Face-to-Face the Buddhas of the Present") which can lead to a vision of the Buddhas after which one can worship them directly and even directly receive teachings from them.

The practice of contemplation of the Buddha is described in this sutra as follows:

what is the calling to mind of the Buddha [buddhānusmṛti]? Namely, he who concentrates on the Tathāgata thus: 'He, the Tathāgata, Arhat, Samyaksambuddha, endowed with knowledge and conduct, the Sugata, Knower of the World, Tamer of men to be tamed, the Supreme One, Teacher of Gods and Men, the Buddha, the Lord; endowed with the Thirty-two Marks of the Great Man and a body resembling the colour of gold; like a bright, shining, and well-established golden image; well-adorned like a pillar of gems; expounding the Dharma amidst an assembly of disciples ...'; he who obtains the samādhi of Emptiness by thus concentrating on the Tathāgata without apprehending him, he is known as one who calls to mind the Buddha.

The sutra also describes mindfulness of the Buddha as follows "with undistracted thought [aviksiptacittena] he concentrates [manasi-kr-] on the Tathagata."

This sutra also mentions how one can be reborn in Amitabha's buddhafield (or pure land), something which is a major concern in contemporary Mahayana Buddhism. The Pratyutpanna states that bodhisattvas meditate on Amitabha Buddha again and again and due to this practice they are able to see him in a vision or a dream. Then Amitabha Buddha says "If you wish to come and be born in my realm, you must always call me to mind again and again, you must always keep this thought in mind without letting up, and thus you will succeed in coming to be born in my realm."

However, the sutra also warns that one must train extensively in the practice and also maintain strict ethics to attain this samadhi. It also states that in meditation, one must understand and view the Buddhas properly as being empty. The sutra warns that one should never "think erroneously about" (manyate), "apprehend" (upalabhate), "fixate on" (abhinivisate), "cognise" (samjânâti), "imagine" (kalpati), or "discriminate" (vikalpayati) the Buddha in this meditation. Thus, according to the sutra "he who obtains the samadhi of Emptiness by thus concentrating on the Tathagata without apprehending him, he is known as one who calls to mind the Buddha." According to Paul Harrison, the main meaning of this is that the visions of the Buddha in meditation should not be grasped at as a substantial entity or to be apprehended as an objectively existing entity (since no such substantial thing exists).

=== In the Pure land sutras ===
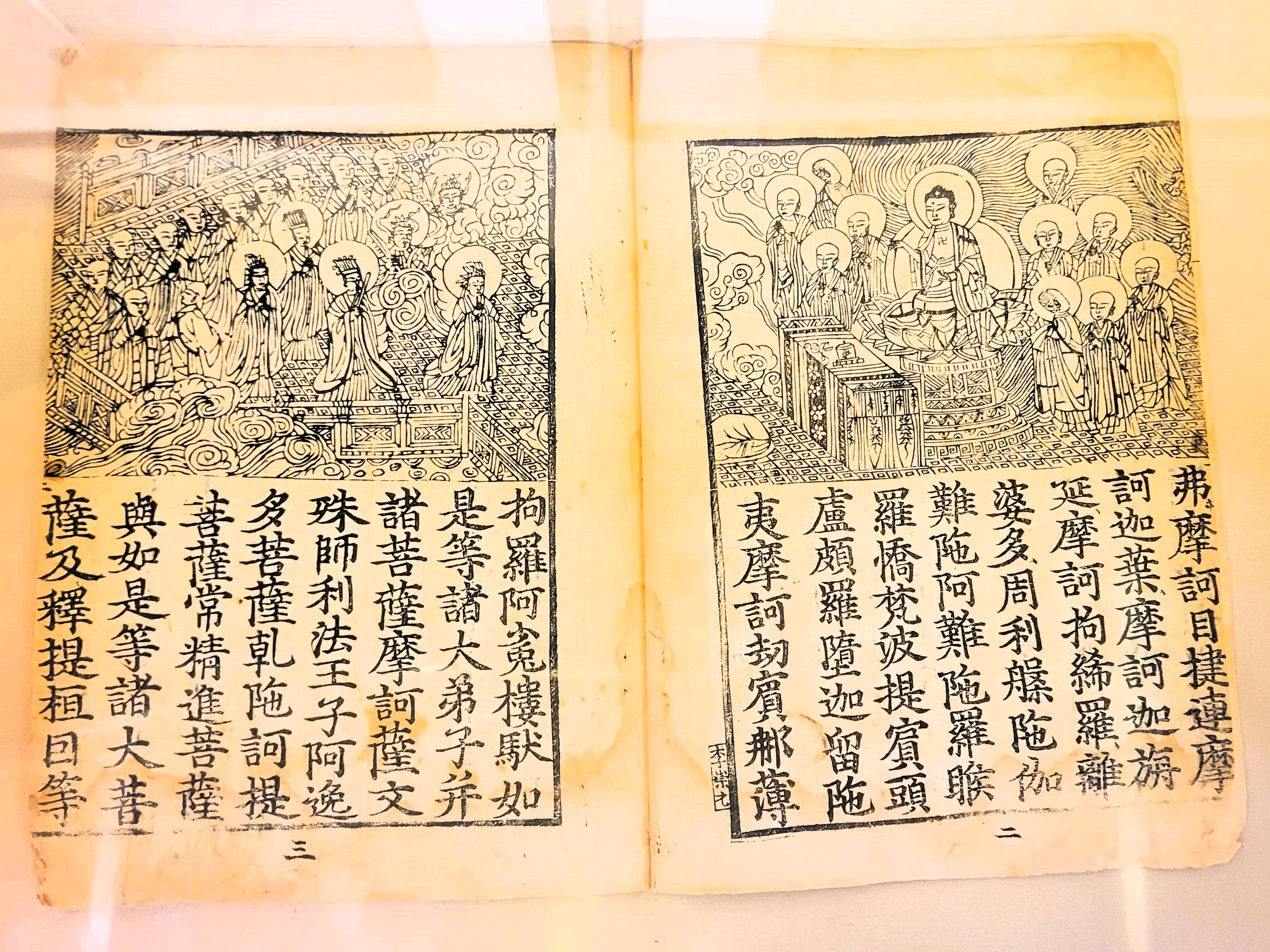
Amitabha Buddha Sutra, by Deokjusa Temple

The Shorter Sukhāvatīvyūha Sūtra says that if one maintains Buddha mindfulness on the Buddha Amitabha, upon death one will have a vision of Amitabha who will then take them to the Pure Land:

Śāriputra, if, among good men and good women, there are those who, having heard of Amitābha Buddha, single-mindedly uphold His name for one day, two days, three days, four days, five days, six days, or seven days, without being distracted, then upon their dying, Amitābha Buddha, together with a holy multitude, will appear before them. When these people die, their minds will not be demented and they will be reborn in Amitābha Buddha's Land of Ultimate Bliss.

The Shorter Sukhāvatīvyūha Sūtra also states that its Amitabha focused Buddhānusmṛti practice will lead to the state of non-retrogression (avaivartika), a state in which a bodhisattva's progress cannot be reversed:

Śāriputra, if there are good men and good women who have heard and upheld this sūtra, and have heard Buddhas’ names, they are protected and remembered by all Buddhas. They will never regress from their resolve to attain anuttara-samyak-saṁbodhi. Therefore, Śāriputra, you all should believe and accept my words and other Buddhas’ words. If there are those who have resolved, are now resolving, or will resolve to be reborn in Amitābha Buddha's land, they will never regress from their resolve to attain anuttara-samyak-saṁbodhi, whether they have already been reborn, are now being reborn, or will be reborn in that land. Therefore, Śāriputra, if, among good men and good women, there are those who believe [my words], they should resolve to be reborn in that land.

Other Pure Land sutra like the Contemplation Sutra, include lengthy descriptions of the Buddha Amitabha's physical qualities and of his Pure land which lead to birth in the Pure Land of Sukhavati, where one can worship Amitabha directly and receive teachings from him. The Contemplation Sutra also states that when one contemplates the Buddha, our mind is one with the Buddha:

Therefore, when you perceive a buddha in your mind, it is your mind that possesses the thirty-two prominent features and the eighty secondary attributes; your mind becomes a buddha; your mind is a buddha; and the wisdom of the buddhas – true, universal, and ocean-like – arises from this mind. Therefore, you should single-mindedly fix your thoughts and clearly perceive the Buddha, Tathāgata, Arhat, Samyaksambuddha.

The sutra also contains a passage which discusses the simplest of all Pure Land practices, which is the mere recitation of the name of Amitabha. This is meant for practitioners of the lowest abilities. This passage, which makes the path universally accessible, became an important text for the Pure Land tradition. It states:

When the life of such a foolish person is about to end, he meets a virtuous and learned teacher who comforts him in various ways, expounds for him the exquisite teachings, and urges him to be mindful of the Buddha [念佛 nembutsu]. But this person is too tormented by pain to be mindful of the Buddha. Then the virtuous friend says, ‘If you cannot be mindful of the Buddha, you should say that you take refuge in the Buddha of Immeasurable Life.’ And so, with a sincere mind and an uninterrupted voice, this per- son says ‘Namu Amida Butsu’ [南無阿彌陀佛] manifesting ten moments of thought and because he says the Buddha’s name, with every thought-moment, the evil karma binding him to birth-and-death for eighty koṭis of kalpas is eliminated.

=== In other Mahayana sutras ===
There are other Mahayana sutras which discuss mindfulness of the Buddha. The Lotus sutra discusses devotional practices to the Buddha in various places, including praising the chanting of the Buddha's name in chapter two. According to chapter two of the Lotus Sutra:

Those who joyfully praised the qualities of the buddhas with various songs or even with a single low-pitched sound, have certainly attained the path of the buddhas. Those who, even with distracted minds, have offered a single flower to a painted image, will in time see innumerable buddhas. Or those who have done obeisance to images, or merely pressed their palms together, or raised a single hand, or nodded their heads, will in due time see immeasurable buddhas. They will attain the highest path and extensively save innumerable sentient beings. They will enter nirvana without residue, just as a fire goes out after its wood is exhausted. Those who, even with distracted minds, entered a stupa compound and chanted but once, “Homage to the Buddha!”, have certainly attained the path of the buddhas.

Another sutra which teaches Buddhānusmṛti is the Sūtra on the Bodhisattvas’ Concentration on Buddha Commemoration (Taisho no. 414) and a parallel version of the text which appears in the Section of the Bodhisattvas’ Concentration on Buddha Commemoration of the Mahāsaṃnipāta (Taisho no. 415).

Another set of Mahayana sutras which discuss Buddhānusmṛti are the so-called "Contemplation sutras" (Chinese: 觀經, guan jing). This set of scriptures includes the Amitayurdhyana Sutra as well as other texts like the Sūtra on the Ocean-like Samādhi of the Visualization of the Buddha (Guan Fo Sanmei Hai Jing, Taisho no. 643) and the Sutra on the Contemplation of Maitreya Bodhisattva's Ascent to Rebirth in Tusita Heaven (Guan Mile Pusa Shangsheng Doushuaitian Jing). The Sūtra on the Ocean-like Samādhi tells of a prince who is taught by a monk to recite namo buddhāya near a stupa. This leads to a night time vision of the Buddha and to future travels to buddhafields due to his attainment of the "gate of buddha-mindfulness" (buddhānusmṛti-samādhi-mukha). The Mahāsaṃnipāta section meanwhile, calls the gate of buddha-mindfulness "the king among concentrations" which can complete the bodhisattva path.

Another sutra which discusses the "gate of buddha-mindfulness" (buddhānusmṛti-samādhi-mukha) is the ‘Gaṇḍavyūha chapter’ of the Avataṃsaka-sūtra (Taisho no. 279). This sutra actually outlines twenty gates of buddha-mindfulness.

=== Indian treatises ===
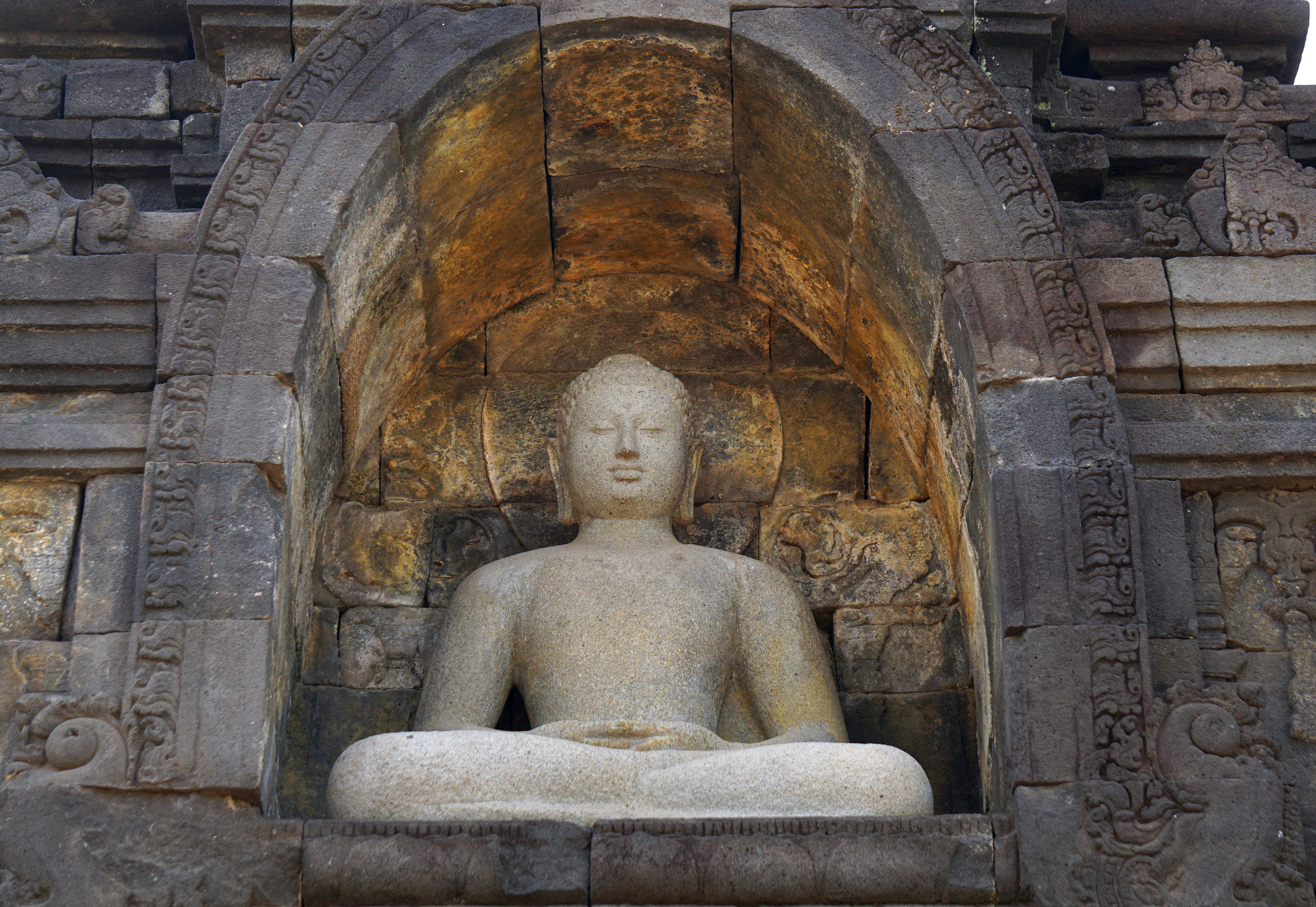
Indic style Amitabha from Borobudur, Indonesia

Various Indian Buddhist treatises (shastras) discuss the practice of Buddhānusmṛti. The Indian thinker Nagarjuna discusses the practice in various sources, including in his Dasabhumika-vibhāsā (Commentary on Dashabhumikasutra). In chapter nine of this treatise (which only survives in Chinese translation in the Chinese Buddhist canon), Nagarjuna mentions the "easy path" (易行品第九) of Buddha mindfulness that the Buddhas have taught as a skillful means (for those who are weak and lack vigor) that can lead one to the stage of irreversibility [avaivartikabhūmi]. According to Nagarjuna, if one wishes to practice this method, one should "bear in mind" the buddhas of the ten directions and "invoke their names". He also cites a verse which states:

If a person wishes to swiftly reach the ground of irreversibility, he should, with a reverential mind, take up and maintain the practice of invoking these buddhas’ names.

He also cites a sutra called Sutra Spoken in Response to the Questions of the Youth Precious Moon which speaks of a Buddha called "Meritorious Qualities" who has a pure land called Sorrowless. According to this sutra "if there is a son or daughter of good family who but hears this buddha's name and is then able to have faith and accept him, such a person will immediately achieve irreversibility with respect to the attainment of anuttarasamyaksaṃbodhi."

Nagarjuna then explains ten different Buddhas and their qualities. He also lists other Buddhas and bodhisattvas that one may invoke to achieve the state of irreversibility. Nagarjuna also singles out Amitabha and includes some verses in praise of this Buddha.

Yogacara masters also discussed the practice. It is found in Vasubandhu's Discourse on the Pure Land (Jìngtǔ lùn 浄土論) and in Asanga's ‘Commentary on Buddha Commemoration’ (Buddhānusmṛti-vṛtti, Tibetan: Sangs rgyas rjes su dran pa’i ‘grel pa).

Vasubandhu's Discourse focuses specifically on Amitabha and his pure land of Sukhavati. Vasubandhu outlines five main "gates" of recollecting the Buddha: the Gate of Worship, the Gate of Praise, the Gate of Aspiration, the Gate of Contemplation, and the Gate of Merit Transference. According to Vasubandhu, the worship gate is related to using bodily actions to worship the Buddha by bowing and so on, while the gate of praise makes use of words: "One calls the Name of that Tathagata in accordance with that Tathagata's Light, which is the embodiment of Wisdom, and in accordance with the significance of the Name, for one wishes to practice in accordance with reality and attain unity with it." The gate of aspiration is to wish to be born in the Pure land, while the gate of transference means that one dedicates all merit to rebirth in the pure land. Lastly, the gate of contemplation is described by Vasubandhu as follows:

One contemplates with Wisdom, correctly thinking about and visualizing that Land and Buddha, for one wishes to practice vipaśyanā (clear insight) in accordance with reality. There are three types of contemplation. What are the three types ? The first is to contemplate the virtues of the adornments of that Buddha Land (buddhakṣetra). The second is to contemplate the virtues of the adornments of Amitābha Buddha. The third is to contemplate the virtuous adornments of all of the Bodhisattvas in that Land.

Vasubandhu then goes on to describe the various adornments and details of the Pure land which can be visualized in meditation.

=== East Asian Mahayana ===
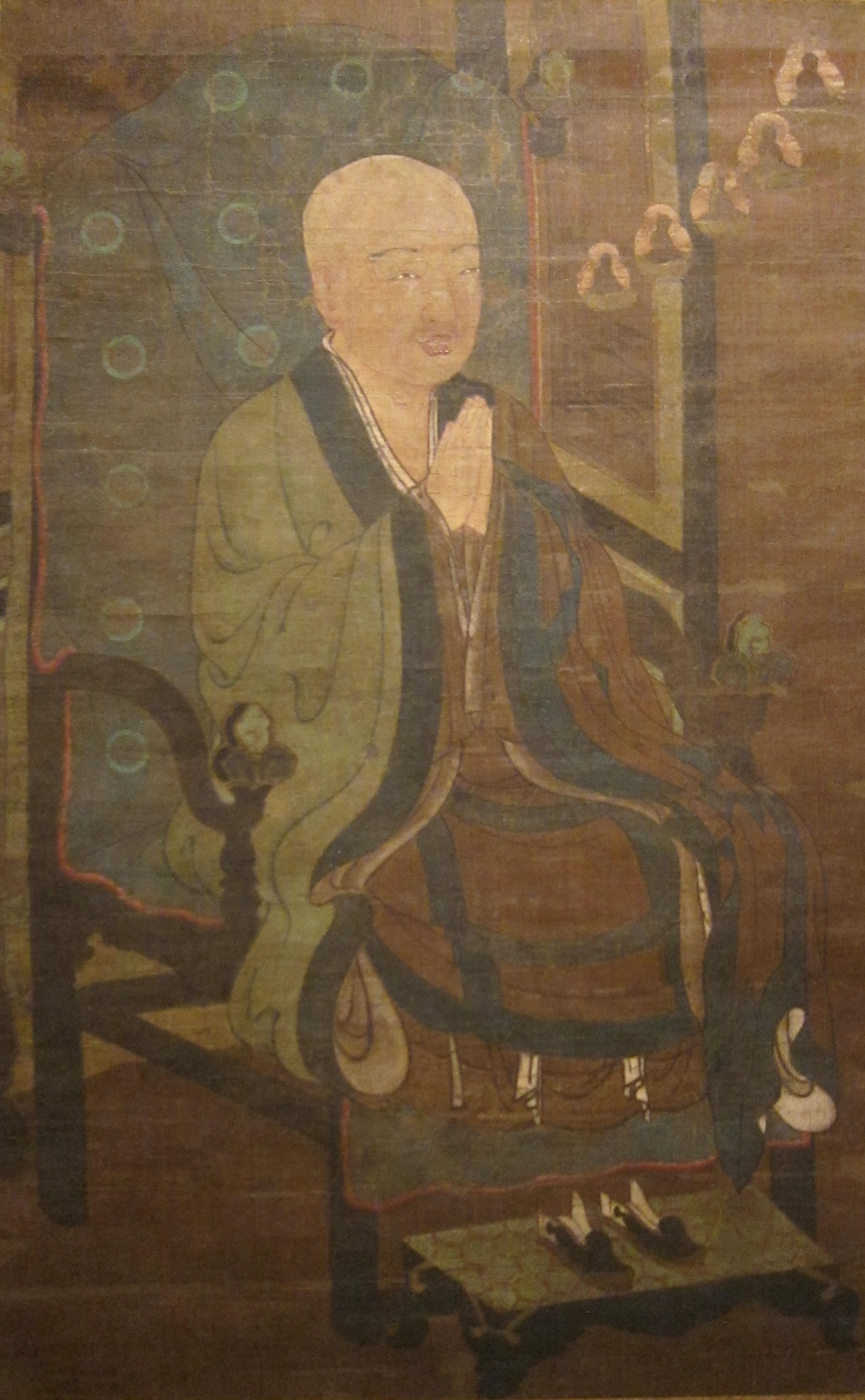
Portrait of the Chinese Pure land patriarch Shandao reciting nianfo

In East Asian Buddhism, buddhānusmṛti practice is called Nianfo (Japanese: Nembutsu) and it is the central practice of the East Asian Mahayana schools of Pure Land Buddhism. Following the lead of the 7th century Chinese Pure Land patriarch Shandao, the East Asian Pure Land schools tend to emphasize the oral recitation of the name of Amitabha Buddha over the visualization aspects of Buddhānusmṛti.

Due to the influence of Shandao's writings, which highlight vocal Buddhānusmṛti as the most important practice, the mere verbal chanting or recitation of the phrase 南無阿彌陀佛 (Mandarin: Nāmó Ēmítuófó, Japanese: Namu Amida Butsu, "Homage to Amitabha Buddha") without any visualization or other meditative technique, is the most widely practice form of Buddhānusmṛti in most East Asian Pure land traditions, including the Japanese Pure land traditions of Honen and Shinran. This recitation of the nianfo can be done individually or in group chanting sessions at temples or "nianfo halls"

Nevertheless, visualization practices is still be performed by certain East Asian Buddhist cultivators. Thirteen visualization meditations are taught in the Amitayus Contemplation Sutra and these have been important in the various Pure Land traditions. They include visualization of various elements of Sukhavati pure land, like the setting sun, the waters, ground and trees of the pure land, as well as the lotus throne of the Buddha, the Buddha Amitabha himself as well as his attendant bodhisattvas: Avalokiteśvara and Mahasthamaprapta.

Another type of Mahayana Buddhānusmṛti practice involves the recitation of a Buddha's mantra or a dharani of a specific Buddha, like the Pure Land Rebirth Dharani.

=== Vajrayana ===
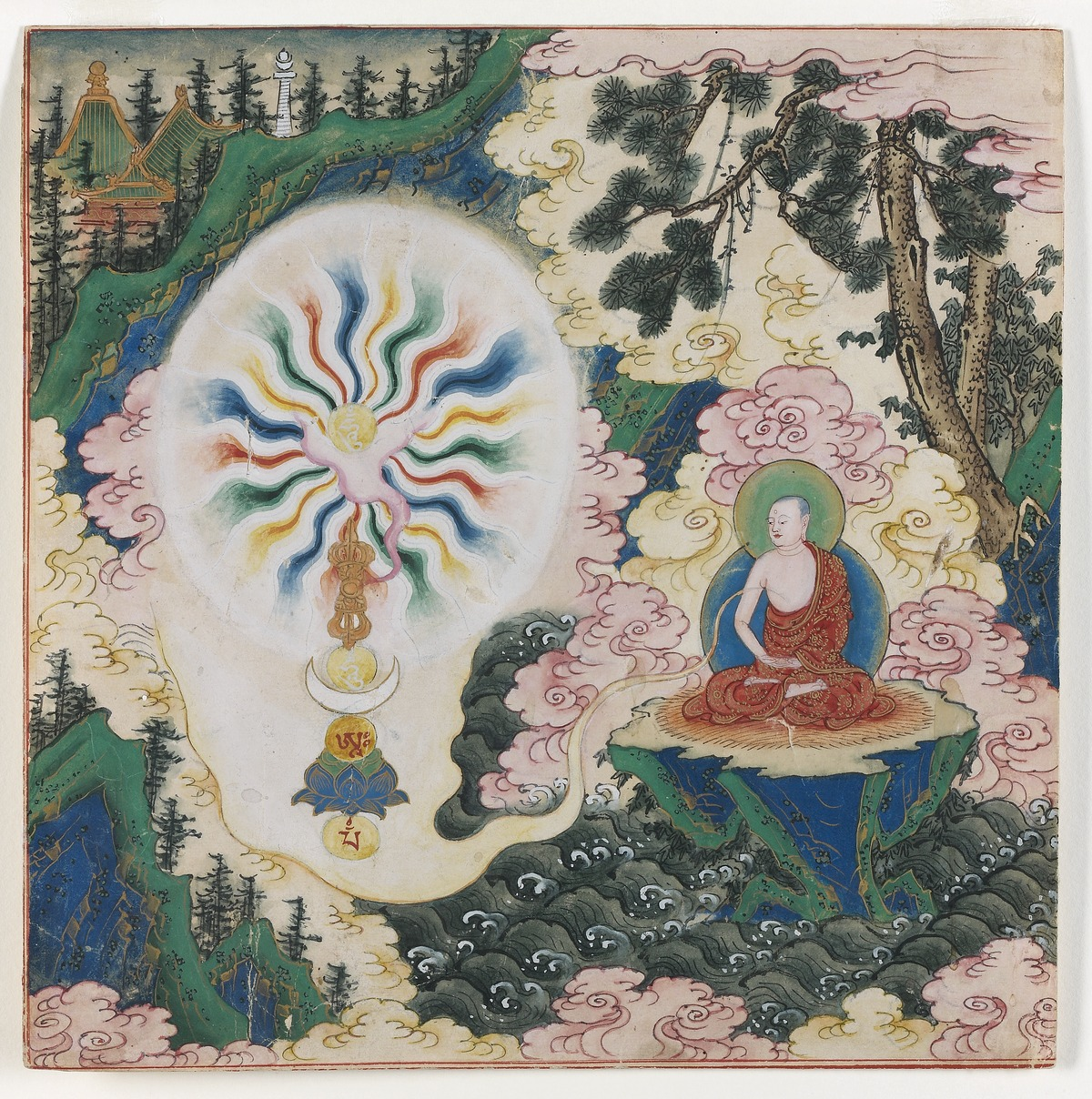
An 18th-century Mongolian miniature which depicts a monk generating a tantric visualization

In Vajrayana Buddhism, a tantric type of Buddhānusmṛti is developed in a practice called deity yoga (Tibetan: lha'i rnal 'byor; Sanskrit: Devata-yoga). The Vajrayana practice of Deity Yoga involves the use of a mandala image, mantra recitation and the visualization of a chosen meditation deity (Skt: iṣṭadevatā, Tibetan: Yidam), usually a Buddha or bodhisattva.

There are various types of deity yoga. One of the involves the meditator visualizing the deity in front of them and another involves the meditator visualizing themselves as their chosen deity and their surroundings with the elements of their mandala. Furthermore, one can visualize the deity in symbolic form as well. Common symbols include seed syllables, a vajra, or a moon disk. According to Shangpa Rinpoche, deity yoga is the most common type of meditation in Vajrayana Buddhism.

== See also ==
- Anussati
- Nianfo
- Buddha contemplation
- Deity yoga
- Ānāpānasati
- Ānāpānasati Sutta
- Kāyagatāsati Sutta
- Buddhist meditation
- Samatha & Vipassanā
- Buddhist chant
- Bhakti
- Prostration
