= Buddha contemplation =

Buddhist meditation practice

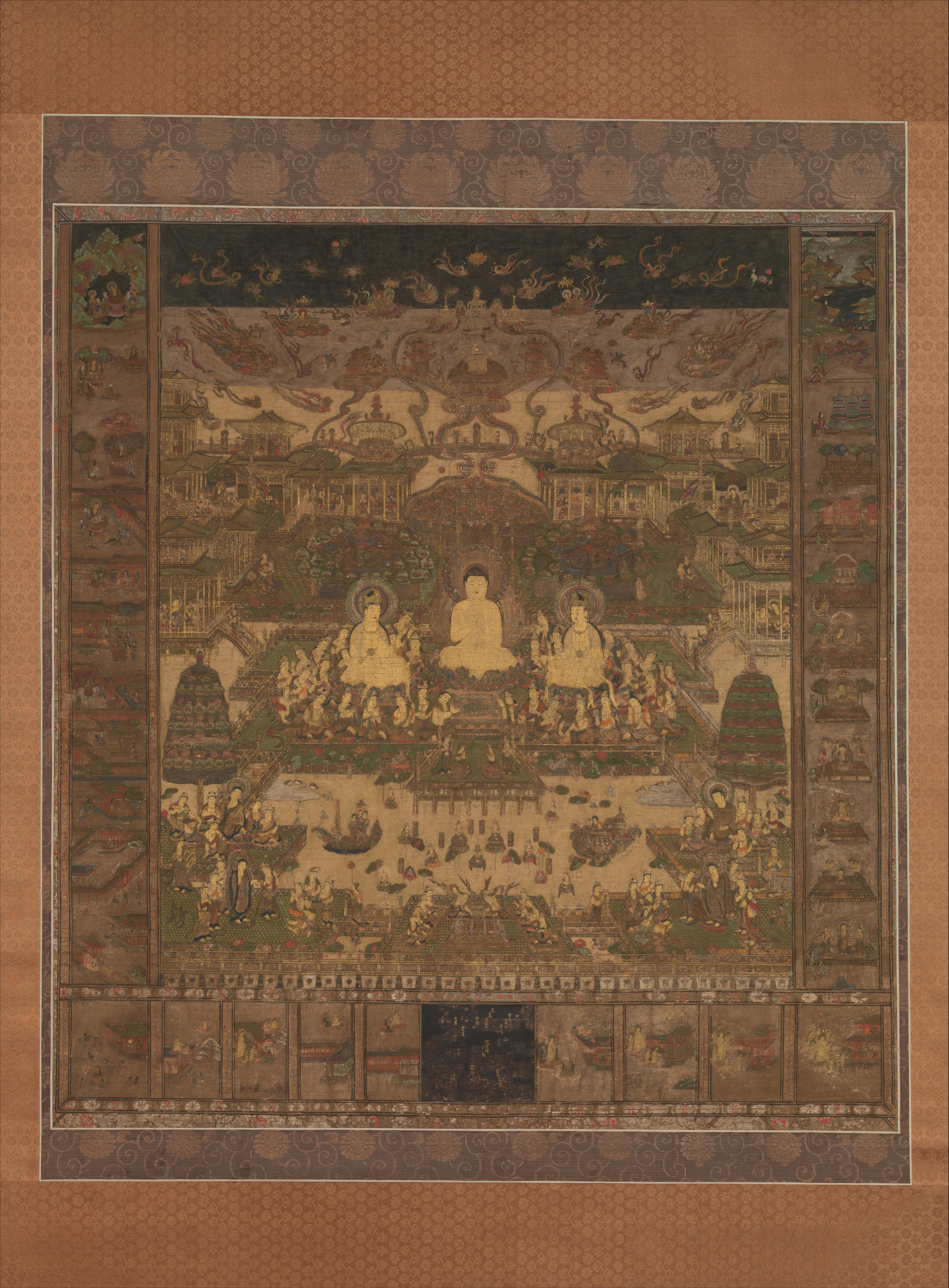
A Japanese scroll of the Taima Mandala (c. 14th century) depicting the scenery of the Sutra of the Contemplation of Amitayus

Buddha contemplation (Chinese: guānfo 觀佛), also known as Contemplative nenbutsu (Japanese: kan nenbutsu, 観念仏) is a central Buddhist meditation practice in East Asian Buddhism, especially popular in Pure Land Buddhism, but also found in other traditions such as East Asian Yogācāra, Tiantai and Huayan. This practice involves the visualization and contemplation of a mental image of a Buddha and the attributes of their Pure Land, aiming to develop faith, devotion, and a deep connection to the Buddha's spiritual qualities. Buddha contemplation is a Mahayana type of "buddha mindfulness" (buddhānusmṛti) meditation which focuses on imagination or visualization. The most popular Buddha used in this practice is Amitābha, but other figures are also used, like Guanyin, Maitreya, Cundi, and Samantabhadra.

In the Pure Land Buddhist tradition, this type of contemplation (also termed "contemplating the visualization", C: guānxiǎng niàn 觀想念) is often contrasted with another popular form of nenbutsu practice called "contemplation of the name [of the Buddha]" (C: chēngmíng niàn, 稱名念), especially the audible "vocal nenbutsu" (J: shōmyō nenbutsu) or "recitation of the name" (C: míngchí 明持), which refers to the practice of reciting nenbutsu.

The practice of Buddha contemplation is taught in various Mahayana sutras called Contemplation Sutras (Chinese: 觀經, Guān jīng, sometimes also translated as Visualization Sutras), which teaches contemplative practices based on fantastic visual images of Buddhas, bodhisattvas and their buddhafields. These works mostly survive in Chinese translations dating from about the sixth century CE. In Pure Land Buddhism, one of the most important sutras is the Amitāyus Contemplation Sūtra.

== Overview ==
Buddha contemplation is a kind of buddhānusmṛti (Buddha recollection, remembering the Buddha), a classic Buddhist meditation taught in numerous Early Buddhist sources which focused on contemplating the qualities of the Buddha, including the physical qualities of his body.

One of the earliest Mahayana sutras which describes something like the practice of Buddha contemplation (or at least visions of Buddhas) is the Pratyutpanna Samādhi Sūtra, whose full title is Pratyutpannabuddha Saṃmukhāvasthita Samādhi Sūtra ("Sūtra on the Samādhi for Encountering Face-to-Face the Buddhas of the Present"). In this sutra, the Buddha states that one may go to a secluded spot, sit down and concentrate one's thoughts on the Buddha Amitayus, then:

If they concentrate their thoughts with undistracted minds on the Tathagata Amitayus for seven days and nights, then, when a full seven days and nights have elapsed, they see the Lord and Tathagata Amitayus. Should they not see the Lord during the daytime, then the Lord and Tathagata Amitayus will show his face to them in a dream while they are sleeping.

In Pure Land Buddhism, guānfo is primarily associated with the meditation on Amitābha Buddha and his Western Pure Land, Sukhāvatī, a realm of bliss and enlightenment. Practitioners visualize Amitābha surrounded by serene landscapes and the Pure Land's inhabitants, such as bodhisattvas and celestial beings. They may also practice any of the sixteen contemplations or visualizations taught in the Contemplation Sūtra of Amitāyus, which includes visualization of the sun, of the ponds and trees of the Pure land and of the bodhisattvas Guanyin and Dàshìzhì. In the Amitāyus Contemplation Sutra, Queen Vaidehi asks the Buddha to teach her how to be reborn in the Pure Land of Sukhavati, and the Buddha states that she must “fix your thoughts and clearly contemplate that [buddha] land" and that through this practice, and "the power of the Buddha", "you will be able to see that Pure Land as clearly as if looking at your own image in a bright mirror. Seeing the utmost beauty and bliss of that land, you will rejoice and immediately attain insight into the non-arising of all dharmas." In explaining how this practice is effective, the Contemplation sutra states:

Because each Buddha Tathagata, as the body of the dharma-realm, pervades the mind of all sentient beings. Therefore, when you perceive a Buddha in your mind, it is your mind that possesses the thirty-two prominent features and the eighty secondary attributes; your mind becomes a Buddha; your mind is a Buddha; and the wisdom of the Buddhas — true, universal, and ocean-like — arises from this mind. Therefore, you should single-mindedly fix your thoughts and clearly perceive the Buddha....

The Contemplation sutra and its teaching on Buddha contemplation was very influential on East Asian Buddhism, especially the Pure Land school and there are over forty commentaries composed on it from the Sui to the Song dynasty alone. In Pure Land Buddhism, the visualization meditations are often accompanied by recitation of the Buddha’s name (nianfo in Chinese). It is believed that through such practices, the Buddha's power will purify the minds of practitioners, and that they will attain birth in the pure land. The practice of Buddha Contemplation is taught in several other texts which (together with the Amitāyus Contemplation Sutra) are known as Contemplation Sutras (觀經, Guān jīng). A main feature of these Contemplation Sutras is their teaching of contemplative practices using vivid visual imagery associated with Buddhas and other Buddhist deities. However, according to David Quinter, the contemplations taught in these sutras:

embrace more than visual phenomena, including auditory and didactic elements. Some passages do appear to urge the kind of precise visual replication of phenomena in the mind’s eye that is typically understood by “eidetic contemplation,” and which is integral to many uses of “visualization” in English. But other passages...point more toward any resulting vision as confirmation of the success of one’s practice, and these visions do not always mirror the phenomena described.

There is no consensus on a Sanskrit basis for the term "guan" (觀, which can mean contemplation or visualization). It could have referred to buddhānusmṛti (buddha recollection) or to dhyāna (meditation). According to some modern scholars, various Central Asian and Chinese Buddhist cave sites also include artistic works which are related to these contemplative images. In some of the Contemplation Sutras, like the Samadhi Sea sutra, the use of Buddha images or statues for devotion and meditation is specifically taught. The Contemplation Sutras also often discuss and teach the "recollection" or "oral recitation" (Chinese: nian 念) of the Buddhas and bodhisattvas, indicating that the practice of "contemplation" (guan) was more than just simple visualization. As Luis Goméz writes in his study of the Pure Land sutras, the term "guan" is not just visualization but:

[a] dedicated and constant repetition of verbal imagery— a sort of narrative rehearsal (anusmṛti?). This practice overlaps with certain forms of meditation but also overlaps with other rituals of remembrance and devotion. In practice, the Meditation and the Shorter Sutras often provide the content for chanting and recitation, rather than for silent meditations. The ritual and devotional context in which one finds these sutras fits somewhere between reciting or rehearsing a narrative, chanting a litany, imagining a narrative setting, and meditating.

Similarly, according to scholars like Nobuyoshi Yamabe and Cuong Mai, the practice of contemplation (guan) was closely connected with the practice of recitation or chanting (either of a ritual formula, a sutra or a Buddha's name) in Central Asian Buddhism and in early Chinese Buddhism.

Furthermore, the various Contemplation sutras also discuss how the practice of contemplation (guan) is effective at repenting for, purifying and extinguishing the effect of bad actions (i.e. evil karma) done in past lives.

Buddha contemplation is similar to and historically precedes the Vajrayana practice of Deity yoga. Some scholars like Robert Sharf see Buddha contemplation sources as being precursors to deity yoga. Sharf writes that the Contemplation Sutras contain meditations that include recitation, the use of icons, visualization , "and other elements often associated with Tantra". However, unlike the tantric deity yoga, Buddha contemplation does not require esoteric initiation (abhiseka), or make use of esoteric mudras or mandalas.

== Sources ==
=== The Contemplation Sutras ===
There are various Mahayana sutras associated with the term guan, though generally six major texts as seen as the central "Contemplation sutras" (Chinese: 觀經, Guān jīng) as listed by Alexander Coburn Soper (1959).

While the Chinese Buddhist canonical tradition claims these sutras are translations from Indian texts, no Indic originals have been found. Scholars disagree on their origin, positing Indian, Central Asian, or Chinese origins for specific sutras. While many scholars argue they were composed in China, even then, they accept the influence of Indic and Central Asian meditation traditions.

The main Contemplation Sutras are:

1. Sutra on the Sea of Samādhi Attained through Buddha Contemplation (Guan Fo Sanmei Hai Jing, 觀佛三昧海經, T.643), commonly known as Samādhi Sea Sutra. According to Yamabe, this is the oldest of the bunch. This was translated by Buddhabhadra (359-429 CE) .
2. Sutra on the Contemplation of Immeasurable Life (Guan Wuliangshoufo Jing, 佛说观无量寿佛经 T.365). Commonly known as the Contemplation Sutra, it was translated by Kālayaśas (fl. 424-442).
3. Sutra on the Contemplation of the Two Bodhisattvas Bhaiṣajyarāja and Bhaiṣajyasamudgata (Guan Yaowang Yaoshang Erpusa Jing), commonly known as Bhaiṣajyarāja Contemplation Sutra
4. Sutra on the Contemplation of Maitreya Bodhisattva's Ascent to Rebirth in Tusita Heaven (Guan Mile Pusa Shangsheng Doushuaitian Jing), commonly known as Maitreya Contemplation Sutra
5. Sutra on the Contemplation of the Cultivation Methods of the Bodhisattva Samantabhadra (Guan Puxian Pusa Xingfa Jing), commonly known as Samantabhadra Contemplation Sutra
6. Sutra on the Contemplation of the Bodhisattva Ākāśagarbha (Guan Xukongzang Pusa Jing), commonly known as Ākāśagarbha Contemplation Sutra.

Two other texts might also qualify as "Contemplation Sutras" or as being from a similar religious milieu. The first is the Mañjuśrī Parinirvāṇa Sutra (Wenshushili banniepan jing 文殊師利般涅槃經; T 463).

Another possible Contemplation type sutra is a part of the Avalokitasvara Invitation Sutra (Qing Guanyin jing 請觀音經; T 1043), particularly the chapter on Upasena. According to Greene, this section may be a part of the lost Avalokiteśvara Contemplation Sutra (Guanshiyin guan jing 觀 世音觀經) which appears as extant in Sengyou’s 517 catalogue but is listed as lost in later sutra catalogues.

=== Other related sources ===
Nobuyoshi Yamabe notes that the following texts also have a similarity to the visualization sutras, some of these are part of the so called "Meditation Sutra" category (Ch: chanjing):

1. A Manual on the Secret Essence of Meditation (Chan Miyaofa jing)
2. The Secret Essential Methods to Cure the Diseases Caused by Meditation (Zhi chanbing miyao fa)
3. The Essence of the Meditation Manual consisting of Five Gates (Wumen chanjing yaoyong fa)
4. The Yogalehrbuch (Yoga textbook), an anonymous meditation manual in Sanskrit found at Kizil Caves. Yamabe notes that the visualization practices here are similar to the Sea of Samadhi sutra.

Yamabe also cites various practice manuals found at Dunhuang, such as the Sūtra on the Major and Minor Bodily Marks (Xianghao jing 相好經), which is based on the Samādhi Sea Sutra.

=== Commentaries and Chinese sources ===
Various Chinese and Japanese commentaries and treatises discuss the practice of Buddha contemplation. One of the earliest sources is a letter by Kumārajīva to Lushan Huiyuan which is found in The great meaning of [the teachings of] the Dharma Master Kumārajīva (鳩摩羅什法師大義; Jiūmólóushí fǎshī dà yì, T.1856). In the letter, Huiyuan asks about the nature of the practice of the Pratyutpanna-samādhi-sūtra, and Kumarajiva outlines three types of nianfo samadhi:

There are three types of samadhi for seeing the buddhas (jiànfó sānmèi 見佛三昧): First, a bodhisattva might attain the divine eye or the divine ear, fly throughout the ten directions to where the buddhas reside, see them, ask questions about their difficulties, and have their snare of doubts severed. Second, even without spiritual powers, they can contemplate (niàn 念) Amitābha and all the buddhas of the present, and with their minds focused on this object, they can attain a vision of the buddhas and ask about their doubts. Third, they can study and practice nianfo whether or not they have abandoned their desires. Alternatively, they may gaze at a buddha image, or contemplate his earthly buddha-body, or see all of the buddhas of the past, present, and future. All three of these are called “nianfo samadhi.”

There are numerous commentaries on the Contemplation sutra which expand on the practice. These include Shandao's commentary and Jingying Huiyuan's commentary. The Tiantai (and the Japanese Tendai) traditions also maintained the practice throughout its history and many of their meditation treatises discuss the practice. Siming Zhili's Miaozongchao commentary to the Contemplation Sutra is one influential source on the Tiantai theory of Buddha contemplation.

In Japanese Buddhism, the work of Genshin (942–1017), especially his Ōjōyōshū (往生要集, Collection of the Essentials for Birth) is a key source for Buddha contemplation instructions.

This work became very influential on Japanese Pure Land Buddhism and Tendai Pure Land practice and numerous commentaries were written on it. One passage in a commentary attributed to the 12th century Pure Land founder Hōnen outlines the basic methods of contemplative Buddha recollection (kansō nenbutsu, 観想念仏) known in Japanese Buddhism at the time as follows:

There are three practices for visualizing Buddha. The first practice is individually observing each mark on Buddha’s body (bessōkan 別相観). The second practice is collectively observing all the marks on Buddha’s body (sōsōkan 総相観). The third practice is observing the white curl (ūrṇā) between his eyebrows and his radiant light (zōryakukan 雑略観). Furthermore, there are two acts within the first practice. First, there is observing the flower seat. Then, there is distinctly observing the marks on Buddha’s body. This means observing these marks from the top of his head to the bottom of his foot or in reverse order. This can be described in a broad sense or in a narrow sense. Moreover, there are two acts within the second practice. First, there is observing the marks on Buddha’s body and his radiant light through the Visualization of Immeasurable Life Sutra (Kan muryojyu kyō 観無量寿経). Then, there is observing three bodies (sanjin 三身) in a single essence through these marks. In addition, there are two acts within the third practice. First, there is observing the white curl between his eyebrows (byakugōkan 白毫観). Then, there is observing Birth in the Pure Land (ōjōkan 往生観). Additionally, there is extremely simple observation (gokuryakukan 極略観). It is simply observing the white curl between his eyebrows. As mentioned above, the sutras expound on these passages of visualization in detail.

== Description and application ==
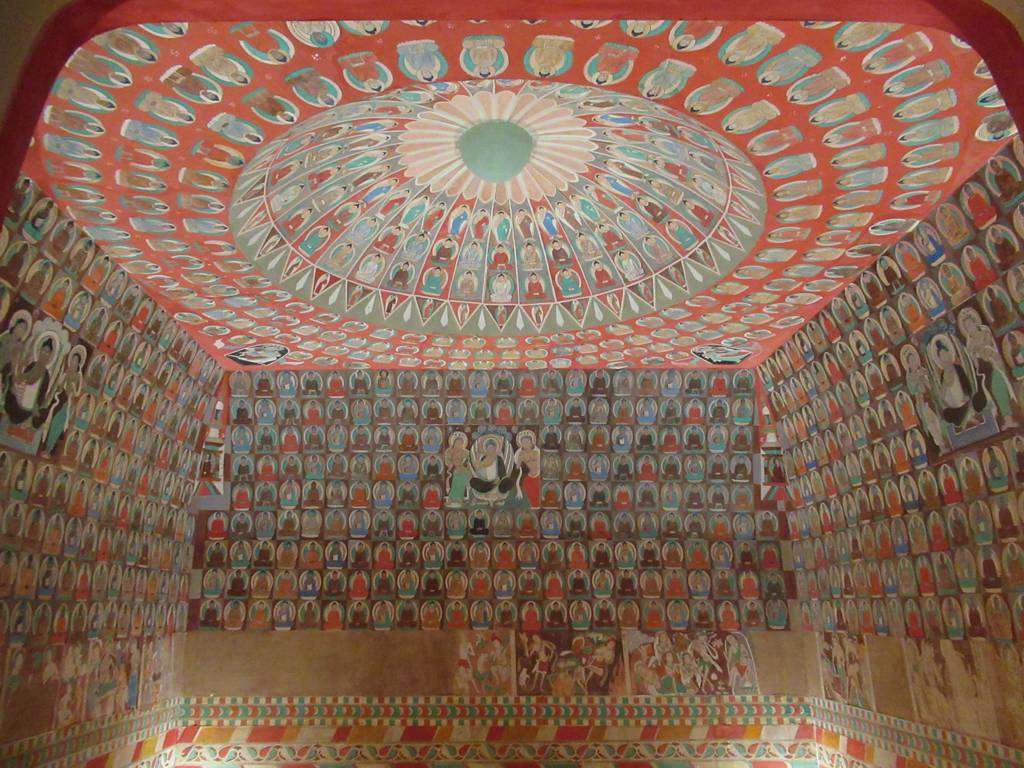
Depictions of buddhas at Cave 44 in Toyok Grottoes, Turpan. Modern scholars believe this kind of wall art was used to support visualization meditation by Buddhist monks.

Buddha contemplation is described in the Contemplation Sutras in different ways. For example, the Guan Fo Sanmei Hai Jing contains the following description of the practice:

There was a prince, Golden Banner by name, who was arrogant, holding wrong views, and did not believe in the True Dharma. A master monk, Mastery in Dhyāna by name, told the prince: “There are Buddhist statues decorated with various jewels and are extremely lovely. You should enter a stūpa and observe a statue of the Buddha.” Then the prince, according to the words of the good friend, enters the stūpa, observes the image and sees the major and minor bodily marks. Then [the prince] tells the monk: “Even a statue of the Buddha is so beautiful. How much more so the real body of the Buddha would be.” When he has said so, the monk tells him: “You have now seen the statue. If you cannot worship, you should chant, ‘Homage to the Buddha.’” Then the prince holds his hands in the āṇjali position and respectfully chants: “Homage to the Buddha.” Returning to the palace, with his mindfulness present, he calls the image in the stūpa to the mind (niānfo sanmei). Thus in the last watch of the night, in his dream, he sees the image/statue of the Buddha. Because he has seen the image/statue of the Buddha, his mind is greatly rejoiced . . . He always diligently practices with various Buddhas and attains profound samādhi of calling the Buddha to mind. Because of the power of this samādhi, Buddhas appear in front [of him] and gives him the prediction of the buddhahood.

The practice of contemplation or visualization of the Buddha is still performed in certain East Asian Buddhist traditions. Thich Minh Quang explains how this meditation is performed in the context of Vietnamese Buddhism. In Minh Quang's Vietnamese Buddhism in America the method as taught by Thích Thiên Ân is described as follows:

...One closes the eyes while sitting in proper posture, trying to bring into mind the image of a Buddha for visualization. Keeping that image and making it vivid in the mind’s eye while keeping out interference, one visualizes the image as if seeing a physical object with open eyes. One can open the eyes to look at the physical image of the Buddha in order to retain a clear image of the Buddha if needed and then close the eyes again, returning to inward visualization of the mental image. At the beginning, one sees the distinction between the object and the subject of meditation. However, as one is able to develop this mediation further, both the individual and the Buddha, as the subject and the object of meditation, disappear, leaving only oneness. That is the stage of “One Mind Samadhi” resulting from the calm mind during this particular inward contemplation and visualization.

In another passage he describes a contemplation method taught by another Vietnamese figure:

For individual practice of Buddha recitation, Đức Niệm recommends the recitation of Nam Mô A Di Đà Phật, the Vietnamese way for saying Namo Amitabha Buddha, broken down in single syllables, while visualizing that the in-and-out breath that appears like a vivid white silk ribbon. Breathing in, one recites “Nam Mô A,” and breathing out, one continues with “Di Đà Phật.” This is recitation performed by the mind rather than by the mouth (speech). From his experience, the regularity of in-and-out breathing coupled with one recitation prevents the practitioner from becoming exhausted from trying to do several recitations in a single breath. Also, it is a good way to avoid losing the counting. Furthermore, the visualization helps to keep the mind on focus, preventing the mind from drifting away by interferential thoughts. In order to enhance concentration if the previous method of recitation does not work, Đức Niệm proposes that one can also visualize the image of the Buddha until the mind is calm without disturbing thoughts.

=== In Tiantai / Tendai ===
In the Chinese Tiantai school and the Japanese Tendai school, the Buddha visualization practice is an important element of the Constantly Walking Samādhi (C: 常行三昧; chángxíng sānmèi, J: jōgyō zanmai), an intense practice that goes back to Tiantai Zhiyi. This practice entails mindful walking and meditating on Amitābha, while repeating the Buddha's name (nianfo). Traditionally it is also taught in a period of 90 days.

The jōgyō zanmai became a key practice of the Japanese Tendai school when it was brought to Japan by Ennin (794–864) who established a practice hall on Mt. Hiei. The practice is described by a modern Buddhist studies scholar as follows: "In this practice, the monk recites the Name of Amida Buddha while circumambulating an Amida statue with the intent of achieving a visualization of the buddha and therein realizing the nonduality of buddha and the practitioner. This practice is a monastic one and is typically considered to be contemplative".

== See also ==
- Dhyāna sutras
- Yogacara
- Buddhānusmṛti
- Nianfo
- Sarvastivada

== Sources ==
- Jones, Charles B. (2019). Chinese Pure Land Buddhism, Understanding a Tradition of Practice. University of Hawai'i Press / Honolulu.
- Mai, Cuong T. "Visualization apocrypha and the making of Buddhist deity cults in early medieval China: With special reference to the cults of Amitābha, Maitreya, and Samantabhadra." Phd diss, Indiana University, 2009.
- Ponampon, Phra Kiattisak. "Dunhuang Manuscript S.2585: a Textual and Interdisciplinary Study on Early Medieval Chinese Buddhist Meditative Techniques and Visionary Experiences." MPhil Diss., University of Cambridge, 2019.
- Soper, Alexander Coburn. Literary Evidence for Early Buddhist Art in China. Artibus Asiae Supplementum 19. Ascona, Switzerland: Artibus Asiae, 1959.
- Fujita Kōtatsu (藤田 宏達). “The Textual Origins of the Kuan Wu-Liang-Shou Ching: A Canonical Scripture of Pure Land Buddhism.” Translated by Kenneth K. Tanaka. In Chinese Buddhist Apocrypha. Edited by Robert E. Buswell Jr., 149–173. Honolulu: University of Hawai‘i Press, 1990.
- Yamabe, Nobuyoshi (1999a). “The Sūtra on the Ocean-Like Samādhi of the Visualization of the Buddha: The Interfusion of the Chinese and Indian Cultures in Central Asia as Reflected in a Fifth Century Apocryphal Sūtra.” PhD diss., Yale University.
- Yamabe, Nobuyoshi (1999b). The significance of the "Yogalehrbuch" for the Investigation into the Origin of Chinese Meditation Texts, Buddhist Culture, The institute of Buddhist Culture, Kyushu Ryukoku Junior College.
