= Pratyutpanna Samādhi Sūtra =

Mahayana Buddhist scripture (1st c. BCE – 2nd c. CE)

The Pratyutpanna Samādhi Sūtra (Sanskrit; traditional Chinese: 般舟三昧經; ; pinyin: Bozhōu Sānmèi Jīng; Vietnamese: Kinh Bát Chu Tam Muội) is an early Mahayana Buddhist scripture, which probably originated between the 1st century BCE and 2nd century CE in the Gandhara area of northwestern India. The full title for this text is Pratyutpannabuddha Saṃmukhāvasthita Samādhi Sūtra, which translates to, "Sūtra on the Samādhi for Encountering Face-to-Face the Buddhas of the Present".

The Pratyutpanna is a particularly important Mahayana sutra in East Asian Pure Land Buddhism and Tiantai (Jp: Tendai) Buddhism, since it contains key teachings on Buddha contemplation and Buddha recollection (nianfo). It is the main source for the Tiantai school's "constantly walking samadhi" practice (taught in Zhiyi's Mohe Zhiguan), also known as the pratyutpanna-samādhi (the meditative absorption of direct encounter [of the Buddhas]). The sutra was commented on and relied upon by numerous Chinese Pure Land masters, like Huiyuan, Shandao (613–681), Cimin Huiri, and Fazhao.

== History ==
The Pratyutpanna Samādhi Sūtra was first translated into Chinese by the Kushan Buddhist monk Lokaksema in 179 CE, at the Han capital of Luoyang. This translation is, together with the Prajnaparamita Sutra, one of the earliest historically datable texts of the Mahayana tradition.

In 2018, the discovery of fragments of a birch bark manuscript in the Gāndhārī language and written in Kharoṣṭhī script was announced by scholars Paul Harrison, Timothy Lenz, and Richard Salomon, who wrote regarding the dating of the manuscript:

In conclusion, the fragments of the PraS (Pratyutpanna Samadhi Sutra) clearly date from the middle period of Gāndhārī/Kharoṣṭhī documents, but as usual a more specific date cannot be proposed with any significant accuracy. The fragments could date from the first or second centuries CE, or possibly even from the first century BCE, since Gāndhārī manuscripts with similar characteristics have been dated by radiocarbon tests to BCE dates.

The post-script of the same paper notes that as the article went to press, scholar Mark Allon brought to the authors' attention "another set of birch-bark fragments, possibly from the same scroll or set of scrolls, containing a large section of Chapter 9 of the PRaS", which the authors state will be included in a follow-up article in the future.

== Contents ==
The Pratyutpanna Samādhi Sūtra contains the first known mentions of the Buddha Amitābha and his Pure Land, said to be at the origin of Pure Land Buddhism in China:

Bodhisattvas hear about the Buddha Amitābha and call him to mind again and again in this land. Because of this calling to mind, they see the Buddha Amitābha. Having seen him they ask him what dharmas it takes to be born in the realm of the Buddha Amitābha. Then the Buddha Amitābha says to these bodhisattvas: "If you wish to come and be born in my realm, you must always call me to mind again and again, you must always keep this thought in mind without letting up, and thus you will succeed in coming to be born in my realm.

== Pratyutpanna samadhi ==
The full practice developed by Zhiyi is 90 days long. Lay practitioners often take a much shorter time. Any practice that exceeds one day requires a bystander called a dharma protector (護法) to look after the practitioner. The exercise includes constant walking or praying to Amitabha, sometimes accompanying or helped by the bystander. The practitioner should avoid sitting, laying, resting or sleeping during the period of practice. The bystander would warn the practitioner if he or she engages in prolonged resting. Very few Buddhists practice this. Shi Yinguang (印光) suggested that people should practice the much easier recitation of name of the Buddha nianfo instead. But some buddhists have said that they feel healthier after the practice. The sutra passage describing this samādhi also contains one of the earliest occurrences of the statement "this [group of] three worlds is mind only." According to Bayer (2025), sleep deprivation, which is common in various Indian nocturnal rituals, may have contributed to an altered perception of reality.

== See also ==
- The Larger Sutra of Immeasurable Life
- The Contemplation Sutra
- Buddhist texts

== Bibliography ==
- Harrison, Paul; McRae, John, trans. (1998). The Pratyutpanna Samādhi Sutra and the Śūraṅgama Samādhi Sutra, Berkeley, Calif.: Numata Center for Buddhist Translation and Research. ISBN 1-886439-06-0
- Harrison, PM (1979). The Pratyutpanna-buddha-sammukhavasthita-samadhi-sutra: an annotated English translation of the Tibetan version with several appendices, thesis, Australian National University
- Harrison, Paul (1978). Buddhanusmriti in the Pratyutpanna-Buddha-Sammukhavasthita-Samadhi-Sutra, Journal of Indian Philosophy 6 (1), 35–57 JSTOR 23440029 (subscription required)
- Harrison, Paul (1990). The Samādhi of Direct Encounter with the Buddhas of the Present: An Annotated English Translation of the Tibetan Version of the Pratyutpanna-Buddha-Saṃmukhāvasthita-Samādhi-Sūtra with Several Appendices Relating to the History of the Text, Studia Philologica Buddhica 5. Tokyo: The International Institute for Buddhist Studies
- Bayer, Achim (2025). On the Relation between 'Single-Minded Concentration' and 'The Three Worlds are Mind Only' in the Pratyutpanna-samādhi-sūtra (English abstract of Japanese Article). Journal of Indian and Buddhist Studies 73.3., p. 1356.
