= Amitāyus Contemplation Sūtra =

Pure land sutra in East Asian Mahāyāna Buddhism

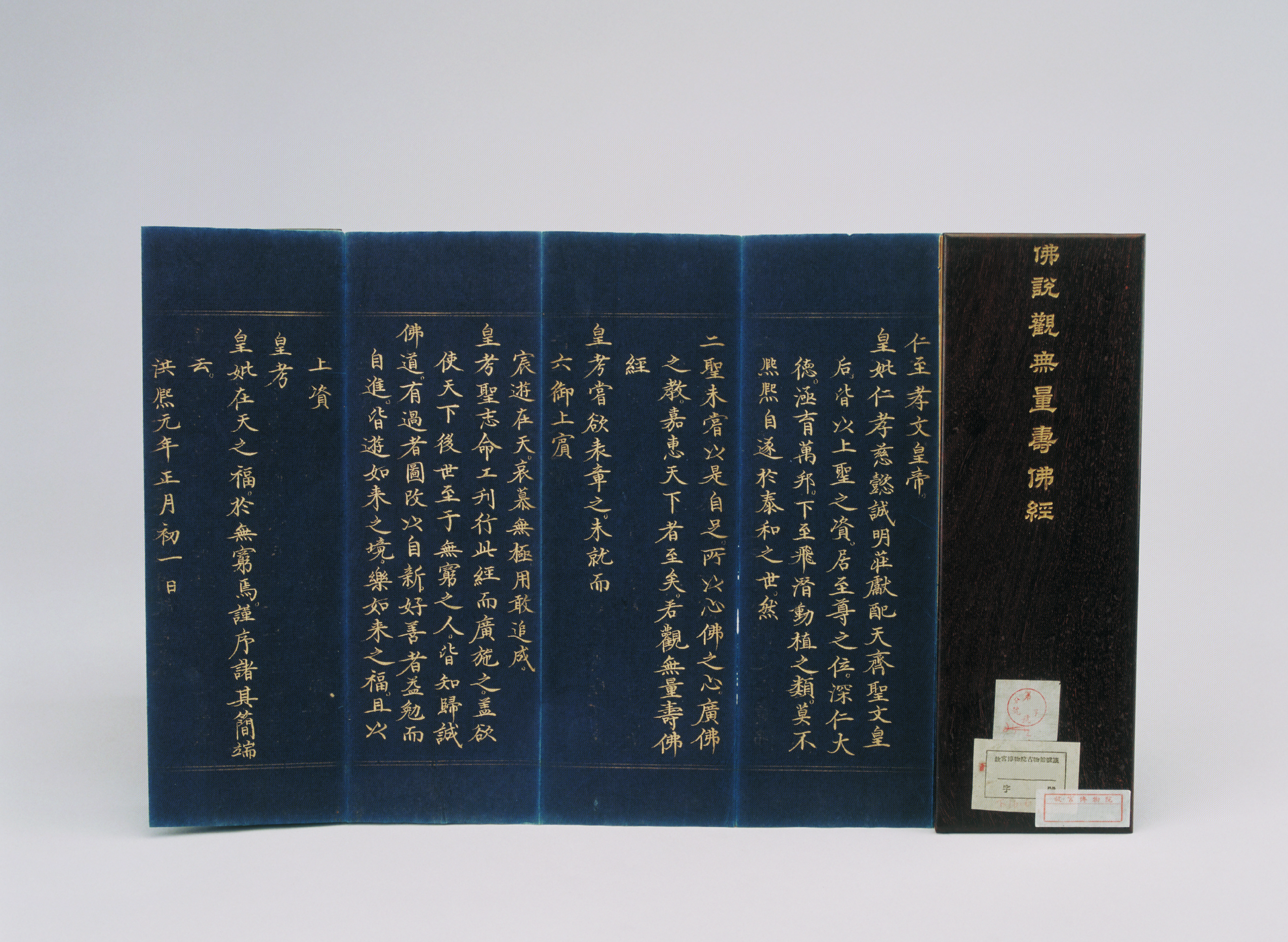
A part of a Qing dynasty copy of the Amitāyus Contemplation Sūtra

The Amitāyus Contemplation Sūtra (simplified Chinese: 佛说观无量寿佛经; traditional Chinese: 佛說觀無量壽佛經; pinyin: Fóshuōguānwúliàngshòufójīng, English: Contemplation of Amitāyus Sutra, or Sutra on the Visualization of Measureless Life [Buddha], Taisho no. 365) is a Mahāyāna sutra which is important for East Asian Pure Land Buddhism, a major branch of East Asian Mahāyāna. No Sanskrit original has been found, and the title of the sutra has been back-translated into Sanskrit by scholars as either Amitāyur-dhyāna Sūtra or Amitāyur-buddhānusmṛti-sūtra ("Amitāyus Buddha-mindfulness Sūtra"). The Contemplation Sūtra is part of a genre of Contemplation Sutras (Chinese: 觀經, Guān jīng) that include other similar texts with visual meditations like Samantabhadra Meditation Sutra.

Also called by the short title Contemplation Sutra (觀經, Guān jīng), this sutra is one of the three principle Pure Land sutras along with the Amitayus Sutra and the Amitabha Sutra. Amitāyus ("Measureless Life") is another name for the Buddha Amitābha, the preeminent figure in Pure Land Buddhism, and this sūtra focuses mainly on meditations involving visualizations of Amitabha and his pure land of Sukhavati (The Blissful). This is reflected in the name of the sūtra, which can be translated as "Amitāyus Contemplation Sūtra" or "Amitāyus Visualization Sutra" It is believed to have first been composed in Chinese in the 5th century.

== History ==
According to tradition, it was translated into Chinese by a monk named Kālayaśas 畺良耶舍 between 424 and 442 AD. However, it is generally considered by modern scholarship to be a non-Indian composition, possibly written in China or in Central Asia. Jonathan Silk has also shown that the frame narrative is based on a story which was known in India, so that at least this element of the sutra has an Indic basis.

No Sanskrit original has been discovered and the Sanskrit name and Sanskrit versions would thus be reverse translations. The text also shows Chinese influences, including references to earlier translations of Chinese Pure Land texts. Modern scholars generally accept that the text describes a meditation which was practiced in Central Asia, but with Chinese additions.

Other pieces of evidence point to a Central Asian origin for at least some of the content in the sutra. Mural paintings at Toyok, Turfan depict the contents of the sutra. Other such paintings, called Guanjing bianxiang 觀經變相, are found in Dunhuang.

The sutra became a very influential text in East Asian Pure Land Buddhism. It was taken up by Shandao 善導 (613–681), a key Pure Land author, who wrote an important commentary on the sutra called Commentary on the Sūtra of Contemplation of the Buddha of Infinite Life 觀無量壽佛經疏 (T 1753). Other commentaries were composed by Jingying Huiyuan (523–592) and Jizang (549–623). Another commentary (觀無量壽佛經疏 T 1750) is commonly attributed to Zhiyi, but this is likely a later composition.

== Outline of the Sutra ==
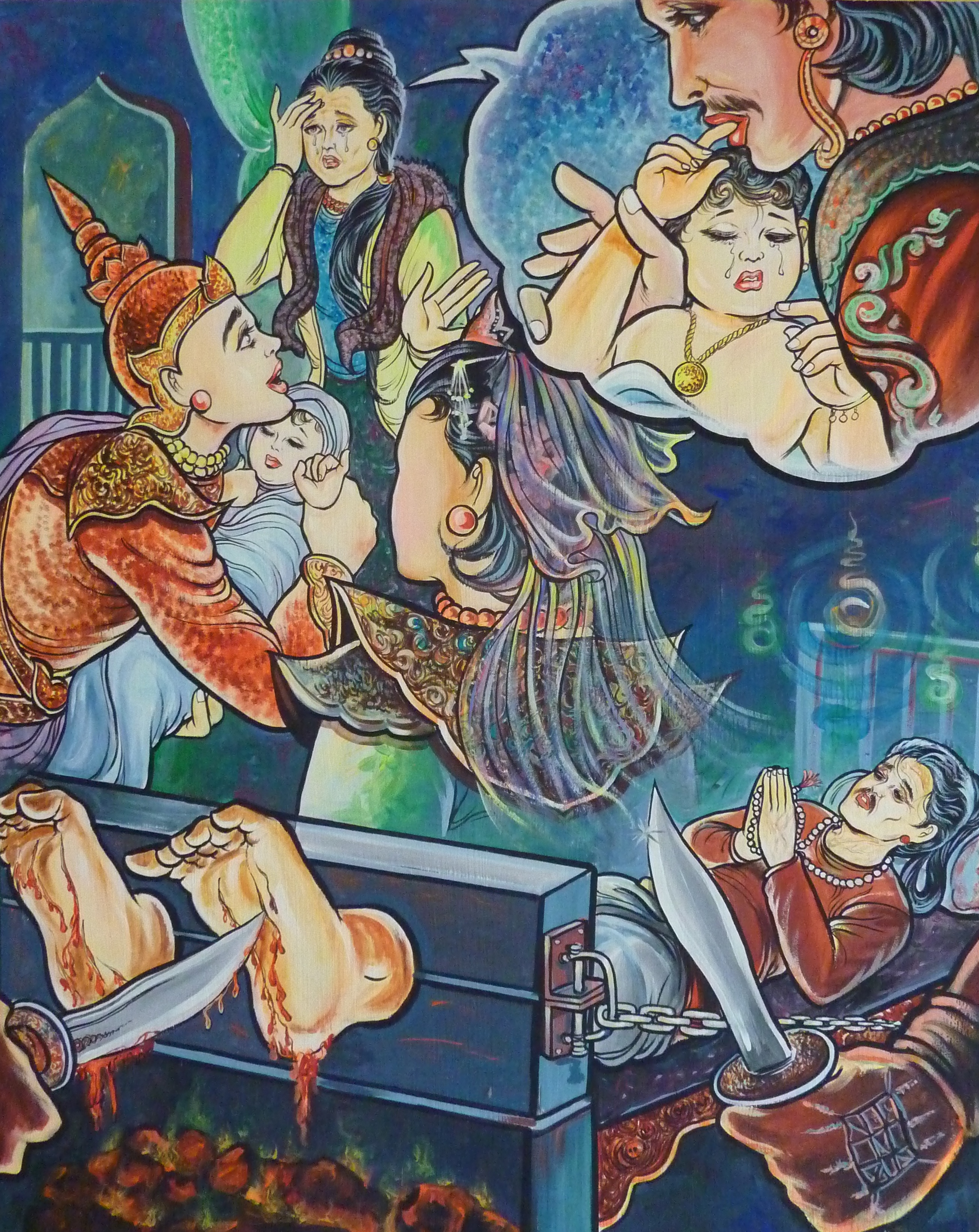
A Theravada depiction of the story of King Ajatasattu

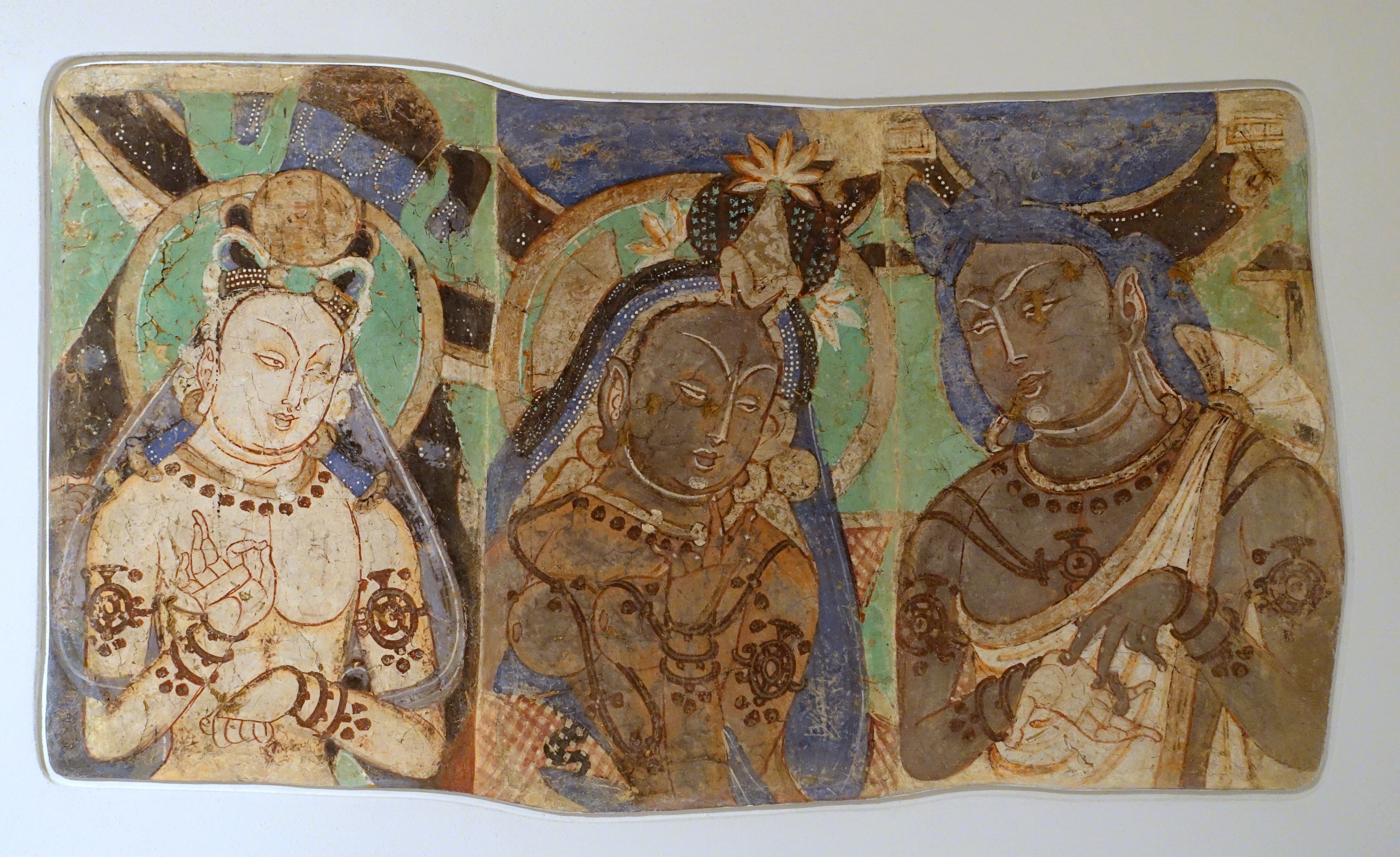
Wall painting of King Ajatashatru, his Queen, and his Minister Varshakara from the Kizil Caves (c. 251-403 AD).

=== Frame story ===
The text begins with a story where a prince named Ajātasattu was enticed by the villain Devadatta to murder his father, King Bimbisara, in order to ascend the throne. Ajātasattu kills his father, and nearly kills his mother, Queen Vaidehi, but after advice from his other ministers, he relented and threw his mother in prison.

Lamenting her fate, Queen Vaidehi prays to Gautama Buddha for help, and he is able to visit her. Vaidehi expresses her wish to be born in Amitābha's pure land. Shakyamuni smiles, emitting light from his mouth, and goes on to tell Vaidehi how to be reborn in the Pure Land. The Buddha tells her that although she is in prison, she could still obtain liberation through the practices of Amitābha. The Buddha goes on to describe Amitābha and how one could obtain rebirth in his land of Sukhavati.

This tale references historical incidents of the Haryanka dynasty of Magadha, India, and the religious tension between Gautama Buddha and his brother-in-law, Devadatta.

=== Three pure acts ===
A key practice that the Buddha recommends to Vaidehi as a way to attain birth in the pure land is the "three pure acts" (śuddhāni karmāṇi). The sutra explains these as follows:

Then the World-honored One said to Vaidehī, “Do you know that Amitāyus is not far away? Fix your thoughts upon and contemplate that buddha land. Then you will accomplish the pure acts. I shall describe it to you in detail with various illustrations, so that all ordinary people in the future who wish to practice pure karma may also be born in that Western Land of Utmost Bliss. Whoever wishes to be born there should practice the three acts: first, caring for one’s parents, attending to one’s teachers and elders, compassionately refraining from killing, and doing the ten good deeds; second, taking the Three Refuges, keeping the various precepts, and refraining from breaking the rules of conduct; and third, awakening aspiration for enlightenment (bodhicitta), believing deeply in the law of causality, chanting the Mahayana sutras, and encouraging people to follow their teachings. These three are called pure karma.”

=== Sixteen contemplations ===
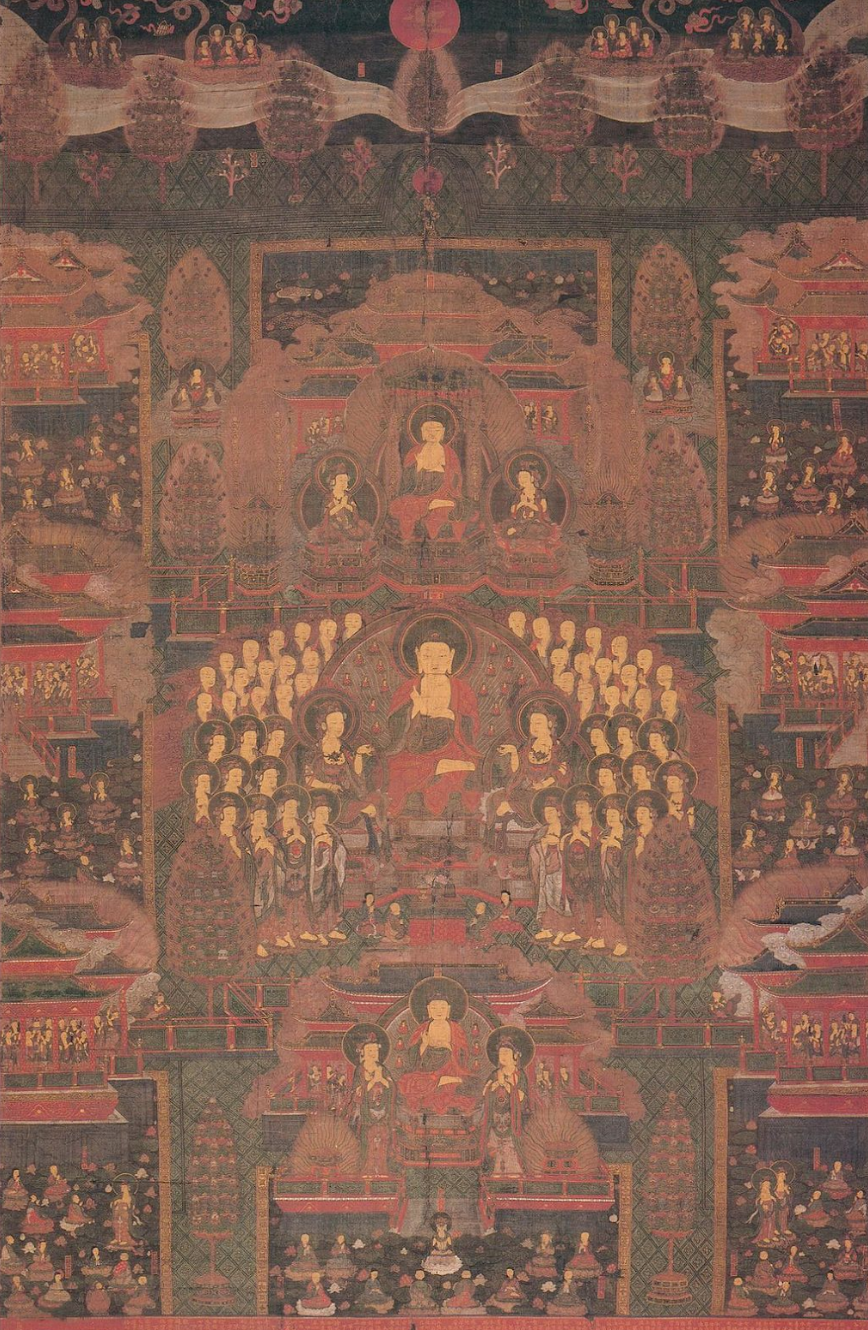
Korean scroll of the Visualization Sutra, 14th century.

Shakyamuni explains the importance of performing certain meritorious acts in order to be reborn in the Pure Land. He then goes on to teach Vaidehi how to contemplate the Pure Land, to further her efforts in attaining rebirth there. Shakyamuni describes sixteen "contemplations," or mental visualizations (Ch: guān, 觀). By deeply contemplating various aspects of the Pure Land and attempting to visualize them in detail, the aspirant draws closer to the Pure Land.

The sixteen contemplations are described in order as follows:

1. Contemplation of the setting sun
2. Contemplation of an expanse of water
3. Contemplation of the beryl ground
4. Contemplation of jeweled trees in the pure land
5. Contemplation of golden ponds in the pure land
6. Contemplation of various objects in the pure land
7. Contemplation of the lotus throne of the Buddha
8. Contemplation of the image of Amitābha Buddha
9. Contemplation of Amitābha himself
10. Contemplation of Avalokiteśvara bodhisattva
11. Contemplation of Mahasthamaprapta bodhisattva
12. Contemplation of the aspirants to the pure land
13. Contemplation of Amitābha and the two bodhisattvas
14. Contemplating the three highest grades of rebirth (in the pure land).
15. Contemplating the three middle "lotus grades".
16. Contemplating the three lowest grades.

=== Nine levels of birth ===
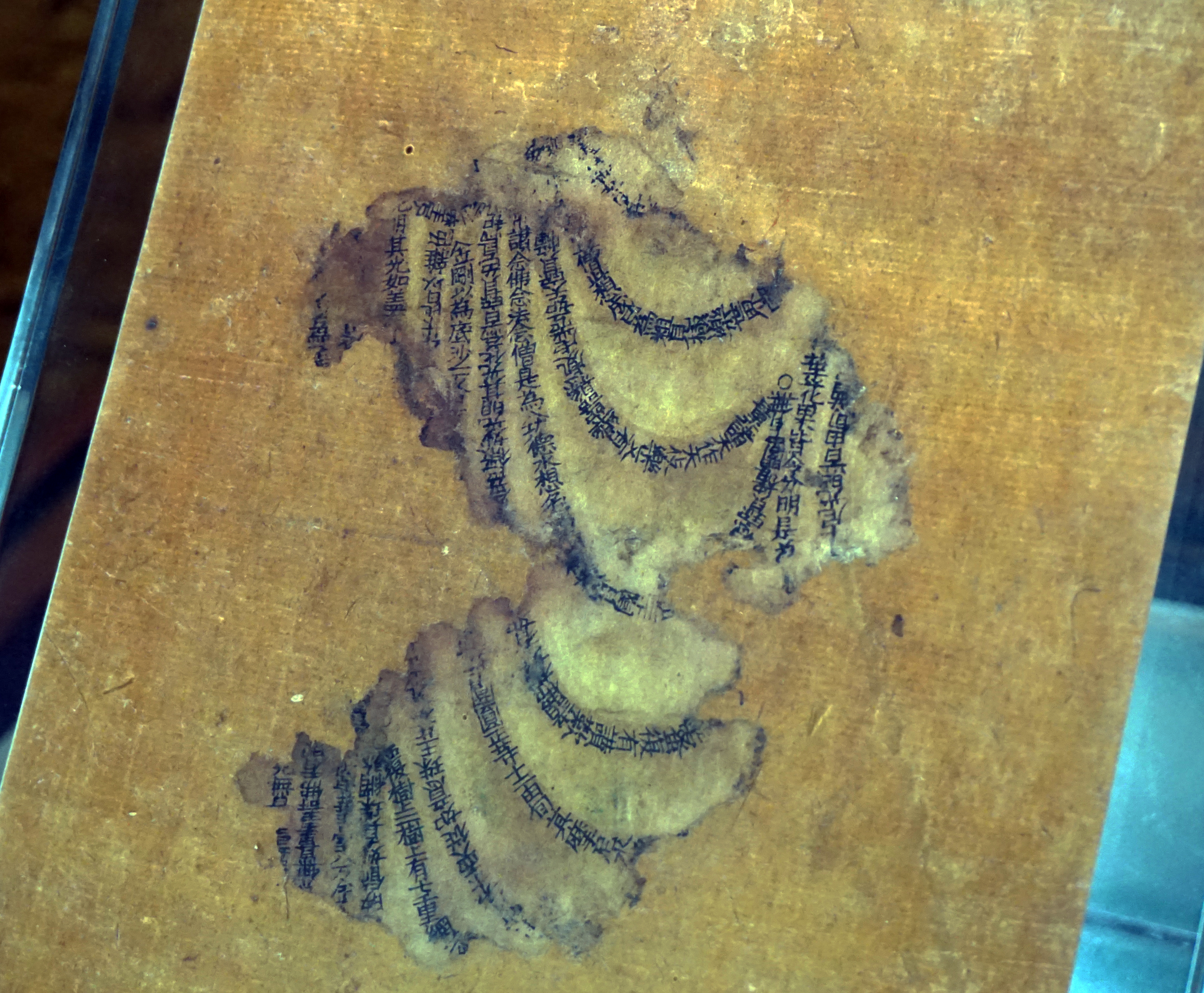
A fragment of a copy of the Amitayurdhyana Sutra at Wenzhou Museum.

In the final part of the Amitāyurdhyāna Sūtra, Gautama Buddha discusses the nine "lotus levels" into which those born into the pure land are categorized. The levels are ranked from highest to lowest as follows:

1. The highest level of the highest grade of rebirth: devoted followers of the Mahayana who have deep faith and engage in virtuous actions. Upon their death, they are welcomed by Amitābha and a multitude of sages. Once they are born in Sukhavati, they are immediately able to see Amitābha and hear his teachings, and immediately attain several high spiritual states.
2. The middle level of the highest grade: those who have faith in the law of karma and are able to understand the Mahayana teachings. Upon their death, they are welcomed by Amitābha and a multitude of sages. Seven days after their rebirth in the pure land, they gain the stage of non-retrogression.
3. The lower level of the highest grade: those who believe in the law of karma and develop bodhicitta. Upon their death, they are welcomed by Amitābha and a multitude of sages. They are enclosed in lotus buds for a single day, and after seven days they can see Amitābha and gradually gain enlightenment.
4. The highest level of the middle grade: those who observe the five precepts and other precepts. Upon their death, they are welcomed by Amitābha and a multitude of sages. Once their lotus buds open, they are able to hear the Dharma and attain arhatship.
5. The middle level of the middle grade: those who follow various Buddhist precepts, even for a single day. Upon their death, they are welcomed by Amitābha and a multitude of sages. Their lotus buds open after seven days, immediately becoming stream-enterers and attaining arhatship half a kalpa later.
6. The lower level of the middle grade: those who do good deeds in their current life, such as being dutiful to their parents. Upon their death, they are welcomed by Amitābha and a multitude of sages. Their lotus buds open after seven days, and attain arhatship after a small kalpa.
7. The highest level of the lower grade: those who commit various evil actions, but hear Mahayana sutras before they die and are instructed to recite the name of Amitābha. Upon their death, they are escorted by the transformed body of Amitābha and the transformed bodies of several bodhisattvas. They are confined in lotus buds for seven weeks, and when they are freed they hear the dharma from the two attendant bodhisattvas of Amitābha, Mahāsthāmaprāpta and Avalokiteśvara. After ten small kalpas, they attain the first bhūmi as bodhisattvas.
8. The middle level of the lower grade: those who commit various offenses against the Dharma and the sangha, and break various precepts. When they are about to die and be reborn in the hell realms, they hear about Amitābha from a virtuous teacher. After they are reborn in the pure land, they are confined in lotus buds for six kalpas, and once they are freed they can finally hear the Mahayana teachings.
9. The lower level of the lower grade: those who are true evildoers and commit the gravest offenses, which would inevitably let them be reborn in the lowest levels of hell. Before they die they meet a good teacher who encourages them to repeat the name of Amitābha. Once they have repeated his name ten times, their evil karma is extinguished, and they are able to see golden lotus pods at death. After twelve long kalpas, their lotus buds open, and they can finally hear the Mahayana teachings.

According to the Buddha, all nine grades of human beings can achieve rebirth into the Pure Land if they contemplate Amitābha or at least call on his name. This is similar to the 48 vows made by Amitābha, according to the Infinite Life Sutra, which includes the Primal Vow.

=== Conclusion ===
The sutra ends with a short section describing the benefits gained by those who listened to these words of the Buddha. Vaidehi experienced "great awakening with clarity of mind and reached the insight into the non-arising of all dharmas," while her five hundred female attendants and "innumerable devas" also awakened aspiration for the highest enlightenment. Shakyamuni names the sutra, mentions benefits connected with the name of Amitabha Buddha, and exhorts all to hold the words of the sutra in their minds. Shakyamuni then returns through the air to Vulture Peak.

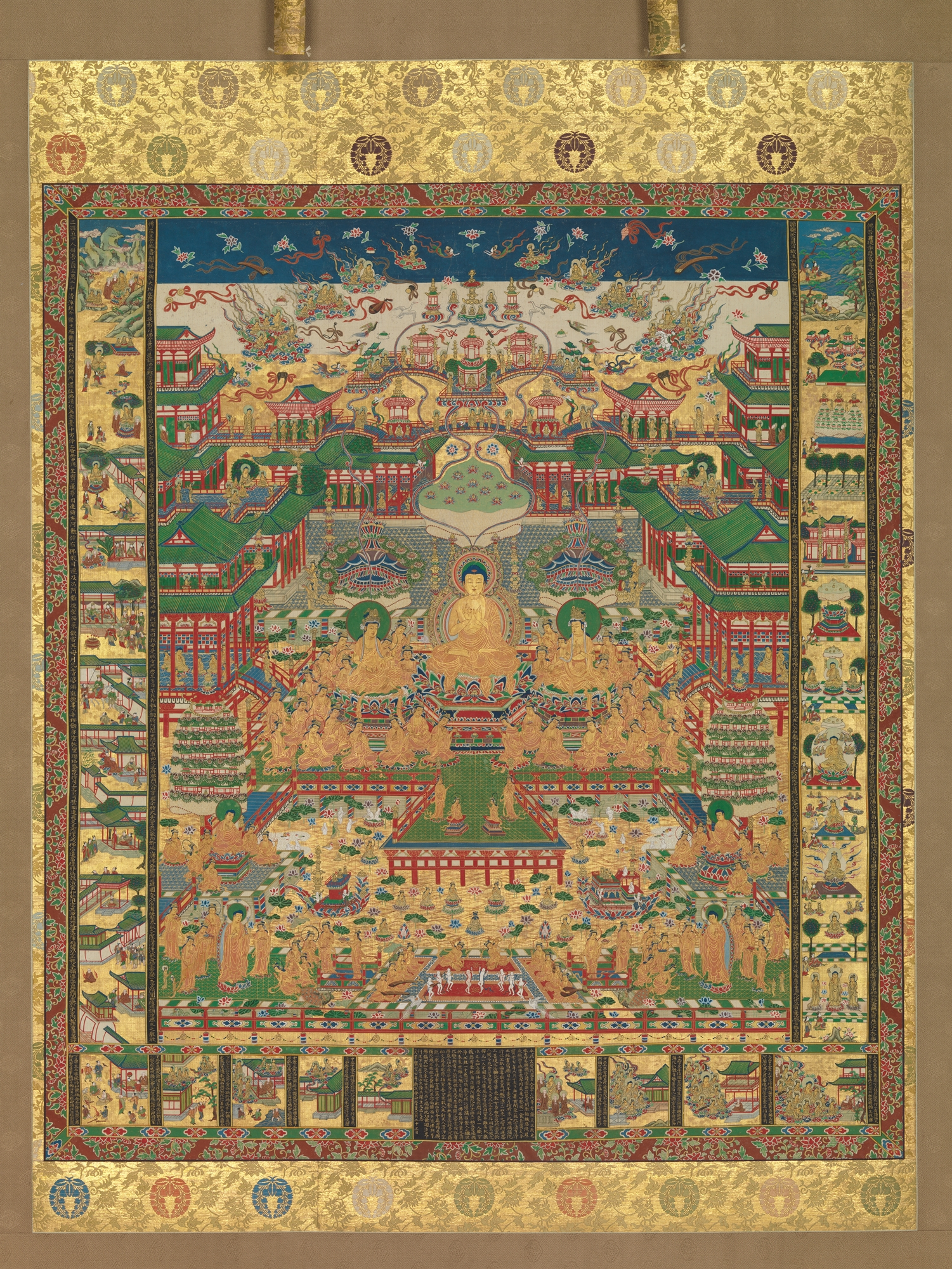
Japanese copy of the Pure Land Taima Mandala, which is based on the Amitāyus Contemplation Sūtra

== Artistic depictions ==
The Contemplation Sutra's visionary imagery inspired much Buddhist art in Central Asia and East Asia. Some of the earliest examples include the cave and mural paintings in various Buddhist cave complexes along the silk road. Cave 20 in the Toyok Grottoes in Turpan includes a mural from the late sixth century, which is believed by modern scholars to be one of the earliest illustrations of based on the Contemplation Sutra's thirteen visualizations. The cave paintings may have been made to assist monks in visualization meditations. Another early (pre-Tang) example is the Xiaonanhai Central Cave relief.

Later Buddhist art depicts images of the Contemplation Sutra in more portable form, such as in scrolls and other paintings. One of the most famous of these is the 8th century Japanese Taima Mandala, a widely copied and imitated depiction of the Pure Land based on the Contemplation Sutra. The original was made around 763 CE. It currently resides at Taima-dera temple in Nara.

== Commentaries ==
There are numerous Chinese commentaries to the Contemplation Sutra. The earliest extant commentary is that of Jingying Huiyuan (c. 523–592).

Tanaka lists the following extent commentaries:

- Kuan wu liang shou ching i shu, by Jingying Huiyuan (523-592) (T 1750.37)
- Kuan wu liang shou ching i shu, by Jizang (549-623) (T 1752.37)
- Kuan wu liang shou fo ching shu, by Shantao (613-681) (T 1753.37)
- Kuan wu liang shou ching shu, by Tao yin (contemporary of Shantao in Ch'ang an), fragmentary
- Fo shuo wu liang shou ching shu, traditionally attributed to Zhiyi but actually an apocryphal Tiantai school work compiled as late as the mid eighth century (T 1750.37)
- Kuan wu liang shou ching chi, by Lung hsing (655 711?), fragmentary
- Wu liang shou kuan ching tsan shu, author unknown
- Kuan wu liang shou fo ching chi, a Dunhuang manuscript from an unknown author (T 2760.85)
- Kuan wu liang shou fo ching chi, Fa ts'ung (ZZ 1.32.4) (compiled by 817)
- Kuan wu liang shou fo ching shu miao tsung ch'ao, Siming Zhili (960-1028) (T 1751.37)
- Kuan wu liang shou fo ching i shu, Yuanzhao (1048-1116) (T 1754.37)

=== Shandao's commentary ===
Shandao's (善導, 613–681) Commentary on the Amitāyus Contemplation Sūtra (Guan Wuliangshou Jing Shu 觀無量壽佛經疏, T 1753) was a particularly influential text, especially on Japanese Pure Land Buddhism. This commentary became canonical for the Japanese traditions that followed Hōnen, and is cited by almost all major Japanese Pure Land authors, some of whom wrote further sub-commentaries on Shandao's text. For Hōnen, Shandao's commentary is the main textual authority for Pure Land doctrine. According to his Senchakushū: "Shandao's Commentary on the Meditation Sutra is the guidebook to the Western Pure Land. It should be regarded as the eyes and feet of nembutsu devotees."

Hōnen himself wrote several works which cite and comment on the Contemplation Sūtra. Though he did not write a full commentary on the sutra alone, his Commentary on the Three Sutras of Pure Land Buddhism comments on the Contemplation Sutra alongside the other Pure Land sutras. Zen'ebo Shōkū (1177–1247), one of Hōnen's students, wrote three works on Shandao's commentary, including the encyclopedic Kangon Yōgishō (観門要義鈔, Annotated Essentials of the Gate of Contemplation) in 43 fascicles.

== See also ==
- Longer Sukhāvatīvyūha Sūtra (Infinite Life Sutra)
- Shorter Sukhāvatīvyūha Sūtra (Amitabha Sutra)
- Pure Land Buddhism
- Sukhavati
- Amitābha
- Jōdo-shū
- Jōdo Shinshū
- Sutra
- Chinese Buddhism

== Sources ==
=== Bibliography ===
- Muller, A. Charles (1998). "East Asian Apocryphal Scriptures: Their Origin and Role in the Development of Sinitic Buddhism". Bulletin of Toyo Gakuen University. 6: 63–76. Archived from the original on 2013-03-17.
- Silk, Jonathan A. (April 1997). "The Composition of the 'Guanwuliangshoufo-jing': Some Buddhist and Jaina Parallels to its Narrative Frame". Journal of Indian Philosophy. 25 (2): 181–256. doi:10.1023/A:1004291223455. JSTOR 23448579. S2CID 169187184.
