= Jingying Huiyuan =

Chinese Buddhist scholar-monk

Jingying Huiyuan (Chinese: 淨影慧遠, "Huiyuan of Jingying Temple", Japanese: Jōyō Eon; c. 523–592) was an eminent Chinese Buddhist scholar-monk of the Dilun branch of Chinese Yogācāra. He was a prolific commentator who wrote various commentaries on key Mahayana Sutras. He was the first Chinese author to write commentaries on the Pure Land Sutras (which still survive) and his commentary on the Contemplation Sutra influenced later Pure Land Buddhist figures like Daochuo and Shandao. Like later Pure Land figures, Huiyuan taught that even ordinary people could attain birth in the Pure Land through recitation of the Buddha Amitabha's name (nianfo).

Huiyuan's philosophy is a synthesis of Yogācāra and buddha-nature thought. He also advanced the doctrines of essence-function and the "dependent origination of the tathāgatagarbha" (Ch: 如來藏緣起, pinyin: rulaizang yuanqi), which holds that buddha-nature is the essence of both nirvāṇa and saṃsāra, both of which were seen as its "functions" (yong). Huiyuan synthesized this teaching with the Yogacara mind-only philosophy, identifying buddha-nature with the fundamental consciousness (ālāyavijñāna). Huiyuan's metaphysics was influential on later Huayan authors, like Fazang.

== Life ==
Huiyuan was born in Dunhuang (in modern-day Gansu) and became a monk in Guxiangusi monastery (Shanxi province) at an early age. At age twenty he received full ordination from the Dilun (Dasabhumikasutra school) master Fashang (495–580) and studied Vinaya under vinaya master Dayin (d.u.). Fashang in turn had been a student of the patriarch of the Southern Dilun sect, Huiguang (慧光). Huiyuan studied under Fashang for over seven years. Huiyuan's works mainly follow the thought of the previous Dilun masters, who syncretized the Yogacara philosophy of Vasubandhu and the buddha-nature thought of the Nirvana sutra. Huiyuan also later studied with a scholar of the Shelun tradition, Tanqian (曇遷, 542–607).

Huiyuan later resided at Qinghuasi monastery. During the reign of the Northern Zhou Emperor Wu (r. 560–578), there was a persecution of Buddhism in which many temples were seized and many monks forced into lay life or military service.

The emperor also ordered Buddhist elders to gather so he could inform them of his reasons for the persecution: Buddhist images violated the formlessless of the Buddha, the temples were wasteful and Buddhist monasticism was counter to filial piety. Huiyuan is said to have stood up and debated the emperor on these issues and a transcript of this debate has survived. Huiyuan then lived in seclusion for some three years during the rest of the persecution, focusing on reciting sutras and meditation.

After the rise of the Sui Dynasty (581–618), Huiyuan became the overseer of the saṃgha (shamendu) in Henan and worked to restore the Buddhist community. At the request of Emperor Wen (r. 581–604), Huiyuan eventually moved to the capital of Daxing where he resided at Daxingshansi monastery and later at Jingyingsi monastery, built by the emperor specifically for Huiyuan.

Jingying Huiyuan was prolific, writing numerous commentaries on key Mahayana texts, including commentaries on the Avataṃsakasūtra, Mahāparinirvānasūtra, Vimalakīrtinirdeśa, Sukhāvatīvyūhasūtra, Śrīmālādevīsiṃhanādasūtra, and on Vasubandhu's Daśabhūmika Commentary (Shidi jing lun). He also wrote the Compendium of the Purport of Mahāyāna (Dasheng yi zhang), an influential encyclopedia of Mahāyāna Buddhism.

== Thought ==
=== Metaphysics ===
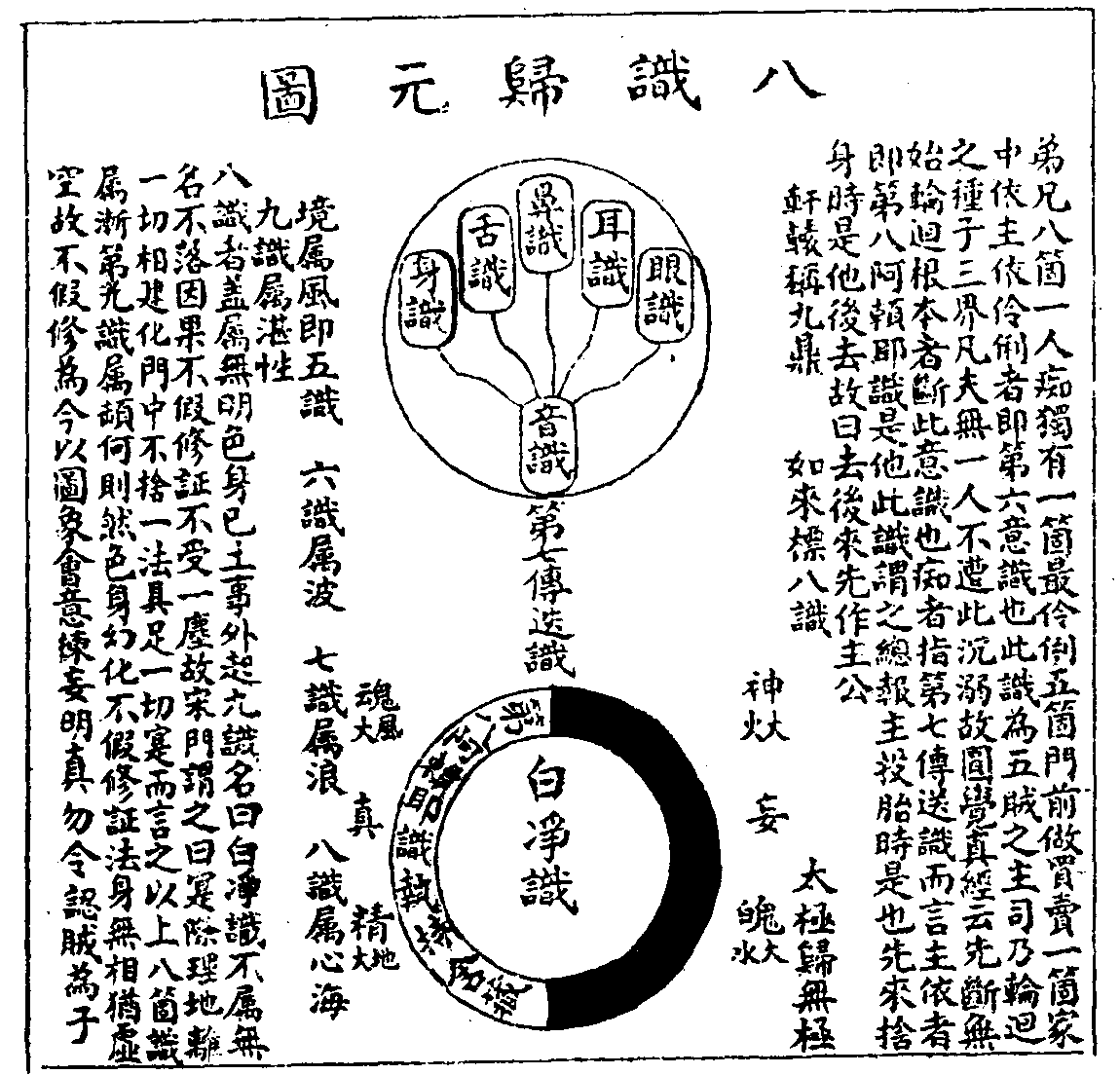
A diagram of the model of the Eight Consciousnesses similar to that taught by Huiyuan (from the Xingming guizhi). The bottom circle depicts the origin of all phenomena, the "pure and undefiled consciousness" (白淨識bái jìng shí) enclosed in a circle representing the alaya with dark (defiled) and white halves (virtuous consciousness). It is connected to the upper circle (which includes the sense consciousnesses) by the seventh consciousness.

Huiyuan's central philosophy was a combination of Yogacara mind-only thought, which holds that all phenomena arise from mind, and the buddha-nature teaching, which holds that all beings have Buddhahood within. Huiyuan owes much of this basic metaphysics to his teacher Fashang as well as to earlier Mahayana texts like the Laṅkāvatāra Sūtra and the Awakening of Faith (which according to Huiyuan, was written based on the Laṅkāvatāra). For Huiyuan, all reality (samsara and nirvana) dependently arises from a pure consciousness or "true mind", the buddha-nature, a doctrine he referred to as "tathāgatagarbha dependent arising" (rulaizang yuanqi), a term he coined. Huiyuan equates the buddha-nature with the Yogacara basis consciousness (ālāyavijñāna). In drawing this equivalence, he cites the Laṅkāvatāra Sūtra which outright states "tathāgatagarbha is called the ālāyavijñāna."

Huiyuan's teaching on buddha-nature also draws on essence-function (tiyong) theory and this was influential on later East Asian Buddhist tradition. For Huiyuan, all beings have the buddha-nature, which is an innate, pure, and real kind of awareness (juecha 覺察). It is the intrinsic reality (ti 體) which "constantly abides" (changzhu 常住; nitya) and yet also adjusts to conditions. Huiyuan also defines it as the primary cause or seed of Buddhahood and as the immutable true pure mind which can never be tainted. In spite of this, Huiyuan also affirms that the buddha-nature can appear or manifest in pure or impure ways. All of these appearances (of samsara and nirvana) are the "functions" (yong) of Buddha-nature, which is the immutable essence (ti) of all things. This also means that all sentient beings with definitely becomes Buddhas eventually.

As a Yogacarin, Huiyuan held that "all dharmas are produced by the one mind, just as events in dreams are created by the mind in slumber." According to Huiyuan, all phenomena (dharmas) arise from the mutual interplay of the mind of thusness (無爲法, also called the true consciousness—zhenshi 真識—which is unconditioned) and the mind of falsehood (有爲法, or the false consciousness, which is conditioned). The false mind gives rise to the illusory world of samsara. However, for Huiyuan, this false mind is provisional, since all things ultimately arise from the true mind, the buddha-nature. Huiyuan draws on the analogy of the rope mistaken as a snake in the darkness for this distinction. The true consciousness (zhenshi 真識) is associated with the rope in this simile (which does not change) while the false consciousness (wangshi 妄識) is like the illusion of a snake (which arises and ceases).

These two (true mind and false mind) are not separate but are ultimately in union as essence-function (體用論, ti-yong). Huiyuan understand this metaphysics as being supported by the Daśabhūmika-sūtra's statement that the twelve links of dependent arising come from one mind (一心), which he understood as referring to the unconditioned mind of thusness. As such, according to Ming-Wood Liu the main philosophy of Huiyuan relies on "the ontological dependence of all phenomenal beings whether physical or mental on the intrinsically pure mind which every sentient being originally possesses".

In his commentary on the Ten Stages Treatise of Vasubandhu, Huiyuan argues that the essence of all things, the buddha-nature, the tathāgatagarbha (buddha womb), which he also calls the absolute mind, is also the source of all dependently arisen reality:

Reaching the limit of the original nature, everything is collected only by the absolute aspect of dependent arising. This is the principle of the absolute aspect of dependent arising. As the Dasabhumika sutra says: "all twelve links of the chain of dependent arising are created by one mind." "All is created by mind" means that all is created by the absolute mind".

Huiyuan's thought also relies on the Yogacara schema of the eight consciousnesses. In this schema, the foundational consciousness (which is the ground for all phenomena) is the storehouse consciousness (ālāyavijñāna). Huiyuan glosses this term as supreme consciousness, pure consciousness, true consciousness, tathata consciousness and root consciousness. It is the intrinsically pure and eternal origin of all things but can be covered up by the defilements and thus it is the tathāgatagarbha which is the pure basis for all other consciousnesses (as taught in the Laṅkāvatāra-sūtra). He further describes the relationship between the foundational consciousness (ālāyavijñāna) and the deluded seventh consciousness as being like a body and its shadow.

Regarding the defiled and deluded element of consciousness, Huiyuan reserves the term ādāna-vijñāna (grasping consciousness) for this. Thus, while in most Indian Yogacara texts, the term ādāna-vijñāna was just a synonym for the ālāyavijñāna (which was seen as containing defiled karmic seeds), Huiyuan mostly reserves the term ālāya for the pure consciousness (amalavijñāna) or buddha-nature, and uses ādāna-vijñāna for the defiled and deluded consciousness. This false consciousness is described by Huiyuan as "the ground of the original ignorance" which is the cause of all false thoughts and objects (including all the senses and sense organs), the source of the defilements, discrimination and clinging to the self. However, this false consciousness is not the final source of all things, since it is itself totally reliant on the true mind for its existence. Thus, Huiyuan writes that "the false self (ādāna) arises dependent on the true self (ālāya)".

As such, Huiyuan teaches an ultimate foundational consciousness that is pure but is covered over by a defiled consciousness. This is explained in Huiyuan's Notes on the Meaning of the Treatise on the Ten Grounds Sūtra (Shidijinglun yiji) as follows:

Regarding the true-consciousness, it can be divided into three aspects, that is, substance, characteristics, and function. With respect to "substance," the true- consciousness is known as the tathata, which is profound, tranquil, and equal. Being the final reality which is of one flavor, it remains self-same whether when hidden or when manifested, whether amidst defilements or [the state of] purity. It remains placid at all times, and falls neither under [the category of] cause nor under [the category of] effect. With respect to "characteristics," this consciousness is the cognitive mind pertaining to [the realm of] the tathagatagarbha, and is constituted of buddha-dharmas [as numerous as] the sand of the Ganges; just as the cognitive mind pertaining to [the realm of] worldly dharmas is constituted of [the features of] pain and impermanence. When this true mind is in [the state of] falsehood, its [excellent] characteristics are obscured and [so] is described as "defiled." When it is freed from the bonds of defilement, it is counted as "pure." When its pure characteristics are not yet fully [restored], it is known as the "cause." When its pure characteristics are perfected, it is known as the "effect" .... As for "function," when the true- consciousness is in a defiled state, it is allied to false thoughts and produces [the realm of] samsara. When it is in a pure condition, it produces [various] deeds of virtue in response to [the vices it is trying to] eliminate. When the deeds of virtue are not yet perfected, this mind is known as the "cause" of expedient acts. When the deeds of virtue come to final completion, it is known as the "effect" of expedient acts.

For Huiyuan, the true mind as substance is the profound and tranquil ultimate reality which is eternal, unchanging and without beginning. However, the true mind also has functions, which means that it is the ontological ground for samsara and nirvana. The myriad manifestations of this true mind when it interacts with worldly dharmas are the "characteristics". However, unlike worldly dharmas, these are the excellent attributes of the buddha-nature. When these buddha dharmas are obscured by delusion, consciousness is described as defiled or as the "cause" and when the obscurations are removed, it is the "fruit". Thus, while Huiyuan saw the pure consciousness as distinct from the impure consciousnesses, he also held that the pure consciousness and all the other eight consciousnesses were blended together and thus non-dual. Thus, in his Compendium of the Purport of Mahāyāna, Huiyuan states:

As samsara and nirvana arise and are formed from the true mind, "functions" (yung, that is, samsara and nirvana) do not exist apart from "substance" (ti, that is, the true mind). This perfect harmony of "substance" and "function" is known as [the truth of] non-duality.

If the foundational true mind is pure, how does it give rise to the defiled and deluded mind? According to Huiyuan, ignorance (avidyā) is able to permeate the pure mind. As he writes in the Compendium:

As there is at first the tathata (the pure mind), there arises subsequently ignorance, the cause of defilements. As there is ignorance, the cause of defilements, which permeates the tathata (the pure mind), there arises the false mind (the first seven consciousnesses)....Since the tathata transcends [all] distinctions, it can give rise to ignorance. Since the tathata's enlightened nature is covered by delusions, it produces the false mind.

While the pure mind remains eternally tranquil in its essential nature, its phenomenal aspect can be contaminated by ignorance. Thus, the true mind, the ālāya, can be divided into two aspects of consciousness: the immaculate or pure consciousness (amalavijñāna), and the ālāyavijñāna. In some presentations (e.g. in the Compendium), Huiyuan posits a system of nine consciousnesses as was done by masters of the Shelun school of his time. Huiyuan also draws on the simile of water and waves. He compares the purity of consciousness to the nature of ocean water, which always retains its nature as being water. When it is agitated by wind (ignorance), waves appear on the ocean (the defiled consciousnesses). The waves are not essential to water, since water can exist without waves, but even in waves, the nature of water remains. Huiyuan also says in the Compendium that ignorance "does not exist apart from the pure mind", which he terms the "union of true and false". This refers to how the true consciousness "on being permeated by bad habits [in existence from] the beginning-less past, gives rise to the ground of ignorance".

Huiyuan also rejected the Madhyamaka idea that the ultimate reality was merely the emptiness of dharmas, writing "we assert that the tathagatagarbha is truly non-empty. As the [true]-consciousness embodies buddha-dharmas [as numerous as] the sand of the Ganges, how can it be taken as empty?" For Huiyuan, the statements which qualify the ultimate reality as empty merely refer to its lack of discrimination and delusion (as taught in the Lankavatara), not to a denial of the true existence of the true substance, which is unceasing.

=== Pure Land thought ===
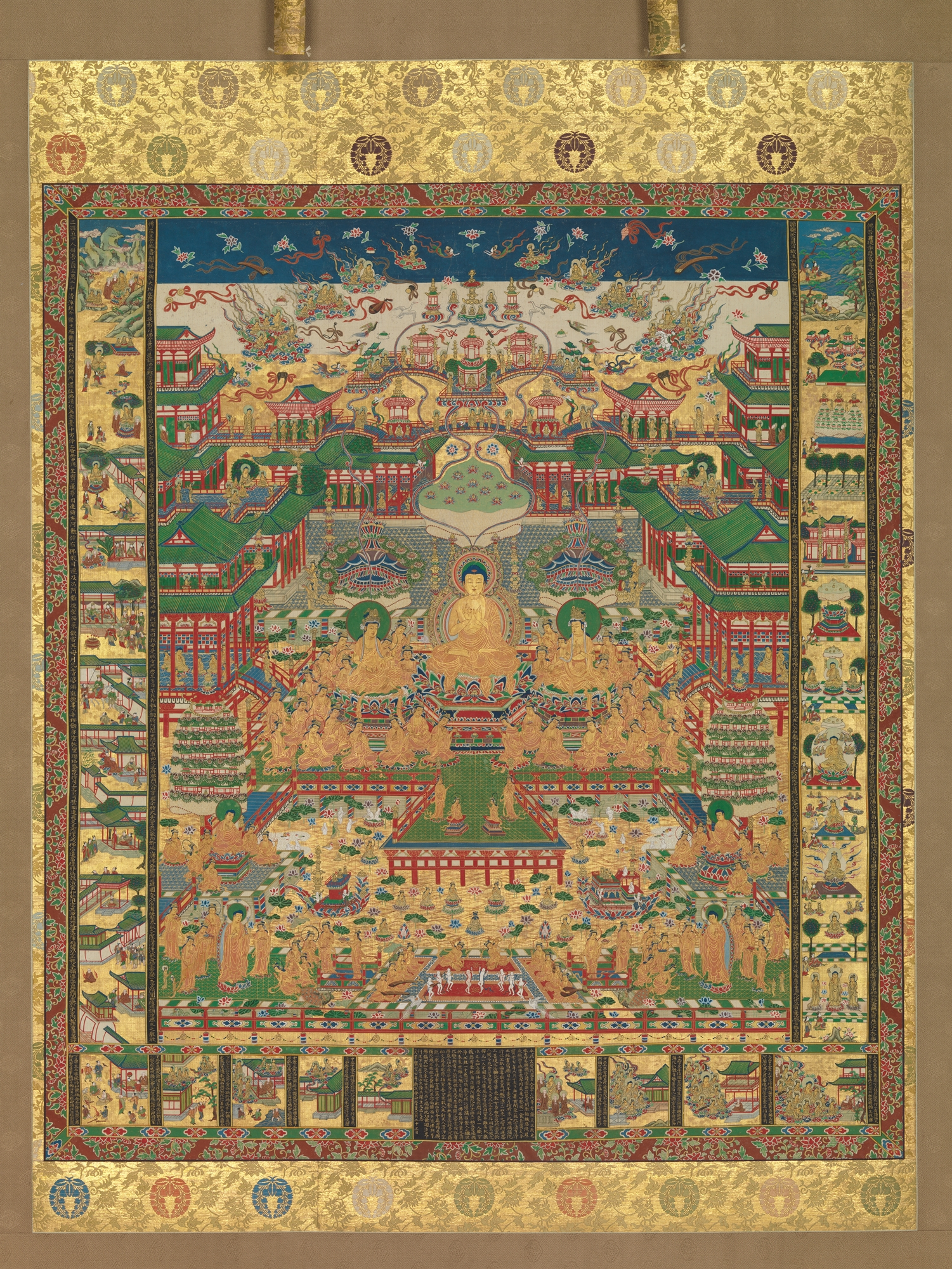
Copy of the Taima Mandala, which is based on the visualizations taught in the Amitāyus Contemplation Sūtra

Jingying Huiyuan's Dilun lineage was associated with devotion to Amitabha Buddha and his pure land since the time of Bodhiruci, who is cited as one of the six worthies of Pure Land by Daochuo, as having converted Tanluan to Pure Land Buddhism, and as the translator of the Sukhāvatīvyūha Sūtra and Vasubandhu's Rebirth Treatise. Likewise, Huikuang (the teacher of Fashang, Huiyuan's teacher) is also said to have been a Pure Land devotee (along with several of his disciples) according to Daoxuan's (596–667) Further Biographies of Eminent Monks (T 2060). Thus it is not surprising that Huiyuan wrote commentaries to two Pure Land sutras (Sukhāvatīvyūha and Contemplation Sutra).

In his commentary on the Contemplation Sūtra (觀經, Guānjīng), Huiyuan claims that the main intention of the sutra is the guānfo-samadhi (the meditative absorption of buddha-contemplation). He also claims that this sutra is a sudden teaching (as opposed to other, "gradual" Mahayana teachings) placing it on the level as sutras like the Srimala and the Vimalakirti. According to Huiyuan: "since it is taught for the sake of pṛthagjanas [fanfu, ordinary people] and not entered by way of Hinayana, this teaching is known as the 'sudden teaching.'" Since Huiyuan held that the sutra was taught for ordinary worldlings (Ch: fanfu, which for Huiyuan means all beings below the first bodhisattva stage) and that its main intent was visualization practice. Thus he did not believe that this practice was too difficult for commoners (as was held in by later Japanese Pure Land figures), rather he believed it was taught for them and thus accessible to them.

Huiyuan further argues that there are two main causes for Buddha visualization meditation. The first cause refers to two visions, the second cause is the making of a vow to be born in the Pure Land. Regarding the two visions, they are the initial "vision of unrefined pure faith" (ts'u ching hsin chien) and the final "vision of true reality" (chen shih chien). The vision of unrefined pure faith arises from listening to the teachings of the Bodhisattva Pitaka, learning that there are an infinite number of Buddhas and then to visualize the Buddha, focusing on the image and restraining one's mind in concentration (Ch: ting). In the vision of true reality, one has a personal direct vision of a Buddha (either in a pure land or through supernatural powers). Huiyuan may have derived this teaching from a passage in the Bodhisattvabhumi.

However, visualization is not the only way to reach the pure land since according to Huiyuan, there are four main causes for rebirth in the Pure Land of Amitabha:

1. the cultivation of visualization (hsiu kuan, i.e. the sixteen visualizations taught in the Contemplation sutra),
2. the cultivation of acts (hsiu yeh, the three pure acts taught to Vaidehi in the Contemplation sutra),
3. the cultivation of mind (hsiu hsin, which refers to the three minds: the sincere mind, the deep mind, and the mind aspiring for rebirth by transferring merit),
4. devotion (kuei hsiang) which refers to: contemplation (nien), worship (li) praise (t'an), and recitation of his (Amitabha's) name (ch'eng ch'i ming).

The last element of devotion is crucial for later pure land Buddhism, and, according to Tanaka, "among those surviving Chinese commentarial texts discussed, Hui yüan's Commentary is the earliest to include recitation as a formal, comprehensive category of causal practice for rebirth". Furthermore, Tanaka also notes that Pure land patriarch Shandao's "five correct practices" (sutra recitation, visualization, worship of Amitabha, oral recitation of Amitabha's name, and praising Amitabha) are very similar to Huiyuan's four causes for birth, "since all the elements of the former can be found in the latter's earlier category". Indeed, Shandao agrees with Huiyuan on various key points, such as classifying the Contemplation sutra as a sudden teaching.

However, Shandao and Huiyuan do disagree on several key issues. For example, Huiyuan sees Amitabha and Sukhavati as transformation bodies (nirmanakayas) while for Shandao, they are reward bodies (sambhogakaya). While they differ on this point, Shandao does borrow Huiyuan's schema of pure land types, since Huiyuan is the first Chinese figure to provide a schema for three types of pure land (one for each aspect of the triple Buddha body or trikaya).

Another difference between Shandao and Huiyuan is that, while Shandao agrees with Huiyuan that the main intent of the Contemplation sutra includes buddha visualization (guanfo), Shandao also adds buddha recollection (nianfo) as part of the sutra's intent. Like Shandao, Huiyuan also argues that the power of devotional acts (including reciting nianfo) can take all types of beings to the pure land, though this is restricted to the three lower lotus grades of rebirth:

Despite the fact that those of the lowest grades have created evil karma in this life, they will gain rebirth [in the Pure Land] through the power of devotion (kuei hsiang chih li) with the virtuous teacher guiding them.

Regarding the nine grades of rebirth, Huiyuan's analysis is perhaps the earliest such commentary on this hotly debated Pure Land teaching. According to Huiyuan, the two highest grades are for bodhisattvas on the bhumis, the third grade is for ordinary people (Ch: fanfu, Skt. pṛthagjana) who have attained the lower stages of the bodhisattva path (the stages of resolution and lineage), the fourth grade is for Hinayana aryas, while the five lower grades are all for ordinary people (fanfu) of different types. This contrasts with Shandao's exposition of the grades, which holds that all nine grades are for common worldlings. However, according to Tanaka, "for Hui yüan, the nine grades comprised the object of the fourteenth, fifteenth, and sixteenth of the sixteen visualizations...Hui yüan explicitly assigns the nine grades as objects of visualization that directly inspire the devotees engaged in the visualizations towards higher ranks of rebirth in the Pure Land." This is why Huiyuan can argue that the sutra was taught for the sake of ordinary worldlings while also including aryas (noble beings on higher stages of awakening) into his ranking of the nine grades. This is different from Shandao's way of looking at the nine grades, since for him they are "descriptive statements of the nature and capability of the devotees".

Huiyuan is also the earliest figure to employ the terms "meditative good act" (ting shan) and "non-meditative good act" (san shan). For Huiyuan, meditative good acts refer to all the visualizations taught in the Contemplation sutra while non meditative good acts refer to the three pure acts taught to Vaidehi in the Contemplation sutra. These terms were adopted by many later important commentators including Jizang, Zhiyi and Shandao. However, for Shandao, only the first thirteen visualizations count as meditative, while the others (which focus on the nine grades) he sees as non-meditative and as being linked to recitation of the Buddha's name (nianfo). Thus Shandao emphasizes recitation much more than Huiyuan, who emphasizes the visualization meditations.

Huiyuan's Pure Land commentaries are also important because he is the first commentator to group the "three pure land sutras" (Amitabha Sutra, Amitayus Sutra and Contemplation sutra) into a single set, a grouping that became the canonical set of Pure Land sutras for all later Pure Land Buddhists. According to Tanaka "by placing the Kuan ching [Contemplation Sutra] among the major sutras of his time, Hui yüan legitimatized the Kuan ching as a crucial text for Buddhist exegesis." Huiyuan also attempts to reconcile various inconsistencies between these various sutras. For example, while the Amitayus sutra states that beings who commit the five grave offenses are exclusive from the Pure Land, the Contemplation Sutra does not. Huiyuan writes that this is because the visualization method taught in the Contemplation Sutra is strong enough to erase the evil karma of past transgressions.

=== Doctrinal classification ===
Like other Chinese scholars of the time, Huiyuan developed a system of doctrinal classification of Buddhist scripture (panjiao). In his Mahayana Compendium, he provides a schema that divides the various classes of Buddhist scripture as follows:

1. Doctrine that establishes nature (Doctrine of causation) – Shallow Hinayana (Abhidharma)
2. Doctrine that refutes nature (Doctrine of provisional names) – Profound Hinayana (Chengshilun)
3. Doctrine that refutes form (Doctrine of the false) – Shallow Mahayana which explains the relative truth, the provisional nature of things and the nonexistence of dharmas.
4. Doctrine that manifests the Real (Doctrine of the truth) – Profound Mahayana, which according to Huiyuan "advocates that dharmas exist on the basis of deluded thoughts, which are without substance and necessarily rely on truth. This truth is none other than the 'nature of tathagatagarbha'".

This schema has also been attributed to Hui kuang, the founder of the Dilun tradition. According to Huikuang, the shallow Mahayana refers to the Large Prajñāpāramitā Sūtra while the profound Mahayana refers to the Avatamsaka, Nirvana sutra and others. However, Huiyuan avoided citing any specific sutras for the two categories of Mahayana teaching. This is because, as Tanaka explains:

a given Mahayana sutra can simultaneously expound two separate doctrines, and thus it would be incorrect to identify a sutra with only one doctrine. As an example, Hui yüan notes that the Nirvana sutra* teaches the doctrines of emptiness as well as of non emptiness, which, in Hui yüan's scheme, correspond, respectively, to the false and true doctrines. For this reason, Hui yüan advocated listing doctrines rather than texts as a basis for his doctrinal classification schema.

Thus, since all Mahayana texts contain the doctrines which reveal the "false" as well as the "true" meaning, Huiyuan's commentaries are quite inclusive, drawing on a vast array of scriptures and ideas to explain his views.

Although Huiyuan refuses to identify the two Mahayana doctrines with specific sutras, Tanaka writes that the "doctrine of the false" clearly refers to the teaching of emptiness as contrasted with the "true doctrine" of non-emptiness taught in the Nirvana sutra. Japanese scholars thus interpret the doctrine of falsehood here to be referring to the Madhyamaka school while the true doctrine to be referring to the teaching of buddha-nature.

== Influence ==
Jingying Huiyuan's commentaries on the Pure Land sutras significantly shaped East Asian Pure Land doctrine. They were particularly influential in authenticating the Pure Land teaching, especially that of the Contemplation Sutra, in the context of mainstream Indian Mahayana thought. Huiyuan's commentary on the Amitayus Contemplation Sutra is the earliest extant treatise on this major Pure Land scripture and the first text to treat this sutra as being on the same level as the other Pure Land sutras. This work elevated the sutra's prominence in East Asian Buddhism. It is closely relied upon by Zhiyi's commentary on the Contemplation Sutra.

Huiyuan's work also influenced the key Pure land patriarch Shandao, especially Shandao's commentary on the Contemplation Sutra. According to Tanaka, the Pure land patriarch Shandao "agreed with Hui yüan on many points, and when he did disagree, he regarded Hui yüan's position as the standard on the subject." Tanaka even writes that Shandao "not only knew about Hui yüan's views but also, consciously or unconsciously, worked within that very framework established by Hui yüan." Furthermore, Tanaka writes that Shandao's reliance on Huiyuan makes sense since he is said to have studied at Wu chen Monastery on Mount Zhongnan near the capital of Chang'an (modern Xi'an). This monastery was "built by the followers of Ching yeh (564 616), who was a direct disciple of Hui yüan". Thus, according to Tanaka, "quite likely, Shan tao's training at this monastery, founded by a direct disciple of Hui yüan and composed of monks involved with the Kuan ching, provided him with an opportunity to become familiar with Hui yüan's thought."

Apart from Shandao, Huiyuan is also cited by many later commentators on the Contemplation Sutra as well. Huiyuan's commentary also influenced Korean Pure land commentaries during the Silla era, which in turn contributed to the development of Japanese Pure Land thought in the Nara and Heian periods.

Huiyuan's philosophy of the true mind was a major influence on the philosophy of later Chinese Buddhism (which is centered on buddha-nature metaphysics). Huiyuan's teaching that all reality arises from the buddha-nature, which sees buddha-nature as the "essence" of nirvāṇa and saṃsāra (the "functions") is sometimes termed the theory of the "dependent origination of the tathāgatagarbha" (rulaizang yuanqi). Huiyuan's theory is a precursor to later Huayan interpretations of essence-function theory as well as their theory of the "dependent arising of the Dharmadhatu". It was influential on Huayan patriarchs like Zhiyan and Fazang.

Furthermore, Huiyuan's buddha-nature thought is also a precursor to the East Asian Buddhist idea that even insentient things have Buddha nature. Huiyuan never explicitly states that insentient phenomena have buddha-nature. However, according to Shuman Chen:

Huiyuan posits that Buddha-nature, like space, pervades everywhere and all beings, including insentient objects. Huiyuan examines Buddha-nature from two aspects: the knowing (the subject) and the known (the object). He argues that the insentient world shares with sentient beings the Buddha-nature that is known, which is equivalent to inconceivable emptiness, the Middle-way, and dharma-nature, yet lacks sentient beings’ propensities for knowing, i.e., consciousness, true mind, awareness, or wisdom of realization. As such, the Buddha-nature of insentient beings, for Huiyuan, is merely inert and can be recognized only by sentient beings, whose Buddha-nature, in contrast, can either be concealed—like the full moon covered by clouds—or serve as the basis of practices, allowing them to wake up from the dreams of ignorance.

== Works ==
Huiyuan wrote numerous commentaries on key Mahayana scriptures Some of his main works include:

- Compendium of the Purport of Mahāyāna (Dasheng yi zhang 大乘義章, Taisho no. 1851), which contains numerous essays or treatises, like Essay on the Three Means of Pramana (San liang zhi yi) and Treatise on the two truths (Erdi-yi, 二諦義). According to Tsujimori Yoshu, a part of the Compendium may have been the work of another figure, Hui hsiu (548 ?) and that Huiyuan relied on this and expanded it to create his Compendium. It also may be based on a similar work by Fashang, the Tseng shu fa men (which does not survive).
- Notes on the Meaning of the Treatise on the Ten Grounds Sūtra (Shidijinglun yiji 十地經論義記, ZZ1.71.2 and 3) (survives in fragmentary form)
- Notes on the Meaning of the Mahāparinirvāṇa Sūtra (Da panniepanjing yiji 大般涅槃經義記, T 1764), in ten fascicles
- Notes on the Meaning of the Vimalakīrti Sūtra (Weimojing yiji 維摩經義記, T 1776), in eight fascicles
- Commentary on the Meaning of the Amitayus Sūtra (Wuliang shou jing yishu 無量壽經義疏) in two fascicles
- Commentary on the Meaning of the Amitayus Contemplation Sūtra (Guan wuliangshou jing yishu 觀無量壽經義疏) in two fascicles, translated into English in Tanaka (1990)
- Notes on the Meaning of the Śrīmālādevī Sūtra (Shengmanjing yiji 勝鬘經義記, ZZ1.30.4) in one fascicle (survives in fragmentary form)
- Commentary to the Awakening of Faith (大乘起信論義疏, T 1843). Some modern scholars have questioned this attribution, but Huiyuan's authorship has been defended by others, like Huanzhen Feng and Yoshizu Yoshihide.
- Commentary on the Yogacarabhumi in ten fascicles (incomplete) (ZZ 1.61.3)
- Commentary on the Sutra on Saunas (and Baths of the Saṃgha), 溫室經義記, 1 fascicle (T 1793.39)
- Commentary on the Lotus Sūtra (Fahuajing shu 法華經疏) (not extant)
- Commentary on the Flower Garland Sūtra (Huayanjing shu 華嚴經疏) (not extant)

== Sources ==
- Chen, Shuman. "The Liberation of Matter: Examining Jingxi Zhanran’s Philosophy of the Buddha-Nature of Insentient Beings in Tiantai Buddhism," p. 131. PhD diss., Northwestern University, 2014.
- Jorgensen, John; Lusthaus, Dan; Makeham, John; Strange, Mark, trans. (2019), Treatise on Awakening Mahāyāna Faith, New York, NY: Oxford University Press, ISBN 9780190297718
- Ming-Wood Liu [廖明活]. The Essentials of Jingying Huiyuan’s Thought (Jingying Huiyuan sixiang shuyao 淨⼙慧遠思 想述要) Taipei: Taiwan xuesheng shuju, 1999.
- Ming-Wood Liu. (1985). The Mind-Only Teaching of Ching-ying Hui-yüan: An Early Interpretation of Yogācāra Thought in China. Philosophy East and West, 35(4), 351–376. doi:10.2307/1398535
- Okamoto Ippei, "Jōyō ji Eon no chosaku no zengo kankei ni kansuru shiron" 淨影寺慧遠の著作の前後関係に関する試論 (On the Chronological Relationship of Writings by Huiyuan of Jingying Monastery).
- Tanaka, Kenneth K. 1990. The Dawn of Chinese Pure Land Buddhist Doctrine: Ching-ying Hui-yüanʼs Commentary on the Visualization Sutra. Albany: State University of New York Press.
