= Kyŏnghŭng (monk) =

Silla Buddhist monk (fl. 8th century)

Kyŏnghŭng (Korean: 경흥, also spelled Kyeong-heung; Chinese: 憬興; ca. 620–700) was a prominent Korean Buddhist monk from Baekje who was active in Silla in the 7th century as state elder (國老) of the Buddhist community. He was a scholar of Yogācāra who is one of Silla's three great Buddhist writers, alongside Wŏnhyo and Taehyŏn, representing the orthodox Buddhism of Silla Era Korean Buddhism. He is said to have written over forty works in about 230 fascicles, but most are now lost.

Only two works of his survive, a Record of Combined Commentaries on the Sutra of Immeasurable Life and the Commentary on the Three Maitreya Sutras. His Commentary on the Sutra of Immeasurable Life was influential in the development of Japanese Pure Land Buddhism.

== Life and works ==
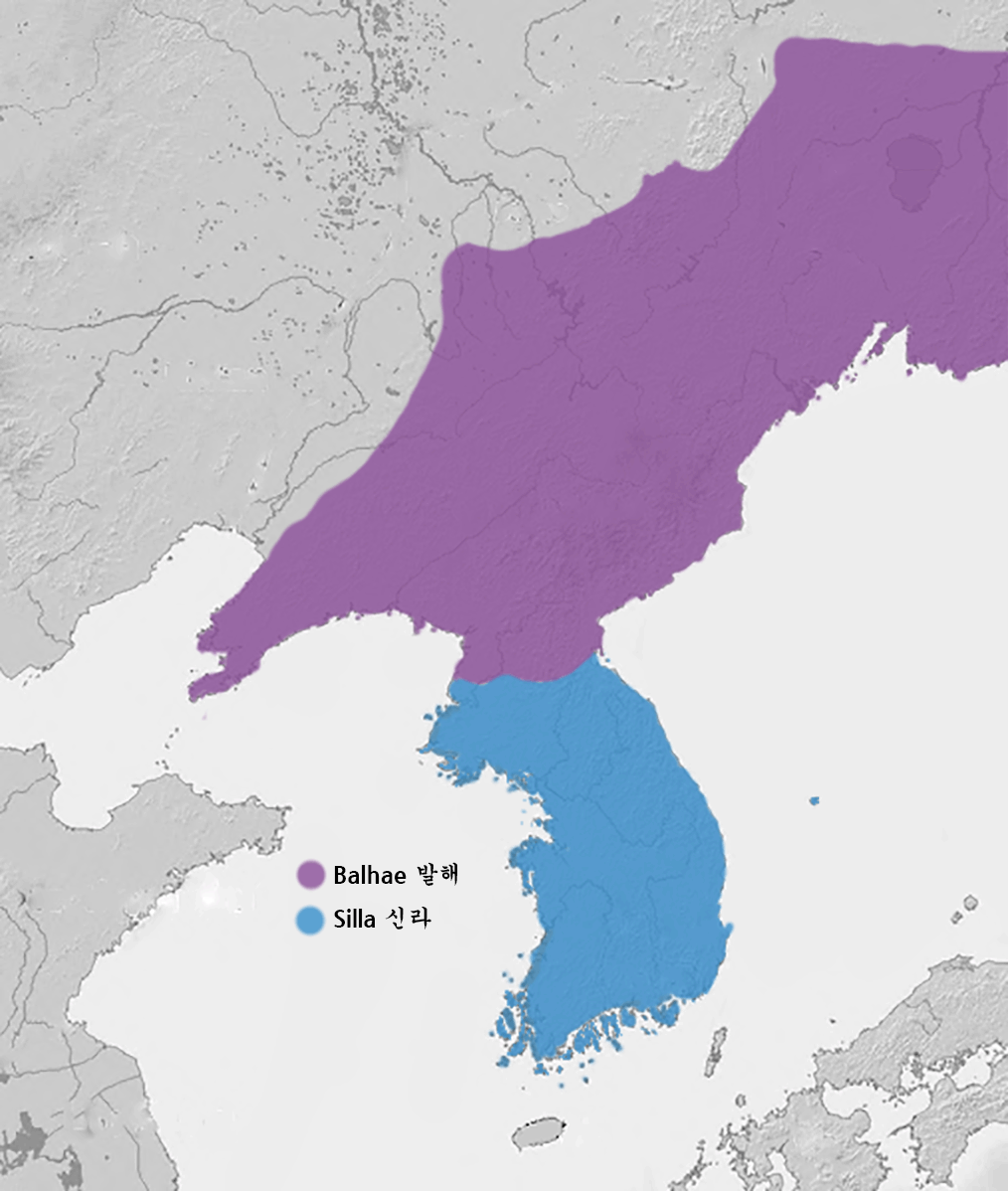
Unified Silla in the south during the Northern and Southern States period (698–926), along with its rival, Balhae.

Kyŏnghŭng was a learned scholar monk from the Baekje Kingdom. He was born in Ungch’ŏ n (熊川, modern Kongju) during the time the kingdom was absorbed into the Silla Kingdom. Kyŏnghŭng was appointed national preceptor of Silla in the first year of King Sinmun's reign (681 CE) and he lived at Samnang Monastery in the Silla capital of Gyeongju. He was active during the reigns of King Munmu (r. 661–681), King Sinmun (r. 681–692), and into the reign of King Seongdeok (r. 702–737).

Kyŏnghŭng's Record of Combined Commentaries on the Sutra of Immeasurable Life (Ch: 無量壽經連義述文贊, Muryangsu-gyŏng yŏnŭisul munch’an, Taisho No. 1748) played a fundamental role in systematizing and defending Pure Land thought in Korea. This Chinese language commentary is one of the most frequently cited texts by Shinran in his Kyōgyōshinshō alongside the works Shandao and Tanluan. Kyŏnghŭng's commentary is notable for its length and detailed analysis. Kyŏnghŭng also wrote commentaries on the Contemplation Sutra and the Amitabha Sutra. Though both are now lost, they are known to have reached Japan and were quoted by Jōdo-shū authors.

== Pure Land teaching ==
Stone Standing Amitabha Buddha from the Silla era Gamsansa Temple, Gyeongju

Kyŏnghŭng's Pure Land thought is closely influenced by the work of the Faxiang school of Yogacara. He cites Kuiji widely for example, as well as the Faxiang monk Xuan-Ying (玄應), a translator from the Faxiang Ci'en Monastery (慈恩寺). The influence of the Buddhabhūmisūtra-śāstra (佛地經論), an Indian Yogacara treatise, is also evident in his work. He also relies on the work of Huaigan, who was another Pure Land author who draws heavily on Yogacara thought.

Kyŏnghŭng's Commentary on the Sutra of Immeasurable Life (i.e. the Larger Pure Land Sutra) is known for its detailed exegesis of the sutra's forty-eight vows of Dharmakara bodhisattva. In particular, Kyŏnghŭng emphasized the 18th, 19th and 20th vows as the most important, since they pertain to "gathering those to be reborn" [in the Pure Land]. Furthermore, he categorized these three key vows based on the three grades of rebirth taught in the sutra as follows:

- the 18th Vow (Vow to Gather the Highest Grade)
- the 19th Vow (Vow to Gather the Middle Grade)
- the 20th Vow (Vow to Gather the Lowest Grade)

According to Watanabe Kensho, this theory was based on the thought of the Silla master Fabi, who argued that the 18th Vow corresponded to the three grades of rebirth. Kyŏnghŭng also refutes a competing theory by Silla master Yiji, who argued that the 18th Vow corresponded to the lowest grade, the 19th Vow the highest grade, and the 20th Vow the middle grade.

=== The exclusion clause ===
A key issue taken up by Kyŏnghŭng is that of the "exclusion and inclusion of the five grave offenses and slanderers [of the True Dharma]" (逆謗除取說). This has to do with how the 18th vow in the Larger Sutra includes an exclusion clause which states that people who commit the five heinous offenses (anatariya karmas) and slander the Dharma are excluded from birth by the 18th vow. Kyŏnghŭng's commentary defends the idea that we must read the 18th vow by relying on the Contemplation Sutra, which says that even those who commit the five heinous offenses can be reborn through the Buddha's vow-power. Furthermore, he critiques those who say that those who slander the Dharma cannot be born in the Pure Land. This is because the Contemplation Sutra also argues that those who "possess all unwholesome [deeds]," can still be born there.

As such, Kyŏnghŭng's position interprets the Larger Pure Land Sutra and the Contemplation Sutra as communicating the same core message of universal liberation through mindfulness of Amitabha Buddha, even though beings are still born in different grades of rebirth into the Pure Land based on their level of merit. Kyŏnghŭng reconciles the difference between the 18th Vow of the Larger Sutra and the "lowest of the lowest grade" section of the Contemplation Sutra by arguing that their seeming differences are only on the relative level of skillful means (upaya) based on the capacities of the beings they are referring to. Since the passage of the 18th Vow is directed to those of the highest grade, it excludes the rebirth of those who have slandered the Dharma. The Contemplation Sutra's teaching which mentions universal salvation is directed at the lowest of the lowest grade, and thus includes those who have slandered the Dharma.

Kyŏnghŭng also discusses and refutes numerous theories and interpretations of the 18th vow and how one attains birth in the Pure Land. For example, Kyŏnghŭng refutes the view of Master Wŏnhyo's (617–686) commentary on the Larger Sutra which says that only those who repent of their past misdeeds can attain birth. Kyŏnghŭng says that each of the ten thoughts of Amida Buddha (as taught in the Contemplation Sutra) itself purifies the evil karma of eighty billion eons (kalpas), thus birth in the Pure Land as per the 18th vow and the Contemplation Sutra is not a matter of the presence or absence of repentance. He also critiques the view of Jiacai (ca. 626) who argued that the Larger Sutra teaches exclusion (of birth in the Pure Land to those who've slandered the Dharma and committed the five anatariya karmas) while the Contemplation Sutra teaches a more inclusive rebirth in the Pure Land.

According to Richard McBride II:

Kyŏnghŭng differs from all other Korean commentators treated here because of his opinion that because recollection of the Buddha (yŏmbul 念佛) destroys the sins of eighty million kalpas, beings should neither repent nor be given special allowance to repent. From a philological standpoint he has a strong argument. This is exactly what the passage from the Guanjing says: therefore, recollection of the Buddha is, in and of itself, a kind of cleansing penance practice making the need of performing any other repentance rituals completely unnecessary.

=== Attaining birth in the Pure Land ===
Regarding the interpretation of the "ten recollections" or "ten thoughts" (十念) of the Buddha required for birth in the Pure Land, as mentioned in the 18th vow, Kyŏnghŭng's position agrees with Shandao's view that they are "ten intonations" (shisheng 十聲) or "recitations" of the Buddha's name (i.e. vocal nianfo, a popular practice, easy for an ordinary person to perform). This was a lively debate in Pure Land thought at the time, as some commentators understood this ambiguous term differently to refer to more difficult, elite practices of higher level bodhisattvas. Kyŏnghŭng's more liberal position interprets the ten recollections as ten recitations, similar to how nianfo is taught by the Contemplation Sutra passage on the lowest of the low grades.

Nevertheless, Kyŏnghŭng also disagrees with Shandao and Huaigan's position that the "ten intonations" of Buddha Name recitation taught in the Contemplation Sutra's section on the lowest of the lowest grade correspond exactly to the Larger Sutra's ten intonations. This is because Kyŏnghŭng sees the passage of the 18th vow as referring to the rebirth attained by beings of the highest grade, while he sees the passage from the Contemplation Sutra that mentions ten intonations as being about the lowest grade of birth. Hence he writes:

Now, according to this scripture [the Wuliangshou jing] [although] they necessarily do not commit the heinous crimes in the three rebirths in the highest class [in the Pure Land], they need to eliminate it [unwholesome karma]. That explains the lowest rebirth [in the Pure Land]. Even though they commit the five heinous crimes, if they prepare the ten recollections they will also be reborn [in the Pure Land]; hence, it does not contradict what might be interpreted. You should not wrest the words [of the sutra]! Because [beings who achieve the] three rebirths in the middle class also do not commit the heinous crimes, those who do not need to eliminate [their unwholesome karma] arouse the bodhicitta and cultivate all meritorious virtues. It is already apparent that it does not mean that they have committed heinous crimes. Only the sin of slandering the Right Dharma is deeply serious because over numberless kalpas they will be requited with suffering. [Those who] feign completing the ten intonations are certainly unable to be reborn [in the Pure Land in the lowest rebirth]. Therefore, the sagely teaching still does not have a different explanation because those who enter into all [manner of] unwholesome [activity] will experience much hardship.

Thus, Kyŏnghŭng does not reject the practice of birth through just ten recitations of the Buddha's name as taught by the Contemplation Sutra, he just sees it as the practice of the lowest grade that is thus not that of the 18th vow, but would instead fall under the practice of the 20th vow.

Kyŏnghŭng's position also argues that some degree of effort on our part is necessary for rebirth in the Pure Land, since we must say the name with faith and give rise to bodhicitta (the mind aimed at buddhahood for the sake of all beings). Nevertheless, this degree of effort is easy compared to completing the entire bodhisattva path through the six perfections and ten bodhisattva levels. Furthermore, the three grades differ of rebirth in the Pure Land differ in their level of self-power practice needed: the upper grade cultivates all practices, the middle grade cultivates some merit, and the lower grade recites the Buddha's name ten times or once. Nevertheless, "all alike arouse bodhicitta and single-mindedly recollect Amitābha, this is the same for the majority." As such, Kyŏnghŭng synthesis includes the Pure Land teaching into a Faxiang Yogācāra framework in which self-power and other-power are complementary. The practitioner's efforts (such as arousing the bodhicitta, reciting nianfo, cultivating merit) constitute the cause, while the Buddha's vow-power is the dominant condition that makes birth possible.

Indeed, for Kyŏnghŭng, bodhicitta is a necessary element of attaining birth through thinking of Amitabha Buddha as taught in the Pure Land Sutra. He writes that, "the statement that 'one should generate the bodhicitta' is intended to show that in order to be born there, one must necessarily generate the Great Mind. This is because those of fixed nature (gotra) are excluded from being born there." As such, bodhicitta and the practitioner's single-minded seeking of birth in the Pure Land are important for attaining birth. As an orthodox Yogacara scholar, Kyŏnghŭng also affirms the Yogacara theory of gotra (lineage) here, arguing that those with a fixed lineage in the Hinayana would not be born in the Pure Land.

=== Maitreya's Pure Land and Sukhavati ===
As a Yogacarin, Kyŏnghŭng also delved into the argument between those who promoted the superiority of birth in the Pure Land of Amitabha (Sukhavati) and those who promoted birth in Maitreya's Tuṣita as superior. According McBride II, Kyŏnghŭng "attempted to make sense out of the arguments for both sides, contributed his own opinions to the exegetical dialogue, and concluded by offering a doctrinal approach that concluded that neither 'Pure Land' should be classified as superior to the other."

In his commentary, Kyŏnghŭng actually argues against past Yogacara authors who had stated that attaining birth in Amitabha's Pure Land was too difficult while birth in Maitreya's inner court of Tuṣita was easier. He gives ten reasons why birth in Sukhavati is also relatively easy:

(1) only short-term practice is needed to be reborn in Amitābha’s land; (2) the Buddhas protect the recollection needed for this rebirth; (3) the light found in this land is excellent; (4) Amitābha has made the Original Vow; (5) Amitābha and the holy saints welcome all who are reborn into that land; (6) Amitābha rescues ordinary people; [and] (7) many masters of the past have taught the ease of this rebirth.

Nevertheless, Kyŏnghŭng still saw birth in Tuṣita as a noble goal and as relatively easy as well, and defended this classic Yogacara Pure Land goal with various reasons, such as arguing that Maitreya also an Original Vow, that he welcomes beings by "sending out a ray of light in the same way as Amitābha," that "Tuṣita Heaven is not limited to just the gods", etc. Kyŏnghŭng thus concludes:

For reasons such as these, wise men cannot insist on saying that rebirth in Amitābha’s Pure Land is easy while rebirth in Maitreya’s Tuṣita Heaven is difficult. The ease of rebirth does not always mean a superior result. Rebirth in Amitābha’s Pure Land is extremely difficult, but if one aspires for this rebirth and practices the recitation of the Buddha’s name with fervor, it is attainable. Thus we can call it "the ease of attaining a difficult rebirth."

== Influence on Japanese Pure Land ==
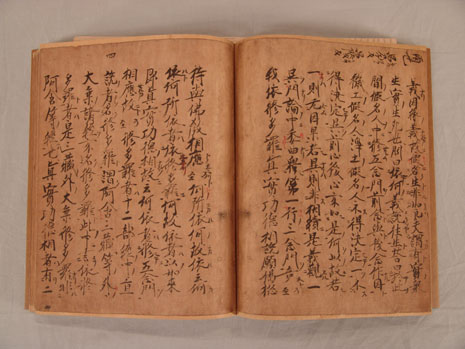
A manuscript of Shinran's Kyōgyōshinshō

Kyŏnghŭng's writings along with those of other Silla Pure Land scholars were transmitted to Japan and were read and quoted by the scholars of Japanese Pure Land Buddhism, such as the Tendai abbot Ryōgen (912–985) and the Tendai Pure Land master Genshin (942–1017). While Hōnen did not cite Kyŏnghŭng, several of his disciples and descendants in the Pure Land school did, including Ryōchū (1199-1287), the third patriarch of the Chinzei sect of the Jōdo-shū, who saw it as one of the four great commentaries on the Larger Sutra, alongside those of Huiyuan, Jizang, and Wonhyo.

Kyŏnghŭng's influence is particularly pronounced in Shinran's (1173–1262) thought, who cites Kyŏnghŭng's Pure Land commentary extensively in his Kyōgyōshinshō. According to Hee-Sung Keel, Shinran quotes Kyŏnghŭng "with greater frequency than any other exegete except T'an-luan (Jp. Donran; 476-542) and Shan-tao (Jp. Zendo; 613-681), the two renowned Chinese masters who decisively influenced Shinran's thought." Furthermore, Shinran almost exclusively relies on Kyŏnghŭng's commentary on the Larger Sutra over and against the Larger Sutra commentaries of other mainland masters (like Huiyuan, Jizang, etc.). According to Hee-Sung, "it is indisputable that Shinran not only relies exclusively on Kyŏnghŭng's commentary but also quotes from it in a number of fairly important locations in his work. In this and many other indirect ways, Kyŏnghŭng's commentary seems to have exerted a significant influence on Shinran's thought."

One reason why Shinran may have been impressed by Kyŏnghŭng's commentary was its emphasis on the Original Vow as being the main foundation for rebirth in the Pure Land. There is also the fact that Shinran treasured the Larger Pure Land sutra as the "true teaching" of the Buddha, and that Kyŏnghŭng's commentary was widely recognized as authoritative by his time. Nevertheless, while Shinran often adopts Kyŏnghŭng's explanations wholesale, he sometimes alters Kyŏnghŭng's passages to support his own understanding of Pure Land Buddhism. Hee-Sung sees this as constituting a creative re-interpretation or eisegesis of Kyŏnghŭng's arguments.

One key way that Kyŏnghŭng's commentary seems to have influenced Shinran is through his emphasis on three key vows: the eighteenth, the nineteenth, and the twentieth. While the tendency to focus on the meaning of these vows as central to the meaning of the sutra is not as pronounced among Chinese commentators, it was much more common among Silla commentators like Kyŏnghŭng. This a crucial point, since the three vows are a major element of Shinran's doctrinal system, which sees each of them as different "gates" to the Pure Land, with the 18th being the highest. However, Shinran's interpretation also differs markedly from Kyŏnghŭng's, who sees the 18th vow as the vow of the higher grade of rebirth. For Shinran, these vows do not relate to different grades of birth (which are ultimately irrelevant for him) but instead, they relate to "how thorough we are in renouncing our own power and merit and relying on other-power." Likewise, for Kyŏnghŭng, birth through the 18th vow excludes the slanderers of the right Dharma (who are instead included in the lowest of the low birth as taught in the Contemplation Sutra).
