= Shandao =

7th-century Chinese Buddhist monk; influential writer in Pure Land Buddhism

- 善導
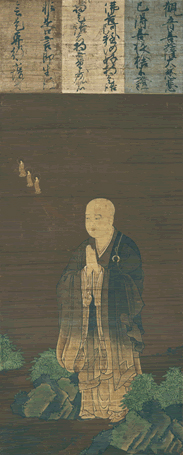
- Shandao, Muromachi period, Ōtani University Museum.

Personal life
- Born: 613 Zibo, Shandong, China
- Died: 681 (aged 67–68) Chang'an, Shaanxi, China
- Notable work: Commentary on the Contemplation Sutra

Religious life
- Religion: Buddhism
- Temple: Wuzhen Temple; Xuanzhong Temple; Wenguo Temple; Fengxian Temple
- School: Pure Land Buddhism
- Dharma name: Shandao

Senior posting
- Teacher: Mingsheng (明勝); Daochuo
- Students: Huaiyun (怀恽) Huaigan (懷感) Shaokang

Shandao (simplified Chinese: 善导大师; traditional Chinese: 善導大師; pinyin: Shàndǎo Dàshī; Japanese: Zendō Daishi; 613–681) was a Chinese Buddhist scholar-monk who is considered a great sage and patriarch in East Asian Pure Land Buddhism. Several modern scholars consider Shandao to be the central figure of the Chinese Pure Land tradition. According to Alfred Bloom, Shandao "systematized Pure Land thought and brought it to its highest peak of development in China."

Shandao was one of the first Pure Land authors to argue that all ordinary people, even the most evil persons, can be reborn in the Pure Land by relying on the karmic power of Amitābha Buddha's past vows. Shandao was also one of the earliest Pure Land authors to teach the primacy of faithfully reciting Amitābha's name (nianfo). Shandao saw this practice as sufficient for birth in the Pure Land, and as the supreme practice (even more important than meditation), though he also wrote on and promoted other ritual practices. Shandao's efforts to teach common laypeople in various ways, like disseminating paintings of the Pure Land, made Pure Land Buddhism much more accessible and popular among the common people.

Shandao's writings had a strong influence on later Pure Land masters, especially his teachings on recitation of the Buddha's name and his explanations of the nature of faith (xìnxīn). His close students include other important Pure Land figures of the time, like the Pure Land patriarch Huaigan (懷感) as well as Huaiyun (懷惲, 640-701). Shandao is also very important for Japanese pure land founders Hōnen and Shinran. In Jōdo Shinshū, he is considered the Fifth Patriarch, while in Chinese Pure Land Buddhism, he is considered the second patriarch after Lushan Huiyuan. Shandao was so influential to the Pure Land tradition that he eventually came to be seen as a manifestation of the Buddha himself (a nirmāṇakāya).

== Biography ==
There are various sources for Shandao's biography, the earliest and most reliable is Further Biographies of Eminent Monks (T 2060) by Daoxuan (596–667), a contemporary of Shandao who also resided with him at Mount Zhongnan.

Shandao (lay name: Chu) was most likely born in 613, in what is now the Linzi county of China's Shandong Province. He became a buddhist monk (bhiksu) early in life under master Master Mingsheng of Mizhou (about whom little is known). With his teacher, Shandao studied the Lotus Sutra and Vimalakirti Sutra.

According to some sources, he once saw a picture of the pure land and this inspired him to attain birth in the pure land for the first time. After receiving the full monastic precepts, Shandao (now twenty years old) read the Contemplation Sutra together with his Vinaya Master Miaokai and concluded that Buddhist practices other than the pure land method were too uncertain and difficult. He then spent some time traveling, visiting temples and teachers. He is said to have visited Mount Lu during this period.

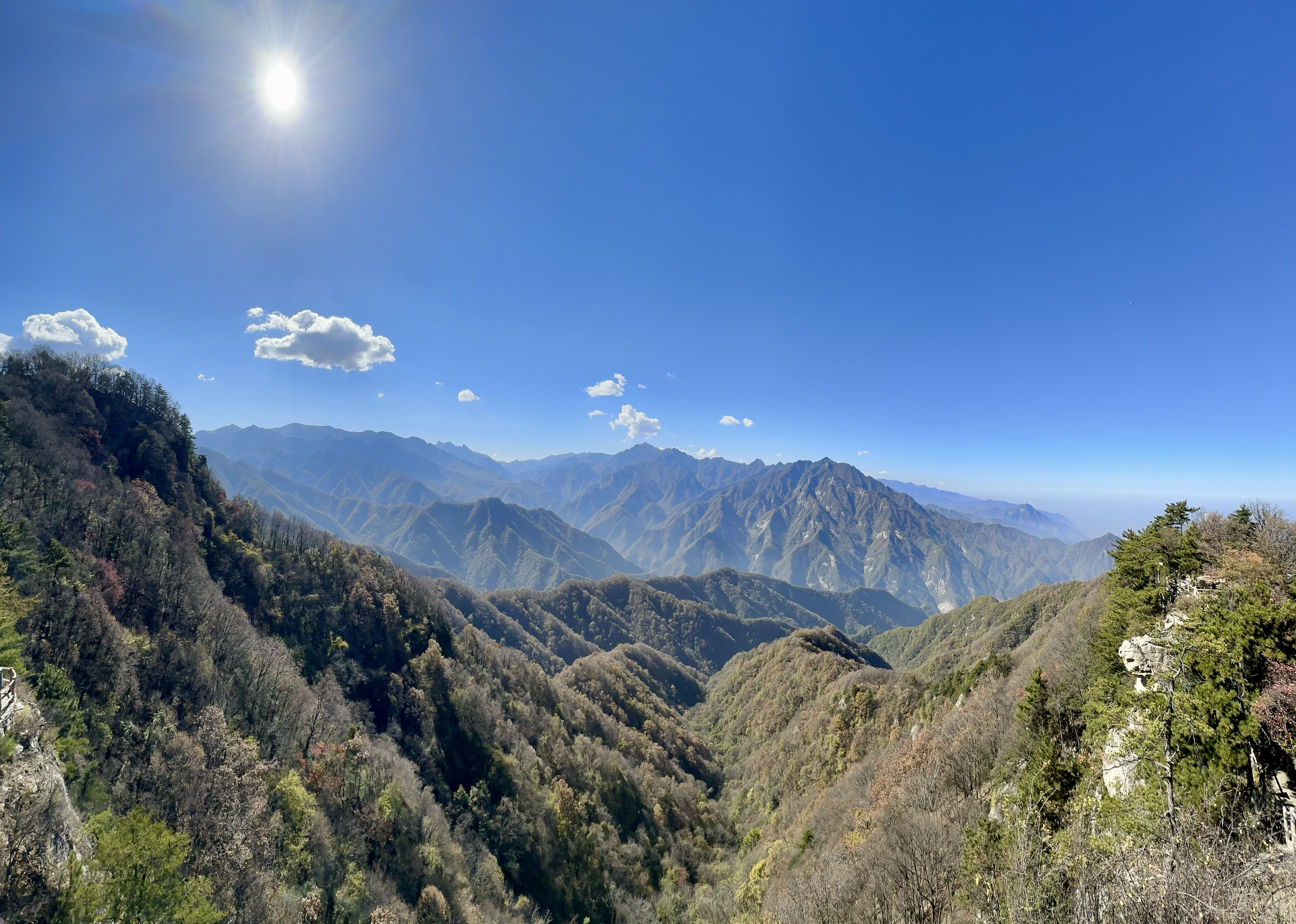
View of the Zhōngnán mountains

In around 633, Shandao also studied at Wu chen Monastery on Mount Zhongnan near the capital of Chang'an (modern Xi'an), a center of pure land meditation practice. This monastery had been built by the followers of Ching yeh (564 616), a direct disciple of Jingying Huiyuan (c. 523–592). Jingying Huiyuan was a great scholar-monk who had written commentaries on the Amitayus Sutra and the Contemplation Sutra. According to Tanaka, Shandao's training at this monastery gave him the opportunity to the study the works of this scholar and Shandao's works do show the influence of Huiyuan. He is also said to have meditated on the visualizations of the Pure Land and attained deep samadhi.

At some point between 633 and 645 (the sources disagree on the dating), Shandao visited the famous Xuanzhong Temple, a major temple of the Pure Land Buddhist masters Tanluan and Daochuo (562–645). Shandao met Daochuo, and was inspired to become Daochuo's disciple. Shandao stayed at Xuanzhong Temple for a few years listening to the lectures of Daochuo, practicing repentance rites and Buddha name recitation and achieving nianfo samadhi.

After Daochuo's death in 645, Shandao returned to Wu-chen temple and also traveled to the imperial capital at Chang'an (modern Shaanxi) to preach Pure Land Buddhism. For 30 years, Shandao preached Pure Land teachings to the lay population of the city, teaching them to chant the nianfo (the name of Amitabha), copying the Pure Land sutras numerous times, distributing copies of the Amitabha sutra, making many paintings of the pure land, restoring monasteries and writings books. He stressed that reciting the Buddha's name was the easiest practice for attaining birth in the pure land. Shandao taught men and women of all classes equally, and even butchers and wine sellers are said to have followed his teachings.

Shandao lived in Chang'an for more than 30 years propagating the Pure Land teachings. Chinese sources indicate that he was a strict practitioner of nianfo (reciting the Buddha's name) and pratyutpanna samadhi meditation, as well as spending much of his time spreading the Pure Land teachings and performing devotional practices to the Buddha, such as circumambulation (around a Buddha statue), and reciting the sutras. He also strictly observed the Buddhist ethical precepts. In spite of his strict and demanding spiritual practice, Shandao still thought of himself as an ordinary worldly person (pṛthagjana), writing: "certainly, I myself am a sinful prthagjana". Thus, he still believed that he (along with most people) needed to rely on the compassionate power of Amitabha Buddha to attain Buddhahood. Nevertheless he became famous as the "Master of Radiant Light" (Guangming Heshang) due to the belief that people had seen rays of light streaming from his mouth when he recited the Buddha's name.

Shandao's activities in the Chang'an capital area centered around four main monasteries: Wuzhen Temple (悟真寺) on Mount Zhongnan (40 km southeast of Chang'an city), Guangming Temple (光明寺), Daci'en Temple (大慈恩寺; during the time that Xuanzang would have resided here) and Shiji Temple (實際寺). Using the wealth donated by his patrons, Shandao undertook the repair of dilapidated temples and stupas. He also worked to create copies of over 100,000 volumes of the Amitabha Sutra. One of these copies was discovered by Tachibana Zuicho in 1909, alongside other fragments of Shandao's works.

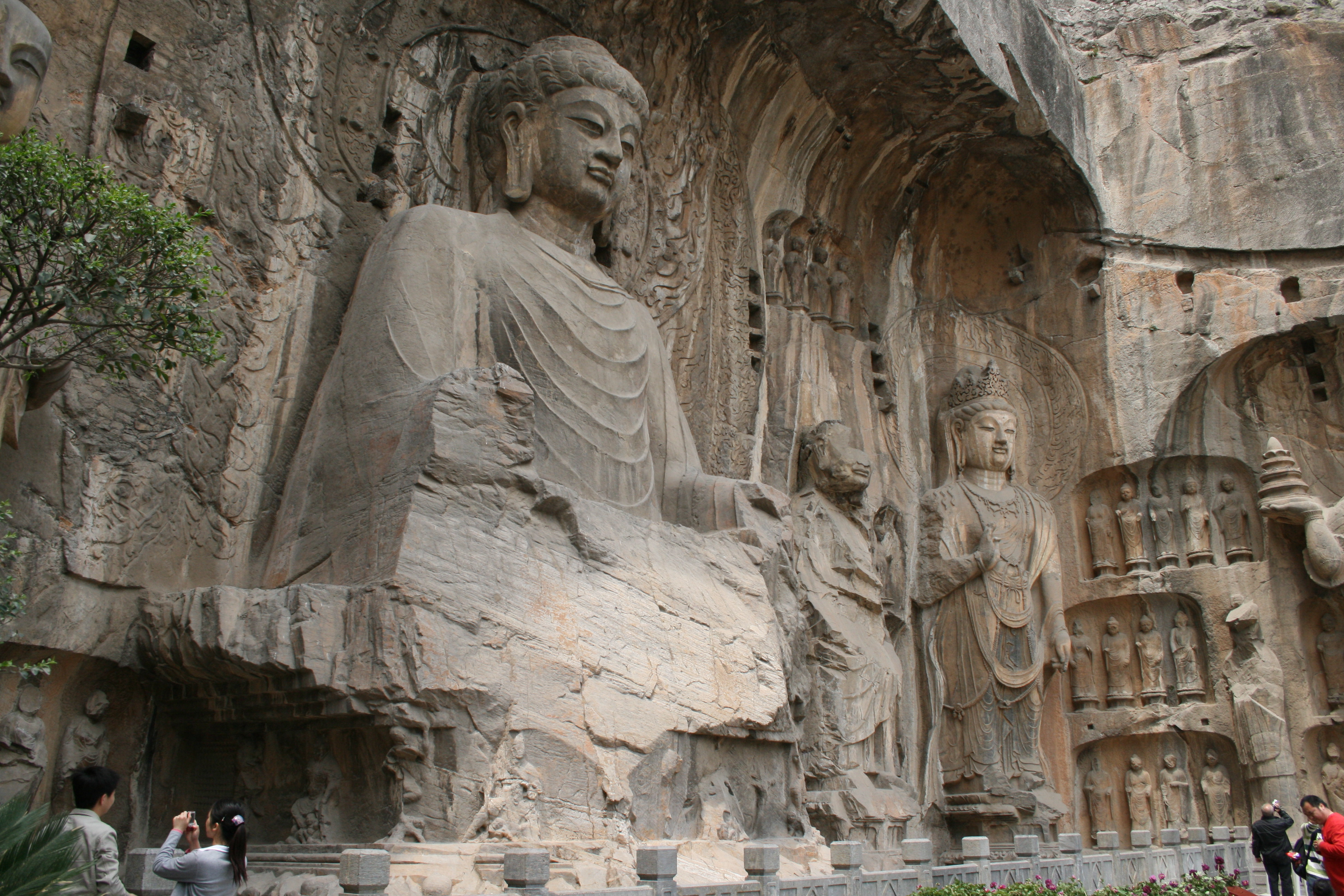
The Vairocana Buddha at Longmen Buddha Grottoes

According to the Historical Biographies of the Pure Land, Shandao painted "painted more than three hundred murals of Pure Land transformation tableaux." These "transformation tableau" (Bianxiang) were paintings illustrated Pure Land stories which were used to teach others. Shandao's paintings were used as prototypes for later tableaux in other temples. In 672, Shandao traveled to Luoyang to oversee the sculptures of the Fengxian Cave Temple ensemble at the Longmen Grottoes, one of China’s greatest Buddhist rock art sites. This particular project was supported by Empress Wu Zetian.

Chinese sources describe Shandao as a man who lived a very simple ascetic life. He preferred begging for his food and did not have a room to himself. He kept the monastic rules strictly and gave away all possessions and gifts. He ate the simplest and coarsest food, and gave the best to others, avoiding even milk products. The Chronicle of Buddha and Patriarchs (Fozu Tongji) states that: "He maintained the precepts flawlessly, without the slightest violation; he offered fine food to the public while living on sparse fare himself."

In his lifetime, Shandao wrote five major works on Pure Land Buddhism, with his commentaries on the Contemplation Sutra being among the most influential.

Shandao had many followers and eminent disciples including Huaigan and Huaiyun. In 681, Shandao passed away and Huaiyun then built Xiangji Temple south of Chang'an, directly north of the Zhongnan Mountains.

== Teachings ==
=== Key ideas ===
Shandao synthesized much of the teachings of earlier Chinese Pure Land Buddhists, such as Tanluan and Daochuo, however, he also introduced new ideas that became central to both Chinese and Japanese Pure Land traditions. The key four ideas of Shandao's thought are:

1. All ordinary people (pṛthagjana) can attain birth in the pure land, no matter how evil or deluded they are, by saying the name of the Buddha Amitabha with faith and relying on the Buddha's Original Vow. Once born there, all beings can equally perceive the pure land (Sukhāvatī) in its true form (as a “reward land”). This attainment does not depend on the meditative qualities or level of purification of the practitioner, instead it depends on the Buddha's vows and merit.
2. The primary practice is oral recitation of the Buddha's name (chiming nianfo). According to Shandao, the ten nianfos cited in both the Infinite Life Sūtra and the Contemplation Sutra (as the bare necessity for attaining rebirth in the pure land) are oral recitations (口稱; kǒuchēng, also called the “ten sounds”, 十聲; shíshēng). Previous interpretations were more ambiguous in interpreting the meaning of the term niàn (念). Shandao was the first to define these as "orally holding Amitāyus's name" (口稱彌陀名號; kǒuchēng Mítuó mínghào). Shandao even applies this interpretation in cases where a text does not clearly state that nian refers to oral repetition.
3. All nine levels of rebirth in the Pure Land discussed by the Contemplation Sutra were accomplished by ordinary people not advanced āryas (noble sages). The lowest level includes even people who have committed the worst of evils but have converted and said the nianfo wishing to be reborn in the Pure Land.
4. Rebirth in the Pure Land comes primarily through Amitabha Buddha's vow rather than one's own efforts. Shandao writes that the vows are "the direct and empowering cause" (增上緣; zēngshàng yuàn) of rebirth in the Pure Land. Most previous authors (except Tanluan) had held that Amitabha merely creates the Pure Land, but that it is our own deeds and merit that takes us there.

=== The causes of birth in the Pure Land ===
According to Shandao, birth in the Pure Land arises from an external condition and from internal conditions. The external condition is the other-power of Amitabha Buddha and the internal conditions are the triple mind of faith (三心) and the right Pure Land practices which include nianfo recitation and Buddha contemplation.

Shandao's Pure Land thought is based on the theory of the vow-power of Amitabha's Original Vow (本願), which had previously been discussed by masters like Tanluan and Daochuo. According to this view, all ordinary beings, good or bad, can attain birth in the Pure Land through Amitabha Buddha's power. This position different from that of previous masters like Jizang and Jingying Huiyuan. For Shandao, all the lotus grades of rebirth in the Contemplation Sutra refer to various grades of ordinary beings (pṛthagjana).

Even though they are all ordinary beings with many defilements, the karmic power (業力) of the Buddha can lead them to the Pure Land, as Shandao states:

The ability of ordinary people, both good and bad, to attain birth [in the Pure Land] happens for no other reason than being carried by the karmic power of the great vows of Amitabha Buddha as the dominant karmic condition.

=== The true mind and its three aspects ===
A key element of Shandao's Pure Land teaching is his emphasis on faith or trust, which he saw as being necessary for gaining birth in the Pure Land. Faith is explained by Shandao through the schema of the triple mind (三心), which indicate the faithful mental attitude (the "true mind") that is needed to attain rebirth in the Pure land. This is derived from a passage in the Sutra on the Visualization of Amitayus which states that beings who are born in the highest grade are "sentient beings who resolve to be born in that land, awaken the threefold mind and so are born there." The sutra goes on to explain that the three are: "first, a sincere mind; second, a deep mind; and third, a mind that seeks birth there by transferring one's merit. Those who have these three kinds of mind will certainly be born there." A similar concept of faith with three aspects is found in the Awakening of Faith.

In "Hymns in Praise of Birth" (往生礼讃; Wangsheng Lizan Ji), Shandao explains the triple mind which are required to attain birth in the Pure Land as follows:

First, sincere mind; worshiping that Buddha as the bodily act, praising and glorifying him as the verbal act, and concentrating on and contemplating him as the mental act - in performing those three kinds of acts, you are required to be sincere. Hence, this is called 'sincere mind.' Second, deep mind; this is the true faith which accepts that you are an ordinary person full of evil passions, possessed of few roots of good, subject to transmigration in the three worlds, and unable to escape from the 'burning house'; nevertheless, now you recognize the fact that Amitabha's Universal Primal Vow definitely ensures birth in the Pure Land of those who recite the Name even ten times or down to once. Since you do not entertain even a single thought of doubt, such a state of mind is called 'deep mind.' Third, making aspiration for birth through merit-transference; you aspire for birth through transferring all the roots of good towards it; hence, such a state of mind is called 'making an aspiration for birth through merit-transference.'Those who possess all the three minds unfailingly attain birth. If one of them is lacking, birth cannot be attained.

The two key elements of faith for Shandao are ultimately (1) an acceptance of our limited and defiled mind and (2) faith in the infinite compassionate power of the Buddha to save us. Furthermore, in his commentary to the Contemplation Sutra, he indicates that the true mind of faith includes an ethical commitment to avoid evil and do good:

There are two types of truly benefiting oneself: First, within the true mind one should prevent and discard all of the various evils of self and other, defiled lands, etc., and think 'Just as all the bodhisattvas prevent and discard all the various evils, so too will I'....One should necessarily discard non-good in the three types of action [bodily, verbal, mental ] within the mind of truth. Also when one does good, one should necessarily do it within the mind of truth.

However, Shandao is also clear that ethical action, no matter how good, will not lead to birth in the Pure land. Thus he warns against merely doing good outwardly, against pretentiously and "strenuously" working to do good. He calls this self-centered action, "good tainted with poison". As such, we must not have any faith on our good actions or other individual qualities, but on Amitabha's vow-power. For Shandao, anyone seeking Buddhahood must recognize that "one is an evil, ordinary being", and then when "one without doubt or hesitation gives oneself over to the power of the vows" one will definitely attain birth in the pure land.

=== Main practices ===
Shandao discusses Pure Land practice in various ways. His most general schema is one which divides practices into primary practices (zhengxing) and miscellaneous practices (zaxing). For Shandao, the primary Pure Land practices are:

1. Single-minded recitation of the Pure Land sutras
2. Single-minded meditation and visualization of Amitabha and the Pure Land
3. Worshiping and bowing to Amitabha exclusively
4. Exclusively recite Amitabha's name
5. Singing praises and making offerings to Amitabha

Shandao further highlights the importance of nianfo, the oral recitation of Buddha's name (南無阿彌陀佛; Nāmó Āmítuófó; "Homage to Amitabha Buddha"), by classifying it as the "primary deed" (zhengye), while calling the other four practices "auxiliary" (zhuye). This indicates that for him, oral recitation of Amitabha's name is the most important practice out of the five.

As Shandao writes:

If sentient beings are mindful of the Buddha and chant his name, then he eliminates the sins which they have been accumulating for a long time. Also, when their lives are about to end, the Buddha, together with his attendant bodhisattvas, appear and they welcome them [into the Pure Land]. They will never again be perverted by the various forms of sinful karma [after being born in the Pure Land]. Therefore, we call this the "Dominant Factor". Even though some other practices may be wholesome, if we compare them with the practice of chanting the name of Buddha Amitabha, the latter is, beyond all comparison, the best.

Miscellaneous practices on the other hand include all other practices, including keeping Buddhist precepts, doing meritorious acts, other forms of Buddhist meditation and so forth. According to Shandao, we may still attain rebirth in the Pure Land by dedicating the merit of these miscellaneous practices to birth in the Pure Land, but they are not the main practices.

=== Meditation and recitation ===
In Shandao's Commentary to the Contemplation Sutra (simplified Chinese: 观无量寿经疏; traditional Chinese: 觀無量壽經疏; pinyin: Guān wú liàng shòu jing shū; Wade–Giles: Kuan wu-liang-shu ching-shu), he writes that the essential intent of the sutra is both the meditative contemplation of the Buddha (guanfo) and the recollection of the Buddha (nianfo). He divides the sutra's main teaching section into two parts: the meditative and the non-meditative teachings, terms which he borrows from Jingying Huiyuan. However, unlike Huiyuan (who argued the meditative teachings included all sixteen contemplations taught in the sutra), Shandao argues that only the first thirteen contemplations are part of the meditative teaching, while the other three (focusing on the nine grades of rebirth in the pure land) are non-meditative and based on nianfo.

While Shandao's teaching focuses on the vocal nianfo (such as reciting the phrase "Namo Amitabha Buddha"), he also practiced and taught meditative nianfo in his writings, as did previous Pure Land figures like Tanluan and Daochuo. This was a practice generally done in a retreat setting lasting for several days in which one practiced recitation and meditation on Amitabha's bodily form intensively to achieve a state of samadhi. It was based on sutras like the Pratyutpannasamādhi, and the Guānfó sānmèi hăi jīng (Sūtra on the Ocean Samādhi of Buddha contemplation). Two inscriptions from shortly after Shandao's death indicate that he was known for his meditative prowess, since they call him "Meditation (Chan) master Shandao" and "Great Precept Master Shandao who has realized samadhi".

However, Shandao clearly sees the vocal nianfo as the best practice since it is accessible to all, as he writes in his Verses in Praise for Rebirth in the Pure Land:

Because sentient beings are burdened with weighty obstacles: their conscious worlds are limited; their minds are coarse; their senses are disturbed and their spirits are frivolous. Thus, meditation is difficult to observe. Therefore, the Great Sage compassionately urged them to chant the name exclusively. Precisely because chanting the name is easy, they can do so continuously and attain birth in the Pure Land.

In commenting on the Contemplation Sutra, after admitting that the sutra teaches both meditation and recitation, Shandao writes: "if we see [the sutra] from the standpoint of the intention of the essential vow of Buddha Amitabha, we realize that the purpose of the text is to make all sentient beings single-heartedly and exclusively chant the name of Buddha Amitabha." Furthermore, in commenting on the last lines of the sutra, in which Shakyamuni says to Ananda "You must uphold these words. To uphold them is to uphold the name of Amida Buddha," Shandao writes:

Although this sutra has carefully expounded the thirteen visualizations of the Pure Land and the nine levels of practice proper for the nine levels of beings, its most important explanation is reserved for the last lines of this sutra. It concerns the very heart of Amida Buddha's vow; that one must recite the name, the nianfo. (T. 365, 12:346b)

Thus, Shandao clearly elevates the vocal nianfo as the supreme practice over all others. According to Atone, Shandao's promotion of the chanting of nianfo as a practice that was superior to meditation was a major innovation in the history of East Asian Buddhism.

Regarding the practical concerns, Shandao recommends vocal nianfo to all people alongside auxiliary practices like reciting the short Amitabha Sutra. Shandao also recommended extensive recitation. In his Liturgical Hymns, Shandao recommends that his disciples recite the Name and read the Amitabha Sutra "several tens of thousands of times." Likewise in the Method of Contemplation and the Five Conditions, Shandao suggests a daily practice of fifteen readings of the shorter sutra and 10,000 recitations of the Buddha's Name. He also says that those who can recite more, such as 30,000 to 100,000 times, will be reborn in the highest rebirth grade of the Pure Land. In the postface to the commentary to the Contemplation Sutra, Shandao reports that he would recite the Name up to 30,000 times daily.

=== Other practices ===
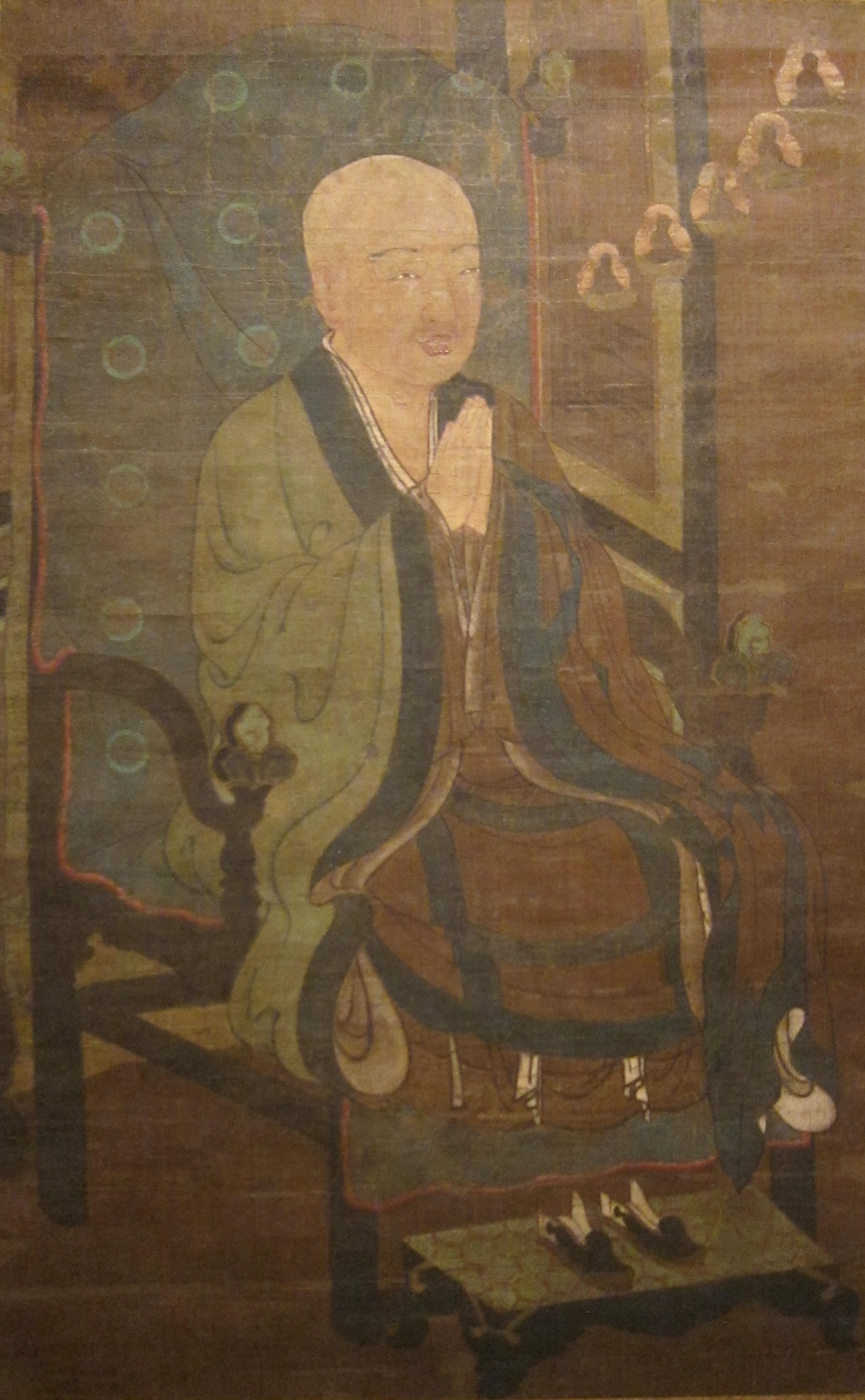
Portrait of Shandao reciting Amitabha's name, Nanbokuchō period, 14th century, Japan, hanging scroll; ink, color and gold on silk, private collection

In Hymns in Praise of Birth, Shandao also taught the "Five Mindful Practices" and "Four Modes of [Pure Land Buddhist] Practice" (四修). The Five Mindful Practices, which Shandao quotes directly from Vasubandhu's "Discourse on the Pure Land" (浄土論; Jìngtǔ lùn') are: (1) worship Amitabha reverentially with a concentrated mind and make offerings; (2) praise the glory of Amitabha and his Pure Land; (3) concentrate, contemplate and think of Amitabha and the noble beings of the Pure Land; (4) aspire to be born in the Pure Land with a sincere heart; and (5) concentrate on and rejoice in your good deeds and the good deeds done by all beings and dedicate the merit of all good deeds towards birth in the Pure Land.

The Four Modes of Practice described by Shandao are the following:

1. Reverential practice: to worship the Buddha and bodhisattvas.
2. Exclusive practice: to exclusively focus on reciting the Buddha's name, to contemplate, be mindful of and worship the Buddha Amitabha exclusively.
3. Uninterrupted practice: to revere, worship, recite, praise, contemplate and aspire for birth in the pure land with concentration and without interruption. If negative thoughts take you astray, practice repentance without delay.
4. "Perform these acts continuously with determination until the end of your life; this is a long term practice."

Aside from nianfo, Shandao often emphasized other textual, meditative and ritual practices. Shandao's tract, "The Meritorious Dharma Gate of the Samādhi Involving Contemplation of the Ocean-like Marks of the Buddha Amitābha" (阿彌陀佛相海三昧功德法門; Āmítuófó xiāng hǎi sānmèi gōngdé fǎmén) emphasizes samādhi and ritual practice. Also, Shandao's direct disciples, such as Huaigan, were recorded as having emphasized meditation practices. Similarly, Shandao's Fǎshì Zàn (法事讚) focuses on the ritual recitation of the Amitabha Sutra in front of an altar with a statue of the Buddha. Shandao also practiced copying the Pure Land sutras. The Xu Gaoseng zhuan contains a biography of Shandao which states that "after he entered the capital, he preached his teaching extensively. He transcribed the Amituo jing (Amitabha Sutra) many tens of thousands of times."

In numerous passages, Shandao also emphasizes the practice of repentance as an important practice which can be joined with the recitation of nianfo and can remove all our evil karma. In addition, Shandao's expositions on the Pure Land are also rooted in classic Madhyamika and Yogacara principles, indicating his deep study of the Buddhist philosophical tradition. Shandao was also noted to be a practitioner who engaged in ascetic practices such as never lying down to sleep and constantly practicing samādhi and ritual activity, and he is said to have advised other people to do the same.

=== The Pure Land ===
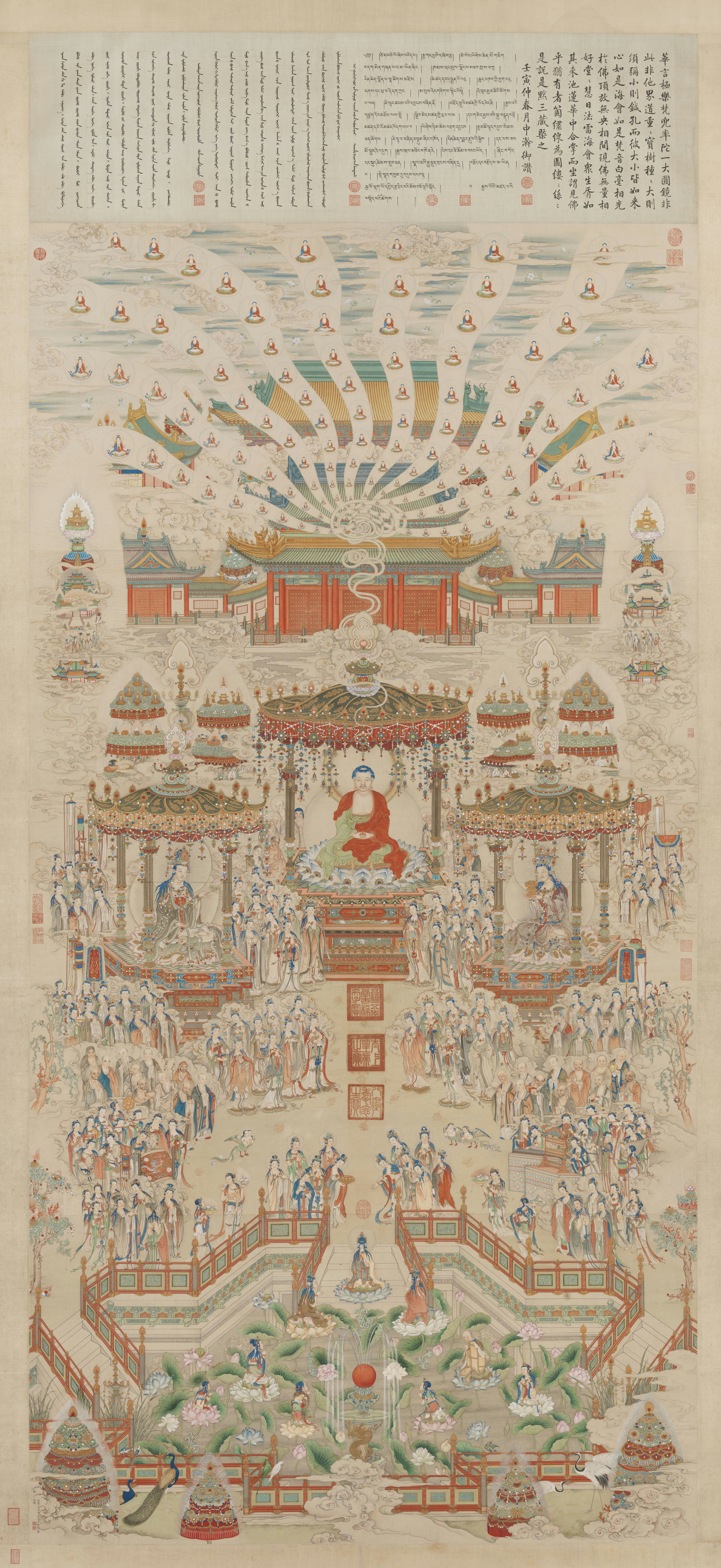
A Chinese painting of the Pure Land

Shandao also defended the view that Amitabha was perceived as a reward-body Buddha (samboghakaya) and that Sukhavati was seen as a reward-land by beings who were reborn there. He thus went against a common idea in China at the time which saw Amitabha and his Pure Land as a transformation body (nirmanakaya) with limited lifespan. This position is found in his commentary to the Contemplation Sutra, in which he states that Sukhavati "is a Reward [land] and not a Transformed [land]. How is this known? It is as explained in the Mahayanabhisamaya sutra* [大乘同性經 Dàchéng Tóngxìng Jīng, T.673], Sukhavati in the Western Quarter and Buddha Amitabha are [respectively] Reward Buddha and Reward land."

Shandao was also adamant that even though this Pure Land was a glorious reward land, it was not only accessible to Buddhas and bodhisattvas (a common feature of samboghakaya buddhafields in some Mahayana sources), but was actually accessible to all beings. This is because the power of Amitabha's vows can carry all beings to the Pure Land:

If we discuss the hindrances of the defilements of the sentient beings, It is very difficult to wish to be born in the Pure Land. [However], if we rely completely on the power of the essential vow of Amitabha Buddha, [the reliance] becomes a powerful condition by which all five vehicles are, with equanimity, permitted to enter the Pure Land.

Thus, the power of Amitabha Buddha is the main cause for birth. Indeed, Shandao writes that all ordinary worldly people (prthagjanas) "depend upon the karma power of the great vow of Buddha Amitabha, which they regard as the essential condition [for their birth]".

=== The nine grades of rebirth ===
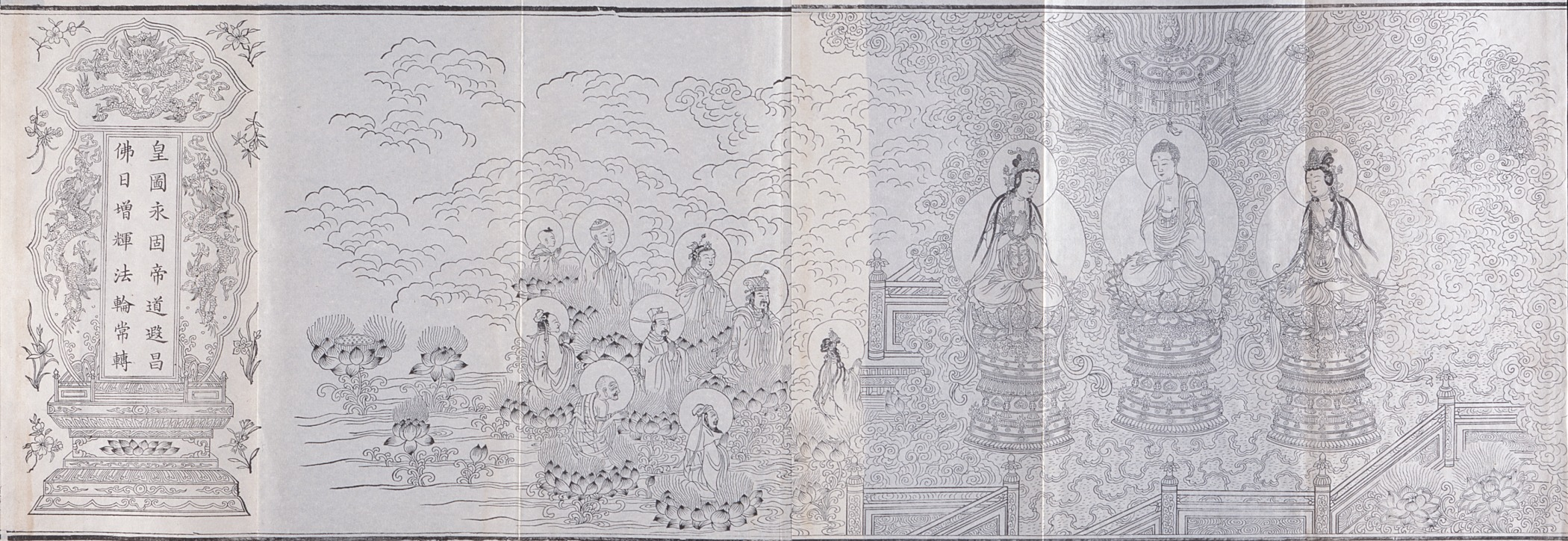
Frontispiece of the Rules for Repenting and Rebirth in the Pure Land (Wangsheng Jingtu Chanyuan Yikuei), depicting beings being born in lotus blossoms

Shandao also provides an innovative interpretation of the nine grades of rebirth into the Pure Land found in the Contemplation Sutra. For Shandao, all of these grades are for different types of ordinary worldly beings (pṛthagjana). This contrasts with previous authors like Jingying Huiyuan and Zhiyi who had argued that higher levels were for bodhisattvas on the stages and the lower levels were for ordinary people.

Shandao also held that all types of ordinary people could easily be born in the Pure Land by reciting the Buddha's name. Previous authors like Jizang had argued that to even be born in the lowest grades one needed to have some spiritual attainment in practicing Mahayana Buddhism. Shandao even argues that even those who have committed the "five grave deeds" (which includes killing one's parents, injuring a Buddha, etc) can attain the Pure Land through the Buddha's power.

Shandao explanation of these grades can be outlined as follows:

1. The highest of the high grades: This is attained by those who have the triple mind of faith, avoid killing, recite the Mahayana vaipulya sutras, practice six kinds of mindfulness and transfer their merit to others.
2. The middle high grade: This is attained by those understand the meaning of the Mahayana vaipulya sutras and avoid slandering the Mahayana.
3. The lowest high grade: This is attained by those who understand the principle of dependent arising and avoid slandering the Mahayana.
4. The highest middle grade: This is attained by those who keep the five precepts and eight precepts and do not commit the five great evils: killing one's father or mother (1, 2), killing an arhat or a Buddha (3, 4) or causing a schism in the sangha (5).
5. The middle of the middle grades: This is attained by those who observe the eight precepts, or the monastic precepts.
6. The lowest middle grade: This is attained by those who are good to their parents and observe moral principles and who at the time of death, meet a virtuous teacher who teaches them about the pure land.
7. The highest lower grade: This is attained by those who have committed evil acts but do not slander the Mahayana and at the time of death say the name of Buddha Amitabha.
8. The middle low grade: This is attained by those who meet a virtuous teacher who teaches them about the pure land at the end of their lives, even though they have violated the five precepts and stolen from the sangha.
9. The lowest of the low grades: This is attained by those who committed the five great evils along with other bad acts but meet a good teacher who teaches them about the pure land and then they say the nianfo.

=== Parable of the White Path ===
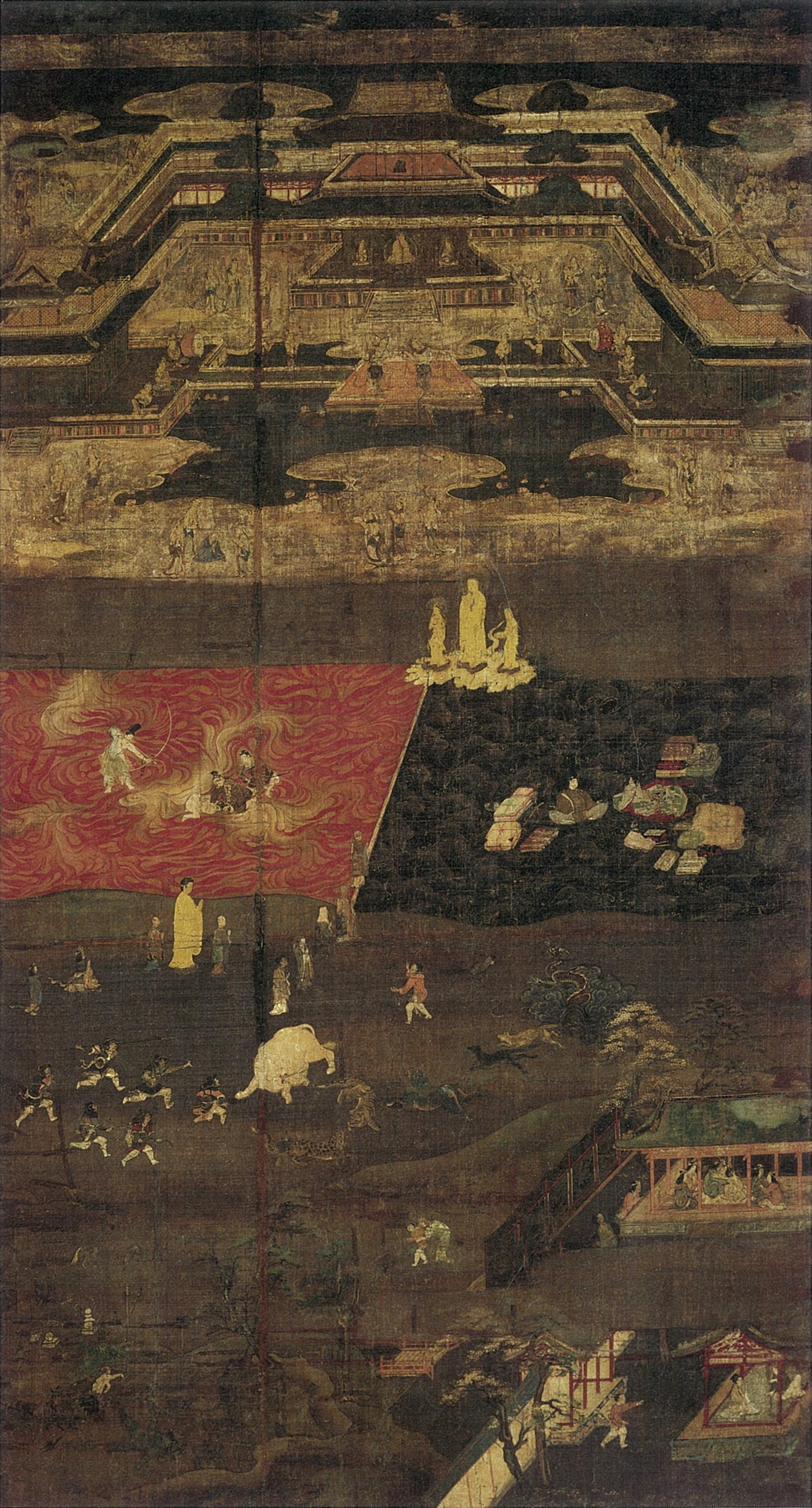
A 13th century depiction of the Parable of the White Path to the Pure Land of Amida (Amitābha) between Two Rivers of Worldly Vice, Kosetsu Museum of Art

In his Commentary on the Amitāyurdhyāna Sūtra, Shandao described the human condition and the Pure Land path using a now famous parable known as the "Parable of the Two Rivers and White Path" (二河白道). Shandao describes a man harried by bandits and wild beasts (symbolizing the five aggregates and the eighteen dhatus) who comes to a river bank. Spanning a river is a narrow, white path, while on one side the river is made of churning water (symbolizing desire and greed), and the other fire (aversion, hatred). Then, the man hears a voice calling from the other side of the river, assuring him that if he crosses the path, he will be safe. The voice says: "With singleness of mind and right attention go forward at once; I will protect you!" The voice on the other side of the river is said to be Amitabha Buddha, guiding them across the narrow white path (symbolyzing the pure faithful aspiration to be reborn in the pure land), from samsara to the Pure Land (the other shore).

=== Difficulty of attaining rebirth ===
According to Charles Jones, Shandao conceived of it to be possible for one to fail to be born "at the final moment ... if impure persons defiled the ritual space and allowed demonic beings to invade." Some sources may indicate this possibility. In one text, "The Meritorious Dharma Gate of the Samādhi Involving Contemplation of the Ocean-like Marks of the Buddha Amitābha" (阿彌陀佛相海三昧功德法門; Ēmítuófó xiāng hǎi sānmèi gōngdé fǎmén), Shandao describes a specific set of ritual protocols and practices for helping dying Buddhist devotees achieve successful deliverance from “evil destinies” and procure successful rebirth in the Pure Land.

Another text called "Correct Mindfulness for Rebirth at the Moment of Death" (臨終往生正念文; Línzhōng wǎngshēng zhèngniàn wén), often attributed to Shandao, presents a nuanced understanding of the rebirth process and details many dangers that can hinder the dying aspirant's rebirth in the Pure Land. However, according to Dao Duan Liangxiu, this text has long been considered by scholars to have been a later composition that began to circulate widely in the Song dynasty, and to be a false attribution.

There are also various hagiographical records concerning Shandao which reflect concerns regarding more complicated requirements for rebirth in the Pure Land, including but not limited to recitation of Amitābha's name on one's deathbed specifically.

At the same time, Shandao and his disciple Huaigan emphasised that all ordinary beings, no matter their level of attainment, are capable of birth by the power of the Buddha's vows, and that "even the worst evil-doer could say the name of the Buddha and gain immediate access to a glittering Pure Land immediately after death." In particular that utterance is interpreted by Shandao as calling "Amitābha Buddha for seven days or even for one day for as little as ten oral invocations or even one oral calling or one contemplation". As such, for Shandao, birth in the Pure Land was not for just superior practitioners, but for the lowest kinds of people who have performed "unwholesome acts: the Five Heinous Deeds, the ten evils, and everything that is not good."

Indeed, Shandao interprets the key passage on the 18th vow in the Infinite Life Sutra as meaning that anyone who, trusting in the Buddha, recites his name ten times, will achieve birth in the Pure Land. Shandao writes this even though the Infinite Life Sutra states that the pure land excludes those who have committed the five heinous acts (killing (1) one's father, (2) one's mother, (3) an arhat, (4) harming a Buddha's body, (5) causing a schism in the Buddhist community). According to Shandao, this is because the Buddha's infinite compassion and power will save all beings and take them to the Pure Land, even those who have committed the worst offenses. As such, he does not take this exclusionary passage literally.

== Works ==
Shandao wrote several texts, including Mahayana commentaries.

=== Main works ===
Shandao's main extant works are called the "five works in nine fascicles", which are:

- The Commentary on the Contemplation Sūtra (Chinese: 觀無量壽經疏; pinyin: Guān wúliàngshòu jīng shū; Japanese pronunciation: Kanmuryōju kyō sho). Taishō no. 1753, in four fascicles. This is his magnum opus, which contains Shandao's main Pure Land worldview.
- Verses in Praise for Rebirth in the Pure Land (Chinese: 往生禮讚偈; pinyin: Wǎngshēng lǐ zànjié; Japanese pronunciation: Ōjō rai sange, Taishō no. 1980, in one fascicle). An English translation by Hisao Inagaki (2002) is titled Liturgy for Birth . This text discusses Pure Land practice more generally, as well as liturgical practice. It includes six hymns of praise for chanting at six periods of a day-night cycle.
- Dharma Gate of Contemplative Recollection (Guānniàn fǎmén, Taishō no. 1959, in one fascicle); Full title: The Dharma Gate of the Merits of the Ocean-like Samādhi of the Contemplation of the Marks of Amitābha Buddha (Chinese: 觀念阿彌陀佛相海三昧功德法門; pinyin: Guānniàn āmítuó fó xiāng hǎisānmèi gōngdé fǎmén; Japanese pronunciation: Kannen amida butsu sō kai sammai kudoku hōmen). This text explains how to meditate on the various Buddha contemplations (guanfo samadhi) found in the Contemplation Sutra and in the Pratyutpannasamadhi sutra, as well as ritual preparations which are performed before meditation. There is an English translation by Inagaki titled The Method of Contemplation of Amida.
- Praise of Dharma Services (Chinese: 法事讚; pinyin: Fǎshì Zàn; Japanese pronunciation: Hōji San); Full title: Liturgy for the Rite of Desiring Birth in the Pure Land Through Chanting Sutras and Circumambulation. Taishō no. 1979, in two fascicles. This explains the performance of a ritual for reciting the Amitabha sutra (along with confession, recitation of hymns and the name of the Buddha). The ritual emphasizes confession of past bad deeds.
- Praise of Pratyutpanna (Chinese: 般舟讚; pinyin: Pánzhōu Zàn; Japanese pronunciation: Hanjū San, Taishō no. 1981, in one fascicle); Full title: Hymns Praising Birth in the Pure Land Through the Practice of Pratyupanna-Samadhi on the Basis of the Meditation Sutra and other Sutras. This is another ritual manual which relies on the Pratyutpanna Samādhi Sūtra.

Another work, recently rediscovered is:

- Hymn for the Ceremony of the Western Land (Hsi-fang li tsang-wen, T. 2875): A hymn cited by Fazhao, copies of which were rediscovered by modern scholars at Dunhuang, and at another site near Toyuk.

=== Other related works ===
There are other works attributed to Shandao. Scholars are somewhat divided on these works or the works may be lost / fragmentary. These other possible works of Shandao include:

- There are three lost works are mentioned in other Chinese sources: The Meaning of Amitabha (Mitou-yi), The Mahayana Bodhisattva Dharma (Dacheng Pusa Fa) and Essay about Techniques for Converting People to the Western Paradise.
- Nianfo-jing (Mirror of Nianfo, T. 1966), the colophon of this text mentions two authors, Shandao and Tao-ching. Tao-ching's work seems to quote from a lost work of Shandao, the Nianfo-chi. This is unlikely to be by Shandao since it quotes his student Huaigan's work and is from a later period.
- Instructions for Maintaining Right Mindfulness at the Moment of Death (Lin Zhengnian Jue) which is found in Zongxiao's Song era compilation Collected Texts of the Land of Bliss (Lebang Wenlei). A similar work is found in Wang Rixiu's Expanded Pure Land Documents of Longshu. There is no scholarly consensus on the source of this text, which has a complex and likely composite history. According to Jimmy Yu, this text likely dates "from the end of Tang era or the period of the Five Dynasties (907-960)" and it is associated with the Nianfo-jing tradition.

== Interpretations of Shandao's thought ==
There are different interpretations of the Pure Land thought of Shandao among religious and secular scholars. Scholarly interpretations of Shandao have often been influenced by the understandings of Japanese Pure Land Buddhism. One example of this Japanese Pure Land influenced interpretation can be found in Ryōsetsu Fujiwara's The Way to Nirvana: The Concept of the Nembutsu in Shan-tao's Pure Land Buddhism. According to Fujiwara, Shandao's most mature work is his commentary to the Contemplation sutra (not all scholars agree on this). Fujiwara argues that by Shandao's mature phase, he only advocated vocal recitation of the nianfo (jp. nembutsu). Other practices taught in other works (the Buddha contemplation or visualization meditations) are labeled as “primitive nembutsu" by Fujiwara, who argues that they were only practiced by Shandao as an expression of gratitude to the Buddha (which is a specifically Jōdo Shinshū idea).

However, not all scholars agree with the view that Shandao held vocal recitation as superior to all other forms of buddha recollection. Julian Pas’ Visions of Sukāhavatī argues for the opposite thesis, that Shandao's main method of practice was the contemplative visualizations of the Contemplation Sutra and that vocal recitation was a minor element of his teaching used as a skillful means for certain laypeople. Pas argues that Shandao wrote extensively on samādhi practices such as visualization and meditation indicating that these practices were central to his teaching.

Defenders of the Japanese approach, such as Jérôme Ducor, have suggested that writers such as Pas have misrepresented the relevant Japanese sources, and that Shandao's scheme clearly delineates between "meditation sūtras" such as the Pratyutpanna Sūtra from sūtras that teach "birth in the Pure Land," among which are included the Infinite Life Sūtra, the Amitābha Sūtra, and the Amitāyurdhyāna Sūtra. Ducor also notes how Shandao's Commentary on the Amitāyurdhyāna Sūtra makes clear the distinction between birth in the Pure Land by faith and nianfo/nembutsu, which he regards as definitive and a "non-requested" teaching, from the meditative practices such as visualisation, which he regards as a skilful means and a teaching given only on request by Queen Vaidehī.

Other modern scholars present a more balanced view which see Shandao as teaching the importance of both vocal recitation and meditative visualization. For example, Kenneth Tanaka writes that for Shandao, the main intent of the Contemplation sutra is both meditative guanfo and nianfo. According to Tanaka, "nianfo" for Shandao also "included a wide range of practices such as "recollection" (i), "listening" (wen), and "oral recitation'' (ch'eng)." This is as opposed to earlier figures like Jingying Huiyuan who wrote that the main intent of the Contemplation Sutra was just meditative visualization (guan).

Shandao's commentary itself states that the doctrinal essence of the Contemplation sutra is both nianfo and guanfo: "I consider both the samadhi of mediation on the Buddha and the samadhi of chanting the name of Buddha [Amitabha] to be the main characteristics of the Contemplation sutra." Thus according to Atone, Shandao presented both methods with impartiality in his commentary, while also holding that recitation of the name was the primary and most important practice overall.

Likewise, Jérôme Ducor writes that while Shandao affirmed the visualizations of the Contemplation Sutra as skillful means taught on Vaidehi's request, he saw vocal nianfo as easier and more accessible to all and as more important since it was taught without prompting.

== Influence ==
=== In China ===
Shandao had an influence on many later Chinese Buddhist figures who wrote on Pure Land Buddhism, including those later Chinese masters considered to be Pure Land patriarchs, like Fazhao and Wulong Shaokang, who was eventually considered to be a reincarnation of Shandao. Shandao's disciple, Huaigan (d. 699) became an influential author after his composition of "Treatise explaining a number of doubts about Pure Land" (釋淨土群疑論; Shì jìngtǔ qúnyí lùn, T.1960) which expanded on Shandao's Pure Land views.

The Song era Vinaya school author Zhanran Yuanzhao (1048-1116) was also influenced by Shandao's commentary on the Contemplation sutra and draws on it in his own commentary on this sutra. Another Song dynasty figure who draws on Shandao is Jiedu, who defends Shandao in his Refutation of New Criticisms (Fu Xin Lun). Shandao's Pure Land works were influential on various Tiantai authors who wrote on Pure Land practice, and his influence on Tiantai Pure land was only second to Zhiyi's.

Shandao was also praised by later figures as well, including Yunqi Zhuhong in his Record of Rebirth (Wangsheng Zhuan) who calls Shandao “a figure rivaling Avalokiteshvara or Samantabhadra if not Amitābha himself.” Shandao is praised as a Pure Land patriarch in later works such as Treasury of the Lotus School (Lianzong Baojian) by Pudu, Collected Directions for Pure Land Practice (Jingtu Zhigui Ji) by Dayou in the Ming dynasty, Daoyan's Concise Record of the Pure Land, and Qing scholar Zhaoying's Painful Admonitions for Pure Practice (Jingye Tongce).

While the ideas of Shandao remained influential in the works of others, his main works had been lost in China after the Tang dynasty. After Yang Renshan established the Jinling Sutra Press with the assistance of Nanjō Bun'yū, Shandao's five key works were disseminated once again in China. These works also influenced the thought of Shi Yinguang (1862–1940), the most influential Pure Land master of modern China.1862–1940). Yinguang praised Shandao as an "emanation of Amitabha Buddha" in his writings, seeing the path taught by Shandao as the fundamental lineage of the Pure Land school.

More recently, Dharma Master Huijing (1950-) and Dharma Master Jingzong (1966-, Abbot of Hongyuan Monastery) have founded a new lineage focused on the Pure land teachings of Shandao, which calls itself the "Shandao lineage".

=== Role in Japanese Traditions ===
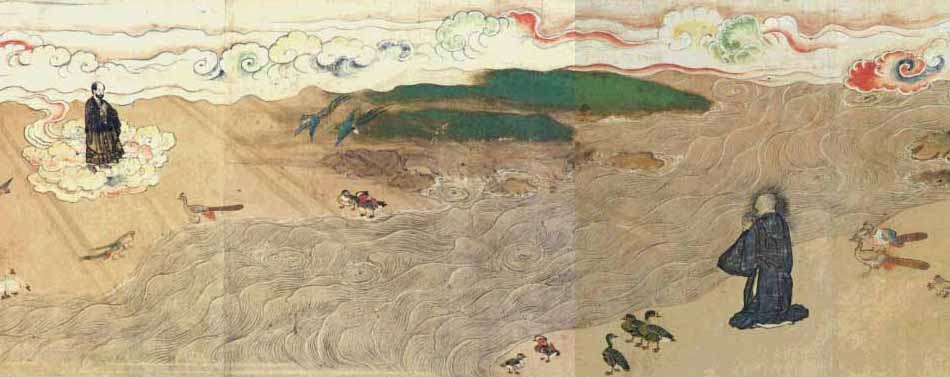
An illustration of Hōnen dreaming of Shandao

In Japanese Pure Land traditions, such as Jōdo-shū and Jōdo Shinshū, Shandao is traditionally seen as the most important Chinese Pure Land commentator and patriarch. He is also considered an emanation of Amitabha Buddha himself. Shandao is seen in these traditions as having advocated for the exclusivity of the nianfo/nembutsu as a practice in order to seek salvation through Amitābha, meaning that reciting the name of Amitābha Buddha was all that was needed.

== See also ==
- Kyŏnghŭng - contemporary Korean commentator on Pure Land sutras
- Huaigan - Shandao's disciple
- Fazhao - called "the latter day Shandao"
- Cimin Huiri
- Shaokang
- Tanluan
- Buddhism in China

== Bibliography ==
- Atone, Joji (1988). Shan-tao: His Life and Thought (PhD). University of Wisconsin, Madison.
- Conway, Micheal (2018). "Ethics in Pure Land School". In Cozort; Shields (eds.). The Oxford Handbook of Buddhist Ethics. Oxford University Press.
- Ducor, Jérôme (1999-06-30). "Shandao and Hōnen. Apropos of Julian F. Pas's book Visions of Sukhāvatī". Journal of the International Association of Buddhist Studies. 22 (1): 251–252. ISSN 0193-600X.
- Fujiwara, Ryosetsu (1974). The Way to Nirvana: The Concept of the Nembutsu in Shan-Tao's Pure Land Buddhism. The Kyoiku Shincho Sha Co.
- Jones, Charles B. (2019). Chinese Pure Land Buddhism: Understanding a Tradition of Practice. Honolulu: University of Hawaii Press. ISBN 9780824881016.
- Shan-tao's Exposition of the Method of Contemplation on Amida Buddha, part 1 (PDF). Third. Translated by Inagaki, Hisao. Pacific World. 1999. pp. 77–89. Archived from the original (PDF) on 7 July 2010.
- Shan-tao's Exposition of the Method of Contemplation on Amida Buddha, part 2 (PDF). Third. Translated by Inagaki, Hisao. Pacific World. 2000. pp. 207–228. Archived from the original (PDF) on 7 July 2010.
- Shan-tao's Exposition of the Method of Contemplation on Amida Buddha part 3 (PDF). Third. Translated by Inagaki, Hisao. Pacific World. 2001. pp. 277–288. Archived from the original (PDF) on 7 July 2010.
- Pas, Julian F. (1995). Visions of Sukhavati: Shan-Tao's Commentary on the Kuan Wu-liang- Shou-Fo Ching. Albany: State University of New York Press. ISBN 0-7914-2520-7. OCLC 42854968.
- Marchman, Kendall R. (2015). Huaigan and the Growth of Pure Land Buddhism During the Tang Era (PhD).
- Sheng, Kai (Jun 15, 2020). A History of Chinese Buddhist Faith and Life. BRILL.
- Tanaka, Kenneth K. (1990). The Dawn of Chinese Pure Land Buddhist Doctrine: Ching-ying Hui-yüanʼs Commentary on the Visualization Sutra. Albany: State University of New York Press.
