= Xuanzhong Temple =

Buddhist temple in Jiaocheng County, Shanxi, China

- 玄中寺
- Location within Shanxi Location within China

Religion
- Affiliation: Buddhism
- Sect: Pure Land Buddhism

Location
- Location: Jiaocheng County, Shanxi
- Country: China
- Coordinates: 37°34′15″N 112°05′30″E

Architecture
- Style: Chinese architecture
- Established: 472

Xuanzhong Temple (Chinese: 玄中寺; pinyin: Xuánzhōng Sì) is a Buddhist temple located in Jiaocheng County, Shanxi, China. After Ennin introduced Pure Land Buddhism to Japan, Xuanzhong Temple is regard as one of the cradles of Pure Land Buddhism in both Chinese Buddhism and Japanese Buddhism.

== History ==
=== Northern Wei ===
Xuanzhong Temple was built in the 470s, in the Northern Wei dynasty (386–534), the construction took four years, and lasted from 472 to 476. Tan-luan, founder of Pure Land Buddhism, settled at Xuanzhong Temple in his declining years, where he taught Pure Land school for many years, and attracted large numbers of practitioners.

=== Sui dynasty ===
In 619, namely the 5th year of Daye period in the Sui dynasty (581–618), Daochuo resided in Xuanzhong Temple and publicized Buddhism until his death in 645.

=== Tang dynasty ===
In 635, in the Zhenguan era of the Tang dynasty (618–907), Emperor Taizong visited Xuanzhong Temple, he gave many priceless treasures to the temple and honored the name "Shibi Yongning Temple" (石壁永宁寺). In 812, Emperor Xianzong named it "Longshan Shibi Yongning Temple" (龙山石壁永宁寺).

=== Song dynasty ===
In 1090, in the reign of Emperor Zhezong in the Song dynasty (960–1127), a fire destroyed most of its buildings. The monk Daozhen (道珍) reconstructed the temple.

=== Jin dynasty ===
In 1186, in the reign of Emperor Shizong in the Jin dynasty (1115–1234), the temple was demolished in a fire. Monk Yuanzhao (元钊) rebuilt it.

=== Yuan dynasty ===
In 1238, the Emperor Taizong of the Yuan dynasty (1271–1368) changed its name to "Longshan Huguo Yongning Shifang Daxuanzhong Chan Temple" (龙山护国永宁十方大玄中禅寺), which known simply as "Xuanzhong Temple". Under the support of the imperial court, abbot Huixin (惠信) restored the temple and the temple had reached unprecedented heyday.

=== Qing dynasty ===
During the Tongzhi and Guangxu periods (1862–1908) of the Qing dynasty (1644–1911), Xuanzhong Temple became dilapidated for neglect.

=== People's Republic of China ===
The local government began to rebuild the temple since 1954; only the Hall of Four Heavenly Kings preserves the original building of the Ming dynasty (1368–1644). In 1983, Xuanzhong Temple was designated as a National Key Buddhist Temple in Han Chinese Area by the State Council of China. In November 2012, Xuanzhong Temple was categorized as an AAAA level tourist site by the China National Tourism Administration.

== Architecture ==
Xuanzhong Temple is built along the up and down of mountains and divided into the central, east and west routes. The entire temple faces south with the Hall of Four Heavenly Kings, Mahavira Hall, Hall of Seven-Buddha and Hall of Thousand-Buddha.

=== Hall of Four Heavenly Kings ===
The Hall of Four Heavenly Kings was built in 1605, in the late Ming dynasty (1368–1644), which is the oldest building in Xuanzhong Temple. The statues of Four Heavenly Kings are enshrined in the hall.

=== Mahavira Hall ===
The Mahavira Hall is the main hall in the temple. It is 25 metres (82 ft) long and 20 metres (66 ft) wide. In the middle of the hall enshrine the Maitreya Buddha, which is the most feature of Xuanzhong Temple. On the walls are paintings of the Sixteen Arhats.

=== Hall of Guru ===
The paintings of Tan-luan, Daochuo and Shandao is enshrined in the Hall of Guru, which were presented by the Japanese monk Sugawara Ekei (菅原惠庆) in September 1957.

=== Hall of Seven-Buddha ===
The Hall of Seven-Buddha is mainly for enshrining the statues of Seven-Buddha, they are Vipassī Buddha, Sikhī Buddha, Vessabhū Buddha, Krakucchanda, Koṇāgamana Buddha, Kassapa Buddha and Sakyamuni.

=== Pagoda ===
The quadrilateral-shaped pagoda stands at a height of about 2.31 metres (7 ft 7 in), built on a stone foundation.
