= Daochuo =

Chinese Pure Land Buddhist Patriarch

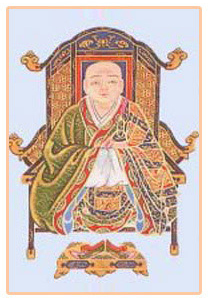
Traditional portrait of Patriarch Daochuo

Daochuo (Chinese: 道綽; pinyin: Dàochuò; Wade–Giles: Tao-ch'o; J. Dōshaku, c. 562–645) was an eminent Chinese Buddhist master of Pure Land Buddhism. He was also known as Chan Master Xihe (Meditation Master of the West River).

Daochuo was the first Pure Land teacher to discuss the framework of the two gates of Mahayana practice: the easy path of birth in the pure land of Amitabha, and the difficult path of sages. He taught that only the Pure Land path was truly effective. This was because the Pure Land path relied on the power of the Buddha's vows, while the path of sages relied on one's own effort over the course of thousands of eons of transmigration. Furthermore, Daochuo held that the world had entered into the Age of Dharma Decline, a time in which the path of self-effort was even less efficacious.

In Chinese Buddhist tradition, Daochuo is considered the second patriarch of Pure Land Buddhism, while In Jōdo Shinshū, he is considered the Fourth Patriarch.

== Life ==
Daochuo was born and raised in Bingzhou, Shanxi and entered the monkhood at an early age. He became a learned monk and a lecturer on the Mahāyāna Mahāparinirvāṇa Sūtra (Da banniepan jing 大般泥洹經). For some time, he studied under Huican (慧瓚, 536–607), a meditation master based at a monastery in Bingzhou.

In 609, Daochuo traveled to the monastery in Fenzhou, also in Shanxi, where the influential Pure Land master Tanluan had once lived. After reading Tanluan's epitaph, Daochuo experienced a profound change in his spiritual outlook and embraced the Pure Land path. Daochuo was so impressed by this inscription that he took up the pursuit of Pure Land Buddhism over all his previous studies, focusing on nianfo and daily recitation of the Infinite Life Sutra (Chinese: 無量壽經). He also dedicated himself to spreading the practice of reciting Amitābha's name, reportedly chanting it seventy thousand times daily. He encouraged others to engage in this practice and advised counting the recitations. Since prayer beads were difficult to obtain at the time, he recommended using beans or sesame seeds, moving one for each utterance of the Buddha's name.

Daochuo also studied the Buddhist Canon and the Pure Land Sutras extensively, and wrote a treatise on Pure Land practice based on his studies, the Ānlè jí, which is his only extant writing.

According to traditional biographical accounts, in either 628 or 629, on the eighth day of the fourth lunar month—the day commemorating the Buddha's birth—a large assembly of devoted followers gathered at Daochuo's monastery for the occasion. Suddenly, patriarch Tanluan (476–554) appeared in the sky, seated in a jeweled chariot, and proclaimed that Daochuo had secured his place in the Pure Land. However, before attaining rebirth there, he would still experience further karmic rewards in this lifetime. Immediately after this declaration, a vision of the Pure Land manifested before the assembly, allowing them to behold the Buddha and the bodhisattvas dwelling there.

== Teaching ==
Daochuo's main work is the Ānlè jí (Chinese: 安樂集, Anthology of the Land of Bliss, T.1958, in two scrolls). This work consists of twelve sections primarily comprising scriptural citations and exhortations encouraging rebirth in Amitābha's Pure Land of Sukhavati (here called Anleguo).

=== Dharma Decline ===
Daochuo was interested in Buddhist history. He relied on a chronology that divided our world's history into five 500-year periods after Śākyamuni Buddha's passing into nirvana. He mainly derived this schema from the Candragarbha-sūtra (Dàjí yuèzàng jīng 大集月藏經).

Based on various Mahayana sutras, Daochuo asserted that each of the five successive periods after the Buddha's passing was characterized by different modes of practice. The first era emphasized the cultivation of wisdom, followed by an age focused on meditation, then an era centered on the study and recitation of scriptures, followed by a period where merit-making through penitence and good deeds became the primary practice.

Finally, in the last stage, nearly all Dharma teachings would fade, leaving behind only monastic disputes. Believing that his own time corresponded to the era of the decline of the Dharma (mòfǎ 末法), Daochuo advocated recitation of Amitābha's name as the most effective practice, asserting that it could eliminate karmic transgressions accumulated across countless lifetimes and ensure rebirth in the Pure Land. According to Daochuo, the only truly effective path to liberation in this era of degeneration was the Pure Land path, which relied on Amitābha's compassionate Other Power to lead us to the pure land after death.

=== Two Paths ===
The Ānlè jí introduces a dual classification of the Buddha's teachings into two main “gates” or paths:

1. The Path of Sages (shèngdào, 聖道): Focused on teachings that guide practitioners toward achieving nirvāṇa through personal effort, i.e. “self-power” (zìlì 自力). He also called this as the “path of difficult practice” (nánxíng dào 難行道), while effective during the time of the Right Dharma (zhèngfǎ 正法), was now ineffective in our current era of Dharma decline.
2. The Way of Rebirth in the Pure Land (wǎngshēng jìngtǔ, 往生淨土) the chanting of Amitābha Buddha's name (nianfo), as a means to attain rebirth in the Pure Land. This path is the “path of easy practice” (yìxíng dào 易行道) which relies on the Buddha's “other-power” (tālì 他力).

Daochuo then argues that only the Pure Land path is truly effective:

The Path of Sages, one of the two approaches, is difficult to yield enlightenment in this age. Firstly, because we are far removed from the era of the Great Sage. Secondly, due to the profoundness of the Dharma-principle and the limitations of our comprehension. Hence, the Moon Store Sutra of the Great Compilation says: "In the Age of Dharma Decline, billions and billions of sentient beings will engage in the practice of the Way, yet not one will attain it." During the present Age of Dharma Decline, and in this unwholesome world of the Five Turbidities, only the path of the Pure Land provides a clear route to the gateway of enlightenment....Given these teachings of the scriptures, why not forsake the difficult and embrace the Easy Path?

This classification of Mahayana into two paths became a cornerstone for defending the practice of nianfo within Chinese Buddhism, especially within Pure Land Buddhism. Later Pure Land authors like Shandao widely adopted this idea, and it became a standard trope in Pure Land literature.

=== The superiority of the Pure Land path ===
As Michael Conway notes, while Daochuo uses the age of Dharma Decline as one reason for selecting the Pure Land path, he also argues that the path of sages is always more difficult than the Pure Land path, not matter the age. Indeed, Daochuo holds that the path of sages is fundamentally flawed and the Pure Land path is always inherently faster. This is mainly because the path of sages relies on one's own power and not on Amitabha's vow power. As such, Daochuo's argument about the superiority of the Pure Land path is not strictly limited to the age of Dharma Decline.

For Daochuo, what defines the Pure Land path is mainly one's intention to attain birth in the pure land by entrusting oneself to Amitabha Buddha's aid, while what defines the path of sages is the idea that one can attain Buddhahood through one's own effort in samsara. This also means that Daochuo's view of Pure Land practice is more inclusive than Tanluan's or Shandao's, since he makes room for a more varied group of practices (including giving rise to bodhicitta, ethical precepts and various other practices). As Conway writes, for Daochuo "it is not the content of the practice that is the deciding factor leading to birth in the pure land, but the working of the Buddha’s vows."

For example, in his discussion of contemplation, Daochuo states that since the phenomenal object of Pure Land meditation "is luminescent and pure", it is easier to meditate on Pure Land themes than elements of this world. He writes:

that [pure land] realm is one of non-retrogression and includes maintenance by other power. Therefore I say it is excellent. In this place, although one also endeavors to cultivate meditative concentration, one only has one’s own individual cause and lacks the support of other power. When the [good] karma [from meditative practice] is exhausted, one cannot avoid retrogressing, so I hold that [meditative practice] here is not equivalent.

This means that, even if the type of meditation is the same, the effect (non-retrogression) and cause (other-power) of the Pure Land practice are inherently superior and thus lead to much more rapid progress on the path. The issue of speed is important to Daochuo, and he argues that a key reason why the Pure Land method is excellent is that it allows one to attain the state of non-retrogression in one lifetime, as opposed to the thousands of kalpas needed in the path of sages:

The foolish, ordinary human beings of the current age are presently called ‘those whose thought of faith is as light as a feather,’ they are also said to be ‘provisionally named,’ and further referred to as the group of the unsettled and unaccomplished ordinary beings. They have not yet left the burning house [of the world of transmigration]. How can we know this? Based on the Pusa yingluo jing [菩薩瓔珞経], where it delineates the stages of practice of entry into enlightenment, it says, ‘Because of its very nature, this is called the path of difficult practice.’ Further, one cannot count the number of bodies one takes on in birth and death in even the span of one kalpa, let alone the burning suffering one would meaninglessly experience over the course of ten thousand kalpas. If one can clearly believe the Buddhist sutras and aspire for birth in the Pure Land, then in accord with the length of their lives, in just one lifetime, they can reach [the Pure Land] and attain nonretrogression, such that one attains the same virtues as one does through those ten thousand kalpas of practice. All Buddhists and others, why do you not weigh this [difference], abandon the difficult, and seek the easy?

In another, even more radical passage, Daochuo argues that because of the massive length of time required before attaining non-retrogression on the path of sages, one is likely to retrogress at some point beforehand. Furthermore, the fruits of one's practice are "upside down" (diandao 顛倒) since one is still deeply deluded, arrogant, and attached. All of this makes the fruits that one attains on the path of sages "false":

In this world, over the course of much time, one must completely practice giving, precepts, endurance, effort, meditation, and wisdom [the six pāramitās] for over ten thousand kalpas while one still is not freed from this burning house. One goes against nature and falls back on the path, so it is said that one expends extremely heavy virtues and the recompense that one attains is false.

=== Nianfo ===
Unlike later figures like Shandao, Daochuo’s discussion of the difficult and easy paths does not assign a specific practice exclusively to the easy path. Instead, he categorizes a wide range of practices, including both meditative and devotional ones, under the umbrella of "Pure Land practices," as long as they are done with the intention of birth in the pure land. This broad perspective has led later Shin Buddhist scholars to critique his approach as immature when compared to that of later figures who emphasize specific Pure Land practices, especially nianfo (the recitation of the Buddha's name). However, despite this inclusiveness, in some passages, Daochuo explicitly emphasizes that nianfo, especially the vocal recitation of Amitābha’s name, is the most effective practice for practitioners.

In chapter one of the Ānlè jí, Daochuo cites several sutras and argues that the recitation of the Buddha's name is the most appropriate practice for the current era since the Buddha's nirvana is long past:

Those who recognize and admit their transgressions, perform meritorious deeds, should chant the name of the Buddha. If one calls the name of Amitābha Buddha for one thought-moment, then the sins of eight billion kalpas of birth and death are completely removed. One thought-moment is already this way. How much more so [the one who] constantly practices thinking on the Buddha. [He] is the person who continuously recognizes and admits his transgressions. Further, if the passing of the Sage [Sakyamuni] is near [in time], then the former, the practice of meditation and the cultivation of transcendental wisdom, is the proper study and the latter is secondary. If the passing of the Sage is already far [in the past], then the latter, the calling of the name is proper, and the former is secondary.

Later, in chapter 3, Daochuo makes a stronger more universal argument for nianfo as the superior practice. Here. Daochuo emphasizes vocal recitation of Amitābha's name based on his interpretation of Amitābha's eighteenth vow in the Amitayus Sutra, framing it as a call for practitioners to recite the Buddha’s name. According to Michael Conway, this argument "is perhaps Daochuo’s most influential contribution to the development of Pure Land Buddhism in East Asia, because it served as the basis for both Shandao's and Hōnen's arguments regarding the exclusive practice of chanting Amituo’s name rather than engaging in any other Buddhist practices." In this section, Daochuo rephrases the eighteenth vow to include "continue for ten thought moments calling my name," thereby emphasizing vocal recitation of Amitābha's name.

Lastly, in chapter 4, Daochuo explains that while anyone who aspires to be reborn in the Pure Land and dedicates their efforts to that goal will achieve it, practitioners of nianfo gain two unique advantages that others do not. Before outlining these benefits, he highlights the exceptional efficacy of nianfo, stating that it "encompasses the various pāramitās" and "comprehensively cures the myriad obstructions." Due to this effectiveness, the Contemplation Sutra describes those who practice nianfo as being embraced by Amitābha's light and never abandoned—an initial benefit exclusive to nianfo practitioners.

Daochuo also cites the Sutra of the Prophecy Conferred on Avalokiteśvara (Guanyin shouji jing), which predicts that Avalokiteśvara will eventually succeed Amitābha as the Buddha of the Pure Land that Amitābha established. He strategically draws from this text to support the claim that only those devoted to nianfo are assured of continuously seeing Amitābha. By contrast, those who reach the Pure Land through other practices will ultimately part from Amitābha and continue their spiritual cultivation under Avalokiteśvara’s guidance. Through this reasoning, Daochuo emphasizes that nianfo offers two critical benefits unavailable through other methods, encouraging his audience to focus on it as "the essential path."

=== Nature of Amitabha and Sukhavati ===
Daochuo was the first known Buddhist author to describe the Buddha Amitābha as an enjoyment body (saṃbhogakāya), also known as a "Reward Body" (報身). In the Ānlè jí, Daochuo writes: "Amitābha in the present is a saṃbhogakāya and the paradise land adorned with jewels is a Reward Land."

Furthermore, while previous authors had argued that only noble bodhisattvas on the bodhisattva stages could attain birth in true reward lands (報土), Daochuo held that all kinds of ordinary beings could attain birth in Amitabha Buddha's reward land through the Buddha's power:

Amitabha Buddha’s Pure Land embraces those with capacities from the highest to the lowest; it is accessible to both ordinary and sacred beings. This Land of Infinite Life is the pure realm of Amitabha’s rewards. By virtue of his vows, it accommodates the full range of capabilities, allowing even those with virtues characteristic of ordinary beings to achieve rebirth there.

Before Daochuo, Chinese Buddhist authors generally considered Amitabha Buddha to be a nirmāṇakāya, a transformation body like Shakyamuni Buddha. Daochuo's position was influential and was later adopted by Chinese Pure Land figures like Shandao.

Daochuo then responds to a criticism from an opponent who quotes the Sutra of the Prophecy Conferred on Avalokiteśvara. This sutra contains a passage which states that in the future, Amitabha will manifest final nirvana and pass into cessation, at which point Avalokiteśvara bodhisattva will attain Buddhahood and take over as the Buddha of Sukhavati. Daochuo argues that since the Reward Body (saṃbhogakāya) has a beginning but no end and does not pass away into cessation, this passage only refers to a skillful manifestation of the saṃbhogakāya, not true cessation, which only a characteristic of a nirmāṇakāya. He then cites the Ratnagotravibhāga which states that the Reward Body has five characteristics: "teaching the Dharma, being visible, engaging in various activities without ceasing, and sometimes resting and disappearing." Thus, for Daochuo, saṃbhogakāya remains "without ceasing", but it sometimes manifests "resting and disappearing" (but does not really disappear, just like the Buddha does not really disappear in the Nirvana Sutra).

Daochuo also argues that Sukhavati has a similar nature. Some sentient beings may experience it as a land that changes, but ultimately it is eternal and unceasing: "Just as the Buddha's body is eternal, yet sentient beings perceive it as entering nirvana, so too is the Pure Land. Its essence is neither created nor destroyed, but sentient beings perceive it as such based on their own capacities."

=== Pure Land patriarchs lineage ===
The Ānlè jí contains one of the earliest listings of Pure Land patriachs. It is significantly different than what would later become the standard listing of Pure Land patriarchs in Chinese Buddhism. Daochuo's list of patriarchal succession is as follows:

Tripitaka Master Bodhiruci (菩提流支三蔵), Dharma master Hui-chu'ung (慧龍法師), Dharma master Tao-chang (道場法師), Dharma master Ta'n-luan (曇鸞法師), Dhyana master Ta-hai (大海法師), and Dharma master Fa-shang (法上法師, a major figure of the Dilun school).
