= Shaokang =

Shaokang is the Mandarin Pinyin spelling of a Chinese masculine given name. The same name is also spelled Shaw-kong in Mandarin Wade-Giles (used in Taiwan) and in Cantonese pronunciation.

People with this name include:

- Shao Kang (born 1978), the sixth king of the Xia dynasty of ancient China
- Wulong Shaokang (少康, d. 805), one of the thirteen patriarchs that promulgated the Pure Land tradition
- An Shaokang (安少康), Liu Yifei’s father who is the 1st Secretary in the Chinese Embassy
- Bai Shaokang (白少康; born 1962), member of the 19th Central Commission for Discipline Inspection
- Hong Wan (Wēn Shàokāng; born 2000), English professional footballer
- Jaw Shaw-kong (born 1950), Taiwanese media personality and politician
- Li Shaokang (李少康), forward in 2013 Guangzhou Evergrande F.C. season
- Liu Shaokang (劉少康), a character in Chinese television series Beauty's Rival in Palace
- Yu Shaokang (于绍康; 1925–1994), Chinese actor who is a nominee of the Golden Rooster Award for Best Supporting Actor
