= Avīci =

Lowest Level of the Naraka or "hell" realm in Buddhism

Chinese name
- Traditional Chinese: 無間地獄
- Simplified Chinese: 无间地狱
Transcriptions
Standard Mandarin
- Hanyu Pinyin: Wújiàn dìyù
Yue: Cantonese
- Yale Romanization: Mòuh gaan deih yuhk
- Jyutping: Mou4 gaan3 dei6 juk6

Alternative Chinese name
- Traditional Chinese: 阿鼻地獄
- Simplified Chinese: 阿鼻地狱
Transcriptions
Standard Mandarin
- Hanyu Pinyin: Ābí dìyù
Yue: Cantonese
- Yale Romanization: A beih deih yuhk
- Jyutping: Aa3 bei6 dei6 juk6

Burmese name
- Burmese: အဝီစိငရဲ
- IPA: [a̰wìsḭjɛ́]

Korean name
- Hangul: 아비지옥
- Hanja: 阿鼻地獄
Transcriptions
- Revised Romanization: Abijiok
- McCune–Reischauer: Abijiok

Alternative Korean name
- Hangul: 무간지옥
- Hanja: 無間地獄
Transcriptions
- Revised Romanization: Muganjiok
- McCune–Reischauer: Muganjiok

Japanese name
- Kanji: 無間地獄
- Hiragana: むげんじごく
Transcriptions
- Romanization: Mugen jigoku

Alternative Japanese name
- Kanji: 阿鼻地獄
- Hiragana: あびじごく
Transcriptions
- Romanization: Abi jigoku

Sanskrit name
- Sanskrit: Avīci (Sanskrit: अवीचि)

Pali name
- Pali: Avīci

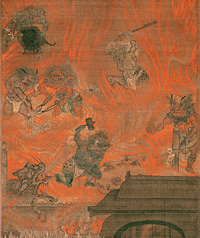
Avīci hell, 13th century, collected in Japan

Avīci or Avici (Sanskrit and Pali for "without waves") is one of the hells (naraka) in Hinduism and Buddhism. In Hinduism, it is one of the twenty-eight hells located in the kingdom of Yama, where individuals are reborn for bearing false witness and outright lying while transacting business or giving charity. In Buddhism, it is the lowest level of the Naraka or "hell" realm, with the most suffering, into which the dead who have committed grave misdeeds may be reborn. It is said to be a cube 20,000 yojanas (240,000 to 300,000 kilometers (150,000 to 190,000 miles)) on each side, buried deep underneath the divine (non-visible) earth. Avīci is often translated into English as "interminable" or "incessant", referring to suffering without periods of respite, although it is believed to be ultimately impermanent.

== Avīci-punishable offenses/transgressions ==
There are various evil acts which can lead one to being committed to the torments of Avīci. People reborn in Avīci have generally committed one or more of the Five Anantarika-karma ("Grave Offenses"):

- Killing one's father.
- Killing one's mother.
- Killing an arhat (enlightened being).
- Shedding the blood of a Buddha.
- Creating a schism within the sangha (the community of Buddhist monks, nuns, and laypeople who try to attain enlightenment).

== Details about Avīci ==
Buddhism teaches that going to Naraka is temporary, allowing the offenders to work off the karma they garnered in life. Avīci is sometimes cited as lasting 3.39738624×10^{18} or 339,738,624×10^{10} years, about 3.4 quintillion years.

The Lotus Sutra provides an example of humans who have to endure long-term suffering in Avīci. Some sutras state that rebirth in Avīci will be for innumerable kalpas (aeons). When the offending soul passes away after one kalpa, it is reborn in the same place, suffering for another kalpa, and on and on until it has exhausted its bad karma. For this reason, the Avīci hell is also known as the "nonstop way" (無間道).

Nichiren famously wrote that Buddhist monks who ignored the passages in the Lotus Sutra, which claimed superiority over other sutras, would fall into Avīci. Outside of Nichiren, it is extremely rare for a Buddhist monk to condemn anyone to Avīci, although the Lotus Sutra itself states of anyone who slanders it: "when his life comes to an end, he will enter the Avichi Hell."

Some believe rebirth in Avīci (or any lower realm, for that matter) should be seen as a process of purification. If anyone correctly follows the teachings of Buddha, they will be able to attain enlightenment without going to any hell even if they have accumulated a vast amount of negative karma (excluding Anantarika-karma).

There are many stories of people who have accumulated negative karma but avoided all the levels of Naraka because they attained enlightenment before their karma ripened; this should not be taken as the means being a justification for the ends, but doing one pure act of kindness can eradicate all past discretionary behaviour. If one has Anantarika-karma, they will not be able to attain enlightenment in this life because this negative karma will ripen immediately.

Buddhism accepts the principle of anattā, according to which there is no concept of self. Consequences are results of actions that are brought by in an impersonal manner described with the concept of karma. There is no supernatural being applying its own will to determine someone's fate: "[...] beings are owners of kamma, heir to kamma, born of kamma, related through kamma, and have kamma as their arbitrator. Kamma is what creates distinctions among beings in terms of coarseness & refinement."
