= Wulong Shaokang =

Chinese Buddhist monk

Wulong Shaokang (烏龍少康, 736–806) was a Chinese Buddhist monk in the Tang Dynasty, considered the Fifth Patriarch of the Pure Land School in Chinese Buddhism and in Japanese Jōdo-shū. He was later given the sobriquet "Later Shandao" for his influence in Chinese Pure Land Buddhism due to his devotion to Buddha-recitation (念佛, Nianfo). Shaokang eventually came to be regarded as a reincarnation of Shandao.

== Early life ==
Wulong Shaokang, also known by his secular surname Zhou (周), was born in 736 in Jinyun County, Zhejiang province.

According to traditional biographies, as a young child, Shaokang reportedly faced a mysterious inability to speak. His first words came during a visit to Lingshan Temple (灵山寺), where, upon seeing a Buddha image, he uttered, “Shakyamuni Buddha.” His parents, astonished, interpreted this as an indication of latent spiritual roots, prompting them to encourage his entry into monastic life. At age seven, he took initial vows, beginning his life as a monk. By fifteen, he had fully ordained at Jiaxiang Temple (嘉祥寺) in Yuezhou, demonstrating remarkable skill in studying the sutras and śāstras, including the Lotus Sutra, Surangama Sutra and Avatamsaka Sutra.

== Conversion to Pure Land ==
Traditional biographies state that early in his monastic career, Shaokang visited the renowned White Horse Temple in Luoyang, where he saw a bright light shining near some texts. He encountered a manuscript of Shandao's Teachings on the Western Land (西方化导文), which emitted a light once again, leading to visions of bodhisattvas. This which profoundly influenced Shaokang. While in Guangming Monastery in Chang’an, Shaokang saw Shandao's commemorative image rise into the air and declare to him that "if you carry out my teaching and benefit sentient beings, you will definitely be reborn in the Land of Bliss.” These experiences inspired him to dedicate his life exclusively to Pure Land practice, focusing on the recitation of Amitābha Buddha's name (nianfo).

Master Shaokang was creative in his approach to spreading Buddha-recitation. Arriving in Xinding (新定), where Pure Land practices were relatively unknown, he initiated a novel method to engage the community. He offered children coins in exchange for their reciting "Amitābha Buddha," thus planting the seeds of the practice in the hearts of the young. Over time, the entire local population adopted the chant; his efforts transformed the region into a hub of Pure Land devotion.

=== Wulong Mountain ===
In 795, Master Shaokang established a Pure Land practice center on Wulong Mountain (乌龙山) in Muzhou (in modern-day Jiande, Zhejiang), which became known as Yuquan Temple (玉泉寺), the ancestral home of Pure Land Buddhism in Zhejiang province. Here, he built a three-tiered platform for communal Buddha name recitation, gathering a substantial assembly of lay practitioners.

According to traditional accounts, Master Shaokang's devotions manifested extraordinary phenomena. As he chanted “Namo Amitābha Buddha”, Buddha images were said to emerge visibly from his mouth, an occurrence reminiscent of similar accounts surrounding Master Shandao.

== Final years ==
In 805, in the twenty-first year of the Zhenyuan era, Master Shaokang, then sixty-nine, sensed his impending rebirth in the Pure Land. Gathering his disciples, he delivered final teachings, instructing them to cultivate faith in the Pure Land while detaching themselves from the worldly sufferings of this world. He assured his disciples that those able to see the radiance emanating from his form at that moment were his true spiritual heirs. After giving this instruction, Master Shaokang entered meditative absorption, during which his body emitted light, and he peacefully attained rebirth in the Pure Land.

His disciples later constructed a pagoda to enshrine his relics, cementing his place in Pure Land tradition.

== Legacy ==
Master Shaokang is often referred to as the "Later Shandao" (后善导), a testament to his fidelity to Shandao's Pure Land vision. His methods of propagating Buddha-recitation and his purported spiritual feats reinforced his reputation as a key successor to Shandao and the Pure Land path. Many Pure Land Buddhists also regard him as an incarnation of Shandao, while some view him as a manifestation of Amitābha Buddha himself.

His surviving written works include Twenty-Four Praises (二十四赞 in one fascicle) and the Responses of Those Who Were Reborn in the Western Pure Land (往生西方淨土瑞應傳).

Master Shaokang's life and teachings illustrate a distinctive synthesis of Pure Land devotion, practical outreach, and spiritual discipline. Through his enduring influence, he strengthened the Pure Land tradition in China, fostering a legacy that inspired subsequent generations of Pure Land adherents. Each year, his parinirvāṇa (rebirth) is commemorated on the 3rd day of the tenth lunar month, reflecting his lasting spiritual impact on Chinese Buddhism.

== See also ==
- Buddhism in China
