= Anantarika-karma =

Five heinous offenses in Buddhism

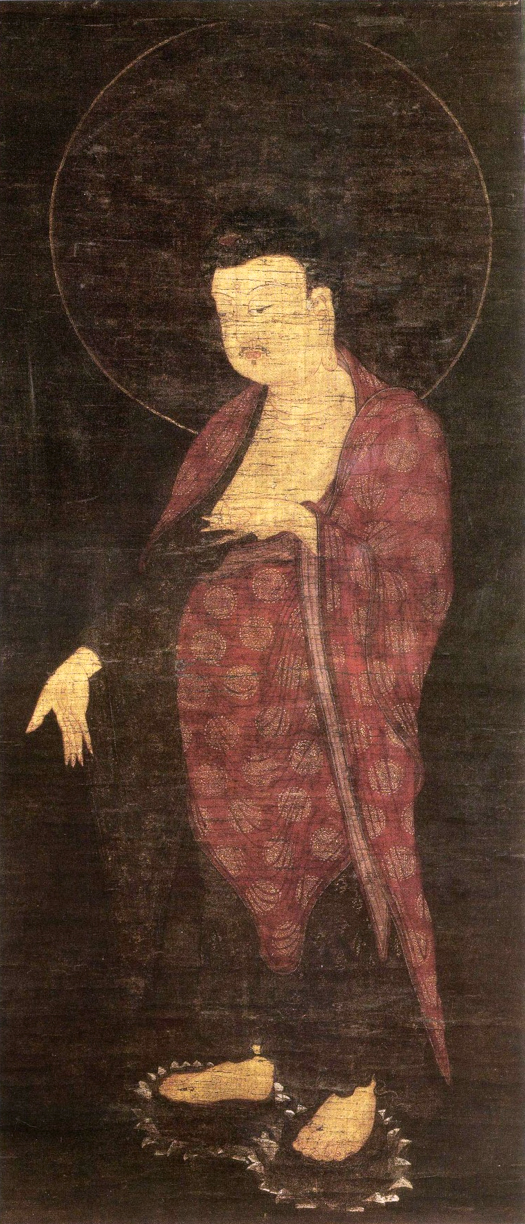
Amitabha Buddha (pictured) discusses the Ānantarika kamma in his Original Vow.

Ānantarika karma (Sanskrit) or Ānantarika kamma (Pāli) are the most serious offences in Buddhism that, at death, through the overwhelming karmic strength of any single one of them, bring immediate disaster. Both Buddhists and non-Buddhists must avoid them at all costs. Such offenses prevent perpetrators from attaining any of the stages of enlightenment and from ordaining into the Sangha. Those who have committed any of the five acts of Ānantarika kamma are said to be reborn in the naraka of Avīci, the very lowest of all the Hells of Buddhism. The Ānantarika kamma are:

1. Killing one's mother (matricide)
2. Killing one's father (patricide)
3. Killing an Arahant
4. Wounding a Tathāgata
5. Creating a Schism in the Sangha

== Etymology ==
Ānantarika derives from na, an, and antara.

An in this context refers to the "seed" of karma and antara means in storage, or waiting to germinate or bear fruit. These two words combined create anantara, which means a karma seed waiting to germinate. Na means "not", and therefore, ānantarika means "not stored to germinate/mature" or "brings vipāka (karmic consequence) immediately", leading to rebirth in hell.

== Ānantarika kamma in Mahayana Buddhism ==
Amitabha Buddha, one of the primary buddhas in Mahayana and the most widely-worshipped Buddhist deity in East Asian Buddhism discusses the Ānantarika kamma in his Original Vow. His vow reads:

If I attain Buddhahood and a sentient being aspires with faith and joy to be reborn in my Sukhavati Pure Land: if they recite my name just ten times and, in spite of this, are not reborn there, then may I myself not attain enlightenment [in the first place]. Two exceptions to this solemn promise are in respect of, firstly, those who have committed the five terrible offences [Ānantarika kamma] and, secondly, of those who have vilified the Sublime Dharma because such people cannot be reborn in Sukhavati.

— Amitabha Buddha

== See also ==
- Ajatashatru
- Avijjā
- Buddhist views on sin
- Devadatta
- Icchantika
- Karma in Buddhism
- Merit (Buddhism)
- Moha (Buddhism)
- Pratitya-samutpada
- Samsara (Buddhism)
- Three Poisons
- Twelve Nidanas
