= Huaigan =

Huaigan (懷感; c. 7th century) was a Chinese Buddhist monk who was the leading student of the Pure Land patriarch Shandao (613–681) and a key systematizer of Chinese Pure land thought. Huaigan's Shì Jìngtǔ Qún Yí Lùn [釋淨土群疑論, Treatise Explaining a Number of Doubts on Pure Land, T 1960 ] is a major work of Chinese Pure Land apologetics.

Huaigan's work remained influential on other Chinese figures like Yongming Yanshou and the Tiantai monk Zunshi (964-1032 C.E.). Huaigan was also important to Japanese Pure Land authors like Genshin. The Japanese Pure Land teacher Hōnen designated Huaigan as the fourth patriarch of the Pure Land Buddhist Jōdo-shū tradition.

== Life ==
The details of Huaigan's life are not clear. The dates of his birth and death also not well known.

The earliest source on his life is found in A Collection of Auspicious Responses to Birth in the Western Pure Land (往生西方净土瑞应刪傳; Wangsheng xifang jingtu ruiying shan zhuan T 2070), which contains a short account of his training under Shandao. The text states that early in his monastic career, Huaigan practiced at Qianfu Temple (千福寺) in Chang'an, studying the sutras. Later, he became a follower of Shandao, who encouraged him to devote himself to Pure Land meditation and to the recitation of Amitābha Buddha's name (nianfo). Huaigan practiced intensely for three years and received a vision of the Buddha's golden light emanating from between his eyebrows. Huaigan spent most of his teaching career in Chang'an, the capital of the Tang empire. He was likely the abbot of Qianfu and Da’anguo monasteries.

Huaigan's magnum opus and only surviving work is the extensive seven fascicle Treatise on Resolving Doubts About the Pure Land (Shì Jìngtǔ Qún Yí Lùn), which is the longest and most comprehensive texts of early Chinese Pure Land. According to Mengxian, the author of the preface to this work, Huaigan wrote it in order to defend Pure Land Buddhism from numerous critics who were slandering and attacking the tradition. 7th century Pure Land Buddhism was rapidly growing in popularity and this led to numerous critiques from various quarters, which in turn led to apologetic works like the Qún Yí Lùn.

Huaigan passed away before fully completing the work, which was later finished by his friend and fellow Shandao disciple Huaiyun. The text is organized in a question and answer format and answers one hundred and twenty one questions and critiques about Pure Land practice and theory, especially those which were commonly discussed by critics of Pure Land Buddhism.

Huaigan also may have worked on a collection of rebirth stories, the Wangsheng zhuan, as well as on some lost commentaries to the Pure Land sutras.

According to Marchman, it is likely that Huaigan died sometime between 695 and 701.

== Pure land thought ==
Huaigan's thought closely follows that of his teacher Shandao, but he also expands on it, drawing on Chinese Buddhist philosophies to add "significant philosophical depth" to it. His Shì Jìngtǔ Qún Yí Lùn is especially known for drawing on East Asian Yogācāra in his development of a comprehensive Pure Land philosophy.

The Shì Jìngtǔ Qún Yí Lùn is a comprehensive work which seeks to resolve various doubts about the Pure Land doctrine that had been raised by the masters of the She Lun, Three Levels sect (Sanjie jiao), and Yogācāra schools. Huai Gan was originally a trained in the Faxiang school of Yogacara. As such, his Shì Jìngtǔ Qún Yí Lùn is known for drawing on East Asian Yogācāra in his development of a comprehensive Pure Land philosophy.

=== Buddha and the Pure Land ===
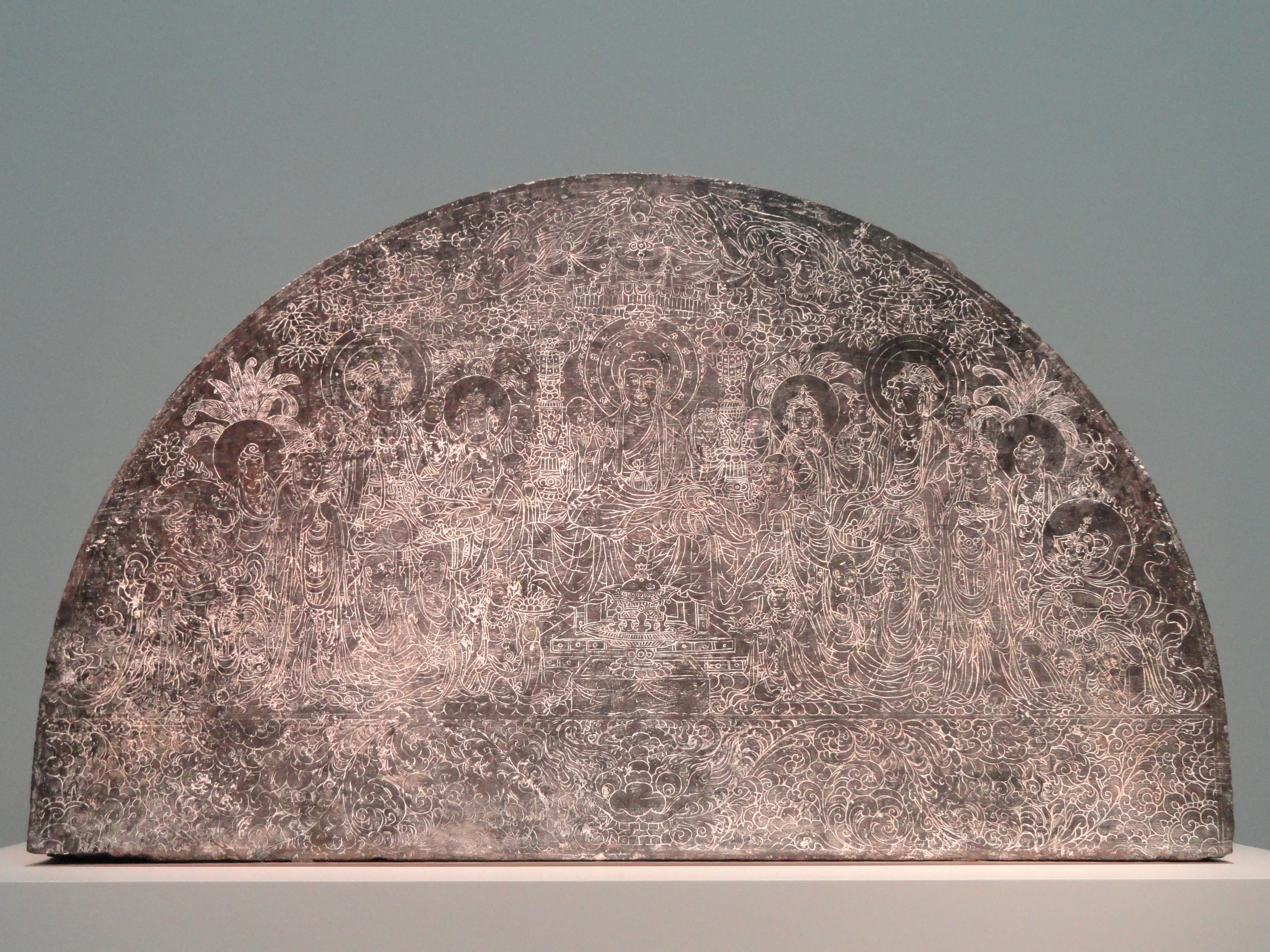
Lintel possibly showing the Western Paradise of the Buddha Amitabha, Shaanxi province, probably Chang'an, Tang dynasty, 8th century CE

Huaigan draws on the Yogacara triple body teaching (trikaya) to explain the nature of the Buddha Amitabha and of the pure lands, arguing that just as the Buddha has three bodies, there are three corresponding pure lands (a nirmāṇa land, a saṃbhoga land and a dharmakaya land).

The Dharmakāya and the Dharma-land are really the same ultimate reality, i.e. the Dharmadhatu, the ultimate truth. The true nature of the Dharmakāya and its Land is the pure dharma-realm (dharmadhātu) which is formless, without location or sensation

Regarding the saṃbhogakāya (the divine "enjoyment body" of the Buddha), Huaigan relies on the Yogacara teaching which presents two aspects of this body: the personal-enjoyment body (which a Buddha personally experiences) and the enjoyment body for others (which he displays for the beings in the pure land). Drawing on the Vimalakīrti Sutra and the Cheng weishi lun, Huaigan also argues that the enjoyment land also depends on the minds of beings who are born there (as well as on the Buddha's mind).

As for a transformation land (nirmāṇa land), this is what usually manifests to śrāvakas, to ordinary beings and to bodhisattvas before the first bodhisattva ground. Amitabha's Pure Land is both a saṃbhogakāya land and a Land and a transformation land. Before the first the bodhisattva ground, bodhisattvas only see the transformation land, afterwards they see the saṃbhogakāya. Huaigan writes that the nature of Amitabha Buddha's buddhafield is mind-only, and "only appears different to each person according to their own mind". This is why it can appear as a saṃbhoga land and as a nirmāṇa land. Thus, for Huaigan, Amitābha's body and land is not limited to any single form or appearance, since it manifests in limitless ways accessible to sentient beings.

Furthermore, Huaigan also states that even though only bodhisattvas above the first bodhisattva ground can see other saṃbhogakāya lands, Amitabha's land is unique in that it allows even ordinary beings to see the saṃbhogakāya. Due to the power of Buddha Amitabha's vows, even ordinary deluded people can see Amitābha's saṃbhogakāya pure land manifested for others in the way that bodhisattvas on the higher bodhisattva grounds can.

Though those beings may still have delusion in their minds, the pure land remains pure (and beyond the three realms) since it is created and maintained by the Buddha. Huaigan compares the imperfect perceptions of deluded beings born in the pure land to how an injured eye may perceive the sun incorrectly. The sun remains the same, it is the eye which perceives the sun in a mistaken way. Furthermore, according to Huaigan, deluded beings still experience some level of mental suffering in the pure land due to their own delusions. However this is greatly attenuated since their minds are being gradually transformed by the pure land and their progress towards Buddhahood is assured.

Huaigan's view is therefore that the Pure Land is on the level of the dependent nature, the level of cause and effect. He argues that Amitabha's Pure Land appears as pure and free of defilement due to the Buddha's power, but is actually with defilement (since it has the minds of ordinary beings within it). It is thus pure and impure, it appears as existent but is ultimately non-existent (since only the perfected nature is real). This view is a result of his consciousness-only philosophy which relies on the Yogacara theory of the three natures.

Regarding the various beings born in the pure land, Huaigan lists several types based on their level of purity, each one perceiving the pure land in their own way (which matches their capacities). As their minds develop spiritually, their perception of the pure land is also gradually purified over time. As Marchman writes, this points to the universality of the pure land path since Huaigan emphasizes the diversity of lands, minds, appearances, and social classes to illustrate how Amitābha’s Pure Land, through the immense power of Amitābha’s vows, is open to all beings. The key idea, as summarized in the Qunyi lun, is that “there is not one method.” Huaigan highlights the flexibility and nuanced nature of this concept while underscoring that, despite the variety of methods, they remain harmonious and non-conflicting.

Thus, for Huaigan, the pure land practice is accessible to all types of beings. As he writes, Pure Land can encompass:

the worldling and the āryan [noble beings], covers both the small and the great [vehicles], can be done with or without characteristics, within both focused and scattered states of mind by those of sharp or dull capacities, within long or short time frames with much practice or only a little.

=== Practice ===
Huaigan held that birth in the pure land is achievable by anyone who truly believes in the power of Amitābha’s vows. Furthermore, there is not one single method or practice to achieve rebirth in the Pure Land. Instead, Huaigan presents different practices according to the different circumstances, and capacities of individual practitioners.

Nevertheless, for Huaigan (like for his teacher Shandao), the practice of nianfo or buddha recollection (in its numerous variations like hearing the name, thinking of the name, visualization, and vocal recitation) remains the central and most effective practice for Pure Land aspirants. Huaigan writes that to attain birth in the pure land one must also have the right intention and proper faith in the power of the Buddha's vows. Without the proper intention, nianfo can only lead to birth in the heaven realms (deva-lokas) at best. As Huaigan writes, this is "like an arrow shot aimlessly, its force is eventually exhausted and it falls down."

Huaigan specifically differentiates between the different types of nianfo he recommends. The most common forms of Buddha recollection taught by Huaigan are:

- chengfo (稱佛, calling the name), also termed shengcheng fo (聲稱佛 to proclaim the Buddha). For Huaigan, this is especially useful for ordinary laypeople, for people of the lowest spiritual capacity and as a deathbed practice.
- guan (觀, buddha contemplation) nianfo, a more meditative practice in which one may attain a vision of the Buddha in samādhi, this was considered to be more dedicated practitioners and was considered by Huaigan to be the superior practice. This corresponds to the contemplations taught in the Contemplation Sutra.

Huaigan also emphasizes the importance of nianfo samādhi (a meditative absorption in the practice of buddha recollection). For Huaigan, the nianfo samādhi can involve contemplation of all three bodies (trikaya). Thus, Huaigan writes:

Generally speaking, nianfo involves mindfulness of all three bodies. If one seeks to attain the formless nianfo samādhi, one should contemplate the dharmakāya. If one seeks to attain the form-based nianfo samādhi, one should contemplate the saṃbhogakāya and the nirmāṇakāya.

Huaigan also recommends practicing buddha contemplation in a secluded and dark room. Furthermore, Huaigan reminds the reader constantly that the most important element for any nianfo practice is he most important qualification for nianfo practice is the "most sincere mind" (zhixin 至心). Indeed, for Huaigan, nianfo must be practiced with body, speech and mind:

Present sincere nianfo is the good deed of the mind; reciting the Buddha's name is the good deed of speech; joining palms in reverence is the good deed of the body. These three good deeds can eradicate the heavy evils of eighty billion kalpas of birth and death.

=== Rebirth ===
When it comes to explaining the process of rebirth in the pure land at the moment of death, Huaigan again relies on the mind-only philosophy of Yogacara, explaining that the visions of the Buddha coming to escort one to the Pure Land are mind made nirmāṇakāya buddhas. As Huaigan writes:

Now, everything that is reborn establishes a link through [the practice of] nianfo, and cultivates blessing through the sixteen contemplations. All the meritorious power [of the vows] is used for this cause. It is one’s own mind that magically manifests Amitābha Buddha greeting and accompanying them to the next life. It is said that the Buddha comes forth [upon death], but this is not genuinely coming forth. However, the meritorious ālayavijñāna alters rebirth, and it is the reason that [believers] see the nirmāṇakāya coming to welcome them [upon death]. Therefore, it is said that they do come forth, but, in reality, do not. This is the power and merit of Amitābha Buddha’s great compassionate vows.

== Influence and interpretations ==
Huaigan's work remained influential well into the Song dynasty, as can be seen by its impact on figures like Yongming Yanshou and the Tiantai monk Zunshi (964-1032 C.E.).

Huaigan's text was also an important source for Japanese authors on Pure Land Buddhism, including Tendai monks like Ennin and Genshin (942–1017) who cites Huaigan thirty three times in his Ōjōyōshū. Hōnen, the founder of the Jōdo-shū tradition, designated Huaigan as the fourth patriarch of Pure Land Buddhism.

However, Hōnen also writes that he prefers to follow Shandao's work over Huaigan, since "there is a great difference in thought between them. Therefore I do not prefer Huaigan". Hōnen's idea that Huaigan's thought is in disagreement and thus inferior to Shandao became a common view in Japanese Pure Land Buddhism and Huaigan's influence on Japanese Pure Land waned from the Kamakura period onwards.

But according to Marchman, Huaigan's thought is not radically different from Shandao's, even if he sometimes uses different terminology. Both Shandao and Huaigan both follow the classic trikaya theory, posit that Amitabha is a samboghakaya, and teach the various forms of nianfo (including recitation and visualization) as the main pure land practices that allow even ordinary persons to be born in the pure land. Furthermore, even though Huaigan does not refer to Shandao's "three minds", a central teaching of the master; sincere faith, vows and bodhicitta are still central to Huaigan's Pure Land teaching.

Marchman also questions another common view of Huaigan that he was also a follower of the Yogācāra school of Xuanzang (i.e. the Faxiang school). It is true that Huaigan often uses Yogācāra ideas and theories, and thus he was clearly influenced by the tradition and sought to draw on its theories to enhance the prestige and philosophical depth of Pure Land Buddhism. However, there is no indication that he was a formal follower of this school nor a student of Xuanzang, only that he sought to be inclusive and pluralistic.

Thus, according to Marchman Huaigan "was an inclusive pluralist, as long as a side was not threatening his beliefs" who also "demonstrated that Pure Land belief and practice easily integrates within other styles of Buddhism." While asserting the superiority of Pure Land Buddhism, Huaigan tolerated differing paths if they aligned with the view of Mahayana and allowed for the practice of Pure Land. This inclusive attitude reflected the broader milieu of his time, where monks with different interpretations often coexisted in the same monastery. Huaigan also emphasized the adaptability and flexibility of Pure Land Buddhism, explaining multiple views and perspectives to avoid alienating people. His ecumenical approach welcomed varied interpretations and new theories like Faxiang, promoting unity rather than division.

== Sources ==
- Marchman, Kendall R. (2015). Huaigan and the Growth of Pure Land Buddhism During the Tang Era (PhD).
- Liu; Ming-wood (2002-09-01). "The Life of Huaigan and His Conception of the Nature of the Buddha Amitabha and the Pure Land" 懷感的生平和佛身、佛土思想. Bulletin of the Institute of Chinese Literature and Philosophy 中國文哲研究集刊 (in Chinese) (21): 117–140.
- Jones, Charles B. (2019). Chinese Pure Land Buddhism, Understanding a Tradition of Practice. Honolulu: University of Hawai‘i Press.
- Liao Minghuo [廖明活] (2002). 懷感的往生論 [Huaigan's theory of Rebirth]. Chung-Hwa Buddhist Journal (15). Taipei: The Chung-Hwa Institute of Buddhist Studies. ISSN 1017-7132.
- Liao Minghuo [廖明活] (2003). 懷感的淨土思想 [The Pure Land Thought of Huai Gan]. Taipei: The Commercial Press of Taiwan [臺北：臺灣商務印書館股份有限公司].
