= Original Vow =

Key vow made by Amitabha Buddha which is central to Pure Land doctrine

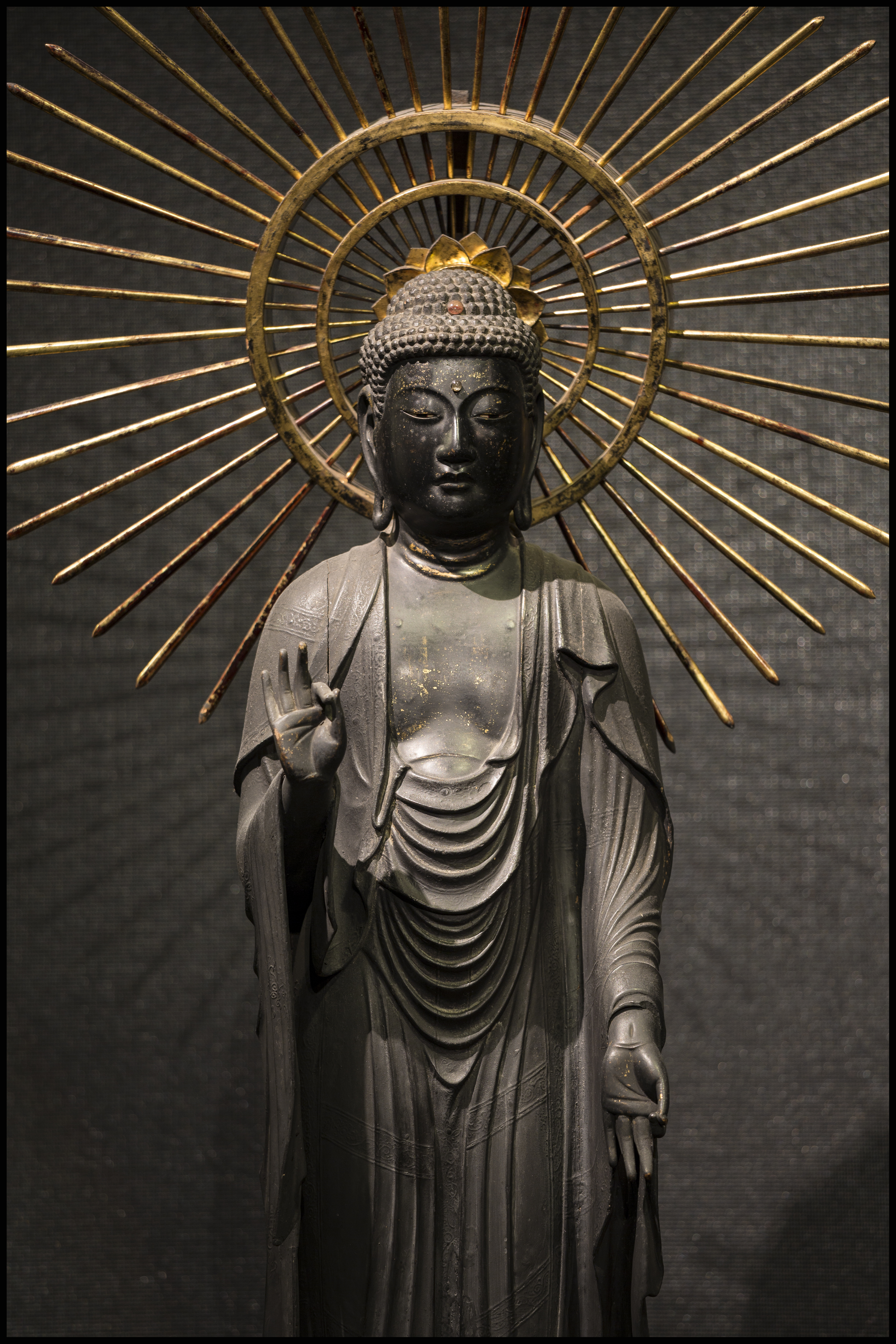
Standing Amida Buddha with forty eight rays which symbolize his past vows, Museo d'arte orientale (Turin)

In Pure Land Buddhism, the Original Vow, or Fundamental Vow (本願, hongan) refers to a forty eight part vow that Amitābha Buddha made (long ago when he was a bodhisattva named Dharmakara). The term is often used to refer solely to the 18th part of the vow in particular (sometimes just called the 18th vow), which is very important for Pure Land Buddhist doctrine, especially in Japanese Buddhism.

The term comes from the Sanskrit pūrva-praṇidhāna, which means Past vow or Previous Vow. This term originally referred to any bodhisattva vows made by any bodhisattva in a past life, which retain a special spiritual power even after Buddhahood. Thus, the term can also refer to the past vows of other figures, such as is the twelve vows of Medicine Master Buddha. In Pure Land Buddhism however, the term specifically refers to the vow of Amitābha Buddha (Jp: Amida Butsu) found in the Infinite Life Sutra.

The Japanese term Hongan is also the namesake of the Temple of the Original Vow (Hongan-ji), a temple in Kyoto which is also the head temple of the largest sub-sect of Jōdo Shinshū Buddhism.

== Overview ==
=== The text of the vow ===
The text of the 18th vow of Amitabha Buddha, according to Sanghavarman's edition of the Infinite Life Sutra (T360), reads:

If, when I attain Buddhahood, sentient beings in the lands of the ten quarters who sincerely and joyfully entrust themselves to me, desire to be born in my land, and call my Name, even ten times, should not be born there, may I not attain perfect Enlightenment. Excluded, however, are those who commit the five gravest offences and abuse the right Dharma.

An alternative translation reads:

If, when I attain buddhahood, the sentient beings of the ten directions, with sincere mind, entrusting themselves in joy, and desiring to be born in my land, even down to ten thoughts, should not be born there, may I not attain perfect awakening. Excluded are those who commit the five heinous crimes and slander the true Dharma.

In the Nepalese Sanskrit Edition of the Infinite Life Sutra (which was translated by Max Muller), the Fundamental Vow appears as vow number 19 in the list of vows. This text (which is considered a later recension" by modern scholars) also contains a few differences to the Sanghavarman edition. The fundamental vow in the Nepalese Sanskrit edition states:

sacenme bhagavan bodhiprāptasya aprameyāsaṃkhyeyeṣu buddhakṣetreṣu ye sattvā mama nāmadheyaṃ śrutvā tatra buddhakṣetre cittaṃ prerayeyuḥ, upapattaye kuśalamūlāni ca pariṇāmayeyuḥ, te tatra buddhakṣetre nopapadyeran, antaśo daśabhiścittotpādaparivartaiḥ sthāpayitvā ānantaryakāriṇaḥ saddharmapratikṣepāvaraṇakṛtāṃśca sattvān, mā tāvadahamanuttarāṃ samyaksaṃbodhimabhisaṃbudhyeyam ||

"O Bhagavan, if those beings who in immeasurable and innumerable buddhafields, after they have heard my name, when I shall have obtained awakening, should direct their minds toward my buddhafield and dedicate their roots of merit for the sake of rebirth there, if these [people] should not be born in that buddhafield, even if it be by as little as ten repetitions of the thought (cittotpāda-parivarta), barring always those beings who have committed the immediate transgressions (ānantarya), and who have caused an obstruction by rejecting the Good Dharma (saddharmapratikṣepa), then may I not awaken to unsurpassed, perfect, and complete enlightenment.

=== The exclusion clause ===
A key element that has been widely debated in East Asian Buddhism is the "exclusion clause" at the end of the vow, which states that beings who commit the five actions of immediate retribution (ānantarya karmani; which lead immediately to hell in the next life) and who slander the True Dharma, cannot be reborn in the Pure Land of Sukhavati through this vow. Pure Land Buddhist masters like Shandao relied on the Amitayus Contemplation Sūtra to argue that even those who had committed the five immediate transgressions would be saved. These five are: matricide, patricide, killing an arahant, harming a buddha, and creating schism in the sangha. The key passage they rely on is the passage which discusses how beings of the lowest rebirth grade (who have committed the five grave offences) are saved:

When such a foolish person approaches the end of their lives, they may meet a virtuous teacher who will comfort them in various ways, teach them the wondrous Dharma, and instruct them to recollect the Buddha's name. However, oppressed by suffering, these people will have no peace of mind to recollect the Buddha's name. So, the good friend will say to them, 'If you are unable to recollect that Buddha, you should recite "Homage to the Buddha of Immeasurable Life!" After completing ten recitations of 'Namo Amida Buddha,' by uttering the name of that Buddha, each recitation extinguishes the karmic transgressions that would otherwise entail eighty million kalpas of birth and death. At the time of death, they will see a golden lotus flower, like the sun, appearing before them, and in an instant, they will attain birth in the Land of Ultimate Bliss. In the jewelled flower, after twelve great kalpas they will remain. The lotus flower will then open. When the flower opens, Avalokiteśvara and Mahāsthāmaprāpta, with their voices of great compassion, will extensively explain the true nature of reality for them and eliminate the karmic seeds of their transgressions. Having heard this, they will rejoice, and at that moment, they will arouse bodhicitta.

The Pure Land patriarch Shandao, in his commentary on the Contemplation Sutra, explains how he interprets the exclusion clause in light of this second passage from the Contemplation Sutra as follows:

...the exclusion of slandering the Dharma and the five grave offences in the Forty-Eight Vows is because these two karmas create extremely heavy hindrances. If sentient beings commit them, they fall directly into the Avīci Hell and wander through kalpas without any hope of escape. However, the Tathāgata, fearing they would commit these two kinds of offences, used the skilful means of saying they could not be born there. This does not mean they are not embraced. Moreover, as for the Lowest Level of the Lowest Grade, which includes the five grave offences but excludes slandering the Dharma, the five grave offences have already been committed, so it would be wrong to abandon such beings to wander in transmigration. Instead, out of great compassion, they are embraced for rebirth.

As such, Shandao interprets the exclusion clause as a skilful means (upaya) to prevent beings from doing evil deeds and highlight the severity of these deeds. Thus, for Shandao, since the Buddha's infinite compassion embraces all beings, it does not make sense to say the exclusion clause is to be interpreted literally. Due to this, he also argues that even those who have slandered the True Dharma in the past can be saved by the Buddha's compassionate power:

As for the transgression of slandering the Dharma, which has not yet been committed, it is said that if one gives rise to slander, one cannot be born there. This is explained from the perspective of a person who has not yet committed the karma [i.e., is still determined to do so in the future]. However, if they have committed it, they will still be embraced for rebirth. Although they will be born there, the jewelled flower will remain closed for many kalpas.

Therefore, Shandao holds that beings who have committed the five crimes of immediate retribution and have slandered the Dharma can still be born in the Pure Land. They will still need to spend many eons enclosed inside a jeweled flower until their evil karma is purified however.

== Use of the term Primal Vow ==
The Japanese term hongan (本願) is derived originally from the Sanskrit term pūrvapraṇidhāna, meaning "past vow" or "previous resolution." However, the use of pūrvapraṇidhāna for the 18th vow of Amitābha is not known in Indian Buddhism, which does not treat the 18th vow in any special way. The term pūrvapraṇidhāna typically refers to all the original vows made by a bodhisattva in order to develop bodhicitta and begin striving toward Buddhahood. Regarding Pure Land practice in Indian Buddhism, Hajime Nakamura writes that as described in the Pure Land sūtras from India, buddhānusmṛti or "mindfulness of the Buddha" is the essential practice. Buddhānusmṛti is called nianfo in Chinese and nembutsu in Japanese.

== Role in Japanese Buddhism ==
In Japanese Buddhism, Amitabha Buddha is often associated with devotional practices, and he is regarded as striving to save those beings who are incapable of reaching Enlightenment through their negative karma, by leading them to Enlightenment. The founder of Jōdo-shū, Hōnen, emphasized the importance of the Primal Vow over the efficacy of practices espoused by his contemporaries in Tendai. These same teachings became central to the later Jōdo Shinshū sect as well.

This vow forms the basis of Pure Land Buddhism as well as nianfo/nembutsu. As in the vow, it applies not only to a dying person, death of self, but also to an animal, or a ghost wandering or in hell, if he has accumulated enough merits in present or past lives, and willing to go there.

== See also ==
- Divine grace
