= Other power =

Concept in some strands of Buddhism

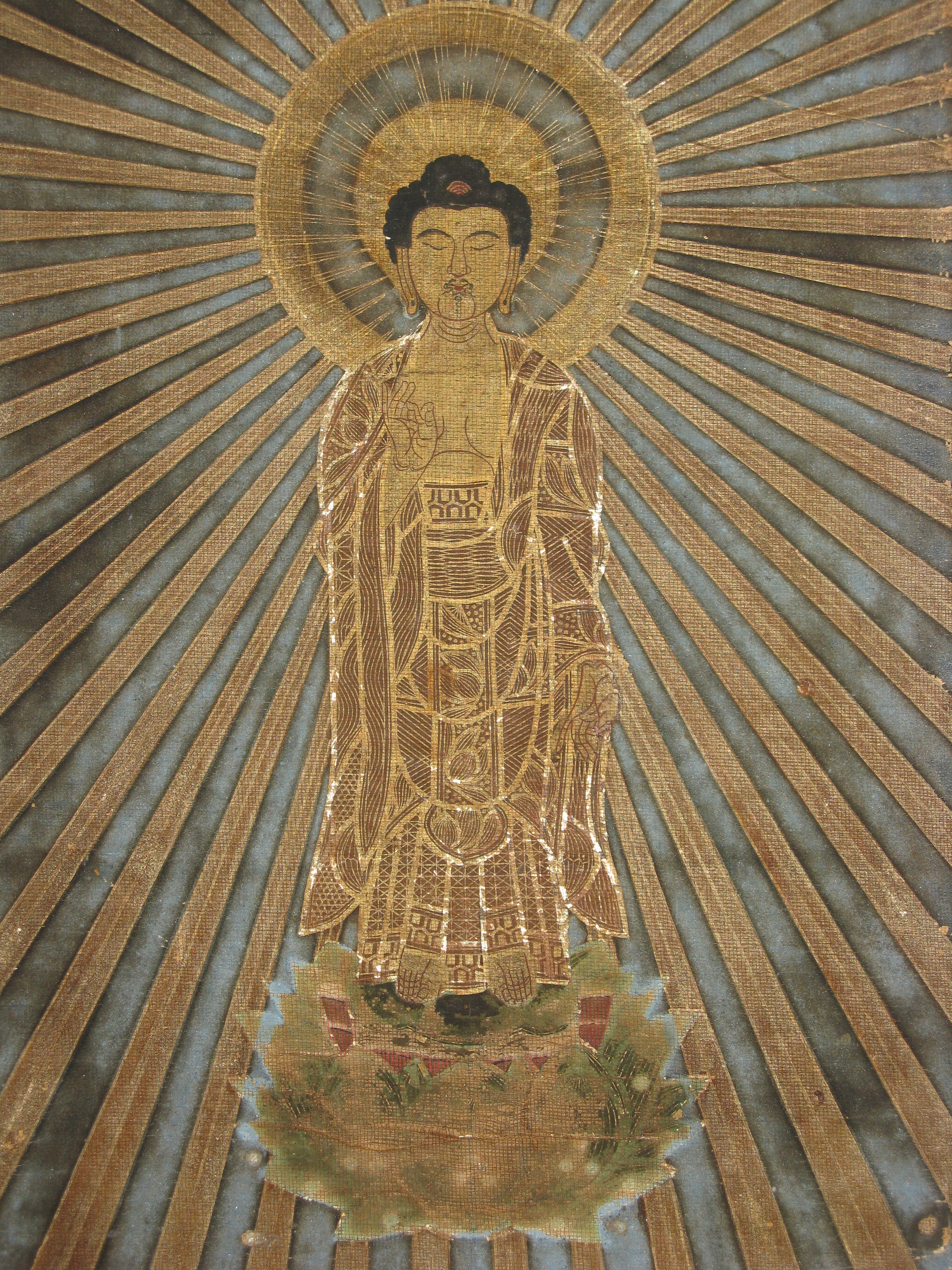
"Amida Manifesting in the Dharma-body of Expedient Means", Japanese painting, at the Met.

Other power (Chinese: tālì 他力, Japanese: tariki, Sanskrit: *para-bala) is an East Asian Mahayana Buddhist concept which is discussed in Pure Land Buddhism and other forms of East Asian Buddhism. It generally refers to the power of a Buddha which can inspire someone, and take them to the Pure Land where they may easily become a Buddha. Other power is often contrasted with "self power" or jiriki (自力, one's own strength; Chinese: zìlì), that is, attempting to achieve enlightenment through one's own efforts. According to Mark L. Blum, other power can be described as "something 'received' or 'influenced' from the sacred world beyond the self". Other power is also commonly called "Buddha-power" or "vow power" (願力, Chinese: yuànlì, Japanese: ganriki, Skt. praṇidhāna-vaśa), the latter referring to a Buddha's past bodhisattva vows (purvapraṇidhāna) which have a certain power to influence sentient beings.

While the term "other power" was coined in Chinese sources, Indian Mahayana literature contains numerous similar ideas that relate to the Buddha's power to influence living beings, such as anubhāva (influence or inspiration provided by the Buddha) and adhiṣṭhāna (the sustaining power of the Buddha). These ideas can be understood as the Buddha's "supernatural power," "grace," "empowerment," "divine blessings," and "divine protection".

Pure Land Buddhism considers itself the "easy path" because it relies on other power, while other Buddhist paths are seen as self power paths, also called "the path of sages". While all Mahayana Buddhists agree that the Buddha's power has some effect on Buddhist practitioners, different Mahayana traditions have different accounts of how the other power of the Buddha works and how one's own practice interacts with it. Some Pure Land Buddhists hold that we must abandon all "self power" practices (such as ascetic practices, repentance, various kinds of meditation) and all self effort, and rely only on Amitabha Buddha's other power. Others hold that one's own "self power" becomes linked with the power of the Buddha through "sympathetic resonance" (gǎnyìng 感應). This view of the cooperation of self power and other power is more common in Chinese Pure Land thought.

Tibetan Buddhism also affirms that there are multiple causes to rebirth in a Pure Land, and that both the Buddha's power and the power of one's own karmic force are contributing causes.

== Indian precedents ==
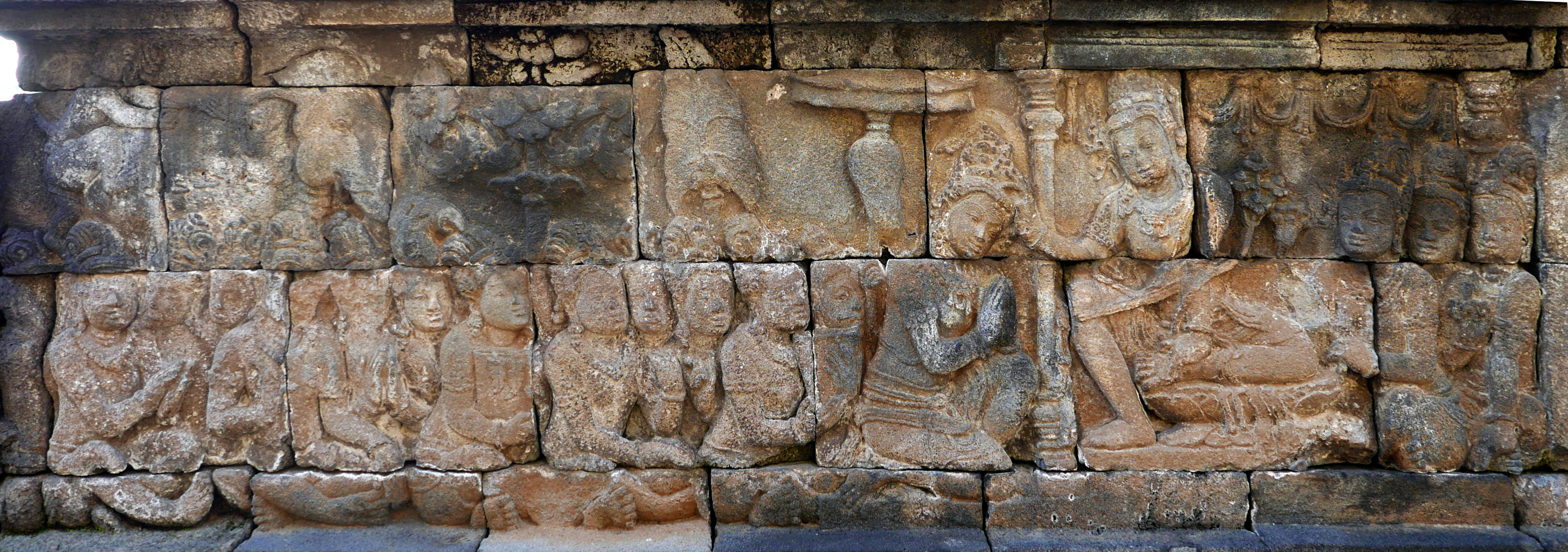
Samantabhadra bodhisattva blesses Sudhana

=== Early Buddhism ===
Among the early Buddhist schools, there were different opinions about the powers of the Buddha. All the schools accepted that the Buddha had various magical and psychic powers and that he could perform miracles. Some schools had a much more exalted view of the Buddha, while others still held that his powers were limited by his physical and impure human body. The Mahāsāṃghika schools saw the Buddha's powers as being transcendent (lokottara) and immense. Thus, the Lokānuvartanā sūtra, one of the few surviving Mahāsāṃghika sources, states that "the wisdom, the merits and the power of the Buddha are immeasurable." This sutra also states that the strength of the Buddha is "irresistible", "inexhaustible", "immeasurable" and "incomparable", and is able to shake all Buddhalands with one finger.

Likewise, Vasumitra's Wheel of the Formation of Doctrinal Divisions (translated by Xuanzang) states that a central tenet of the Mahāsāṃghikas was that "the material body (rūpakāya), supernatural power (prabhāva) and lifespan (āyus) of a Buddha is unlimited (ananta)." The Mahāsāṃghika also held that the Buddha was always in samadhi, and that all the speech of the Buddha was completely perfect since all of it was actually one single divine sound.

Furthermore, the Mahāsāṃghika school seems to have promoted devotional practice and bhakti to a high status and to have anchored this practice in the purity and radiance of the Buddha. The Mahāvastu, one of the few surviving Mahāsāṃghika texts, states:

The purity of the Buddha is so great that the worship of the Exalted One is sufficient for the attainment of Nirvāna, and that one already acquires endless merit by merely walking round a stupa and worshipping it by means of floral offerings...from the Buddha’s smile, there radiate beams which illuminate the entire buddhafields.

=== Mahāyāna sūtras ===
There are various Sanskrit concepts found in the Mahāyāna sūtras that are precedents to the East Asian concept of "other power", including:

1. Buddhānubhāva - This term refers to the "majesty", "authority, or "causal power" (anubhāva) of the Buddha which can influence others. In numerous Mahayana Sutras (e.g. Prajñaparamita sutra), the Buddha's disciples are often depicted as speaking or teaching "through the Buddha's power".
2. Buddhādhiṣṭhāna - Refers to the "sustaining power" or "supporting force" (ādhiṣṭhāna, Chinese: jiachi 加持) of the Buddha, often associated with his ability to inspire or bless beings.
3. Buddha-bala - This term literally means "the strength of the Buddha," where *bala* refers to the Buddha's strength or power, or more specifically, to special supranormal powers the Buddha has which he uses to perform miracles, such as the famous Twin Miracle. There are various lists of the Buddha's powers, such as the "ten powers" (daśabala), as well as lists which make use of other terms for magical power, such as ṛddhi and abhijñā.
4. Pariṇāmana - The idea that the Buddha performs a "transference of merit" (puṇya-pariṇāmanā), that he can infuse living beings with his measureless spiritual goodness, or "merit" (puṇya).
5. Praṇidhāna - The bodhisattva vows made by a Buddha when they were a bodhisattva is considered to have generated vast spiritual power and merit. This power, called "the power of the [Buddha's] past vows" (pūrva-praṇidhāna-vaśa), can help living beings who call on the Buddha's aid.
6. Buddhāvabhāsa (Buddha's "radiance" or "light") and Buddhajñāna (Buddha-knowledge). The light of the Buddha is sometimes used to signify his illuminating power or his knowledge, which in various Mahayana sources, like the Avatamsaka Sutra, is said to be all pervasive and omnipresent. According to sutras like the Avatamsaka, the Buddha's light and knowledge is said to be always influencing living beings throughout the cosmos.

According to Robert H. Sharf, terms like buddhādhiṣṭhāna and buddhānubhāva "are ubiquitous in Buddhist materials, where they denote the incursion of the divine into the mundane realm". Sharf also writes that these terms:

refer to the power of a tathāgata to come to the assistance of the supplicant, making possible the transposition of the supplicant into the realm of the buddha without the aid of supernormal powers acquired through one's own meditative accomplishment. Depending on context, these terms can be rendered in English as "supernatural power," "grace," "empowerment," "divine blessings," "divine protection," and so on. Such power or grace is not only directly toward sentient beings, but also toward sacred enclosures, religious implements, scriptures.

Douglas Osto meanwhile explains adhiṣṭhāna as "the ability to generate, manipulate and control reality", as well as "the power to induce visions in others and inspire them to speak the Dharma" as well as the power to radiate rays of light in all directions which teach Dharma. It also refers to the ability to enter samadhi, attain liberations (vimoksa), and the Dharma gateways (dharmamukha). In Mahayana sutras, the Buddhas are seen the ultimate source of this spiritual power.

=== The ten powers ===
There are several expositions of the power of the Buddha in the Early Buddhist Texts. Some sutras contain explanation of miracles and great feats performed by the Buddha. Other sutras outline his various amazing magical and wisdom powers. One common listing is the ten powers (daśabala), which are discussed in sources like the Mahāsīhanāda-sutta (Majjhima-nikāya) which also has a Chinese parallel in the Foshuo shenmao xishu jing 佛説身毛喜豎經 (T 17 592c–593b).

These powers are also discussed in Mahayana sutras and in Pali exegetical literature as well. The ten powers as listed in the Dà zhìdù lùn (Mahāprajñāpāramitopadeśa) are:

- Knowledge of what is possible and what is impossible (Sanskrit: sthānāsthāna-jñānabala)
- Knowledge of the results of all actions in all times (karmavipāka-jñānabala)
- Knowledge of the dhyānas, samadhis, liberations, absorptions, equilibriums, afflictions, purifications, and abidings (dhyānavimokṣasamādhisamāpattisaṃkleśavyavadānavyutthānajñānabala).
- Knowledge of the degree of the moral faculties of beings (indriya-parāpara-jñānabala)
- Knowledge of the aspirations of beings (nānādhimukti-jñānabala)
- Knowledge of worlds (loka) and their acquired dispositions or dhātus (dhātu-jñānabala)
- Knowledge of the way leading to the various [rebirth] destinies (sarvatragāminīpratipajñānabala)
- The knowledge of former abodes [past lives] (pūrvanivāsa-jñānabala)
- The knowledge of death and rebirth (cyutyupapāda-jñānabala)
- The power of the destruction of the impurities (āsravakṣaya-jñānabala)

Some lists of the ten powers are slightly different. For example, the Pali listing includes a "knowledge of all worlds composed of various and diverse elements", referring to material elements (dhātus). According to the Theravada Niddesa-aṭṭhakathā, these powers are unique to the Buddhas.

=== In Prajñāpāramitā literature ===
The Aṣṭasāhasrikā Prajñāpāramitā Sūtra contains various statements on the Buddha's power to influence the speech of his disciples. Indeed, most of the statements made in the sutra by figures other than the Buddha, like Subhuti or Sariputra for example, are said to be caused by the Buddha's power (buddhānubhāva). For example, the initial chapter of the Aṣṭasāhasrikā states:

Whatever, Venerable Sariputra, the Lord’s Disciples teach, all that is to be known as the Tathagata’s work. For in the dharma demonstrated by the Tathagata they train themselves, they realise its true nature, they hold it in mind. Thereafter nothing that they teach contradicts the true nature of dharma. It is just an outpouring of the Tathagata's demonstration of dharma.

The Aṣṭasāhasrikā also states the Buddha's power sustains and supports bodhisattvas as they practice the path:

Sariputra: It is through the Buddha's might [anubhava], sustaining power [adhisthana] and grace [parigraha] that bodhisattvas study this deep perfection of wisdom, and progressively train in Thusness?

The Bhagavan: So it is, Sariputra. They are known to the Tathagata, they are sustained and seen by the Tathagata, and the Tathagata beholds them with his Buddha-eye.

Other Prajñāpāramitā sources go even further, claiming that the Buddha's power can not only inspire beings, but liberate them. The Dà zhìdù lùn (Mahāprajñāpāramitopadeśa) states:

The power of the Buddha (buddhabala) is immeasurable (apramāṇa): it is a trifle for him to save the beings of the three-thousandfold world system (trisāhasramahāsāhasralokadhātu).

The Dà zhìdù lùn then asks why are any other Buddhas needed and why all beings have not already been saved by the Buddha's power? To which three main reasons are given:

- "Because beings are infinite (apramāṇa) in number and do not all ripen (paripakva) at the same time."
- "causes and conditions (hetupratyaya) vary for each being."
- There are a measureless number of world systems, and "universes (lokadhātu) are infinite (ananta) and unlimited (apramāṇa) in number. If they were finite and limited, the number of beings would be exhausted."

=== In other Mahayana sutras ===
In the Lotus Sutra, the idea of a Buddha's sustaining power (adhiṣṭhāna) is closely associated with their "past vows" (pūṛvapraṇidhāna). In one passage, the ancient Buddha Prabhutaratna mentions how he made a vow long in the past that a stupa containing his bodily relics would have the power to manifest in all the worlds where the Lotus Sutra was being taught. Similarly, in the Amitāyus Sutra (i.e. the Larger Pure Land Sutra), the past vow of the Buddha Amitābha is said to have the power to create a totally pure buddhafield (Sukhavati) which is accessible to any being that thinks of Amitabha and wishes to be reborn there.

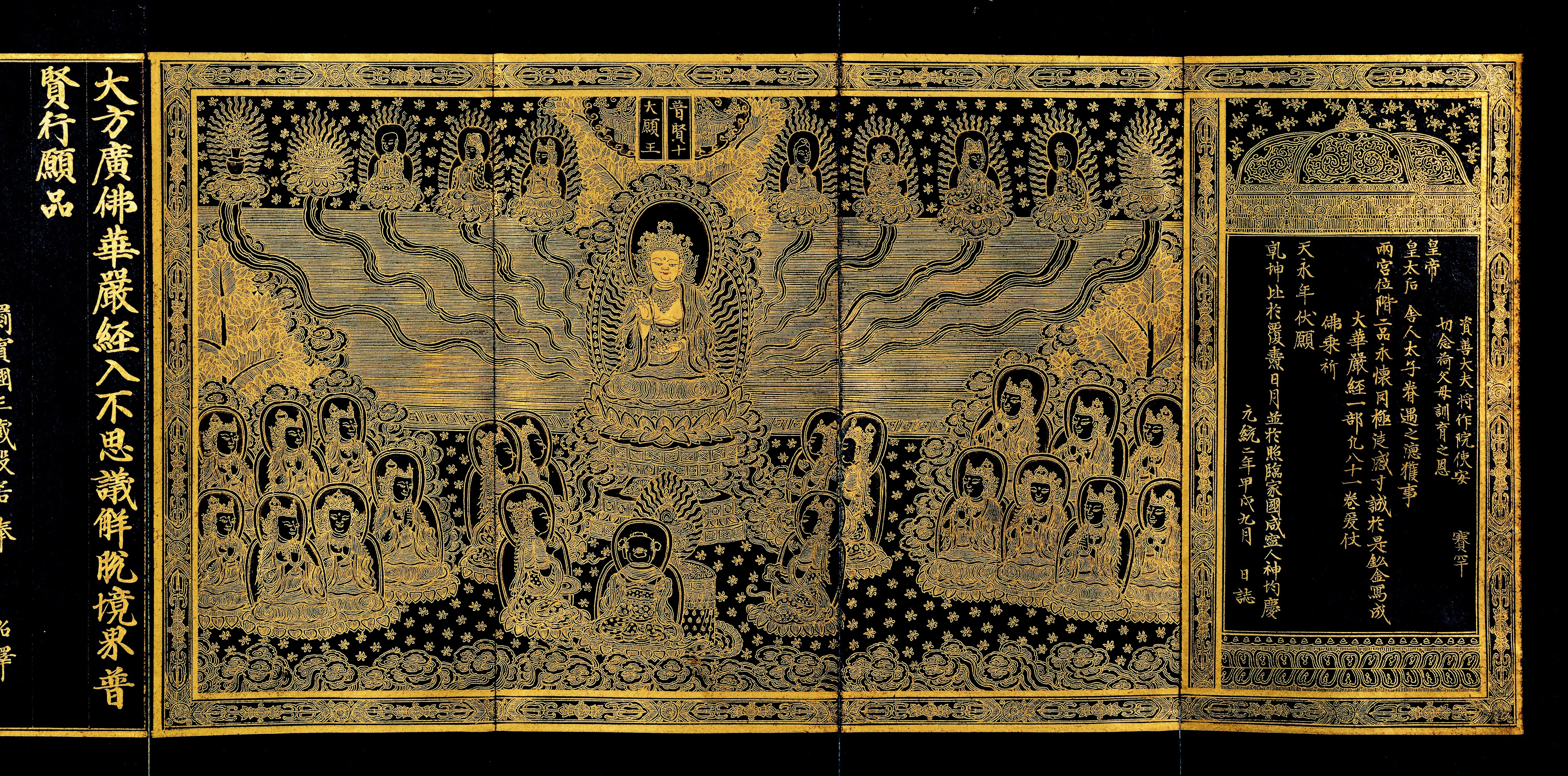
The Buddha manifesting a marvelous array, from an illustrated manuscript created in the Goryeo Dynasty

The concept of the Buddha's power was an important element of Indian Mahayana worship which focused on various Buddhas and bodhisattvas. Sutra which discuss practices meant to invoke and ultimate see the Buddhas, like the Pratyutpanna Samādhi Sūtra, mention the Buddha's influence as one of the conditions for seeing a Buddha and hearing them teach the Dharma. One Chinese translation of this scripture (by Jñānagupta) states that "the vision of the Buddha arises in dependence upon three causes", which are the Pratyutpannasamādhi itself, the "empowerment of the Buddha" and the ripening of one's good roots of merit. In this Chinese edition, "empowerment of Buddha" is likely a translation of buddhādhiṣṭhāna, but in the Tibetan translation, the term used corresponds to the closely related term buddhānubhāva.

The Gaṇḍavyūha sutra also speaks of the Buddha's power or adhiṣṭhāna, which is described as inconceivable and all-pervasive. The sutra states that it is The Buddha Vairocana appears as the king and the source of all spiritual power. All other bodhisattvas and spiritual friends are arranged on a hierarchy under the Buddha based on their spiritual power, as in an Indian monarchy, with Manjusri and Samantabhadra as chief ministers and Maitreya as the crown prince. The sutra begins with the Buddha entering samadhi and then magically transforming all of Jeta's grove into a limitless space or "array" (vyūha) filled with jewels, gold and other precious substances, illustrating the Buddha's power to transform the world into a "supreme array" (gaṇḍavyūha). The Buddha later radiates beams of light from the ūrṇā between his eyebrows which causes the bodhisattvas in his retinue to see all buddhafields in the entire Dharma realm. The power of the Buddha is said to be beyond human understanding according to the sutra, which states: "it would not be possible for the world of humans and gods to understand...the power (adhiṣṭhāna) of the tathāgata ... except through the power of the tathāgata".

Likewise, various passages in the Avatamsaka Sutra emphasize the Buddha's power and how bodhisattvas are reliant on it for their spiritual growth. For example, the sutra's "Vairocana" chapter states that Samantabhadra's entry into samādhi is dependent upon the power of the original vow of Vairocana Buddha. In the ‘‘Ten Abodes’’ chapter (Shizhu pin 十住品) two powers of the Buddha are mentioned, the power of the original vow and the power of the majestic divinity (威神力). However, the Avatamsaka Sutra also mentions that it is not only the Buddha's power that leads to a bodhisattva's development on the path, since it also mentions the pure power of the practices and vows (行願力), and the power of wholesome roots (善根力).

The Buddha's adhiṣṭhāna is also discussed in the Laṅkāvatāra Sūtra (chapter two), where it is seen as "the cultivation of noble wisdom in its triple aspect" in which a bodhisattva must train in after having "gained a thorough understanding of mind by means of transcendental knowledge" (i.e. the first bodhisattva level). The three aspects of cultivating noble wisdom are "(1) imagelessness; (2) the power added [adhiṣṭhāna] by all the Buddhas by reason of their original vows [pūrvapraṇidhāna]; and (3) the self-realisation attained by noble wisdom." The sutra indicates that the bodhisattva trains in these aspects of wisdom even as far as the eighth bodhisattva level (bhumi).

In other passages, the Laṅkāvatāra states that the sustaining power (adhiṣṭhāna) of Buddhas sustains the Samādhis of bodhisattvas, allows Buddhas to manifest to bodhisattvas, and grants a special samadhi called "Light of Mahāyāna" that allows them to see visions of Buddhas. Indeed, the Laṅka goes as far as saying that "whatever Samādhis, psychic faculties, and teachings are exhibited by the Bodhisattva-Mahāsattvas, they are sustained by the twofold sustaining power of all the Buddhas." Furthermore, the Laṅka also explains that the reason the Buddhas bestow their sustaining power on the bodhisattvas is in order to protect them from falling back into bad states, wrong views, or into the path of Śrāvakayāna.

The Secrets of the Tathāgata Sutra states that any understanding of the Dharma is through the assistance of the Buddha's power:

It would not be possible otherwise for all sentient beings abiding anywhere to accord with the secrets that the Tathāgata teaches if they did not contain the Tathāgata’s power of assistance and accord with the Tathāgata’s Dharma nature. Furthermore, if one hears, if one speaks, and if one has an understanding about the profound Dharma of the secrets taught by the Tathāgata, then that is all by virtue of the power of the Tathāgata’s assistance.

=== Vajrayana ===
In the period of Mantrayana or Esoteric Buddhism, the idea of Buddha's power influencing the practitioner came to be applied to tantric practices, such as the use of mantras, mandalas, and tantric initiation (abhiṣeka). Mantrayana ritual theory generally held that the use of esoteric practices like mantras and mudras allowed the tantric practitioner to reproduce and embody the power of the Buddhas. This could be used to achieve liberation or for other magical means. For example, according to the Root Manual of the Rites of Mañjuśrī, a Mantrayana ritual text:

The power of all the buddhas, and the bodhisattvas who are full of wisdom, manifests itself as an accomplishment in all activities that involve the mantras. It is in order to bring about this accomplishment that this king of manuals has been taught by the lord of sages.

Thus, the text (and other Buddhist tantras like it) claims to provide special and secretive ritual practices which allows human beings to tap into the enlightening power of a Buddha so they may themselves be transformed into beings of power.

== East Asian Buddhism ==
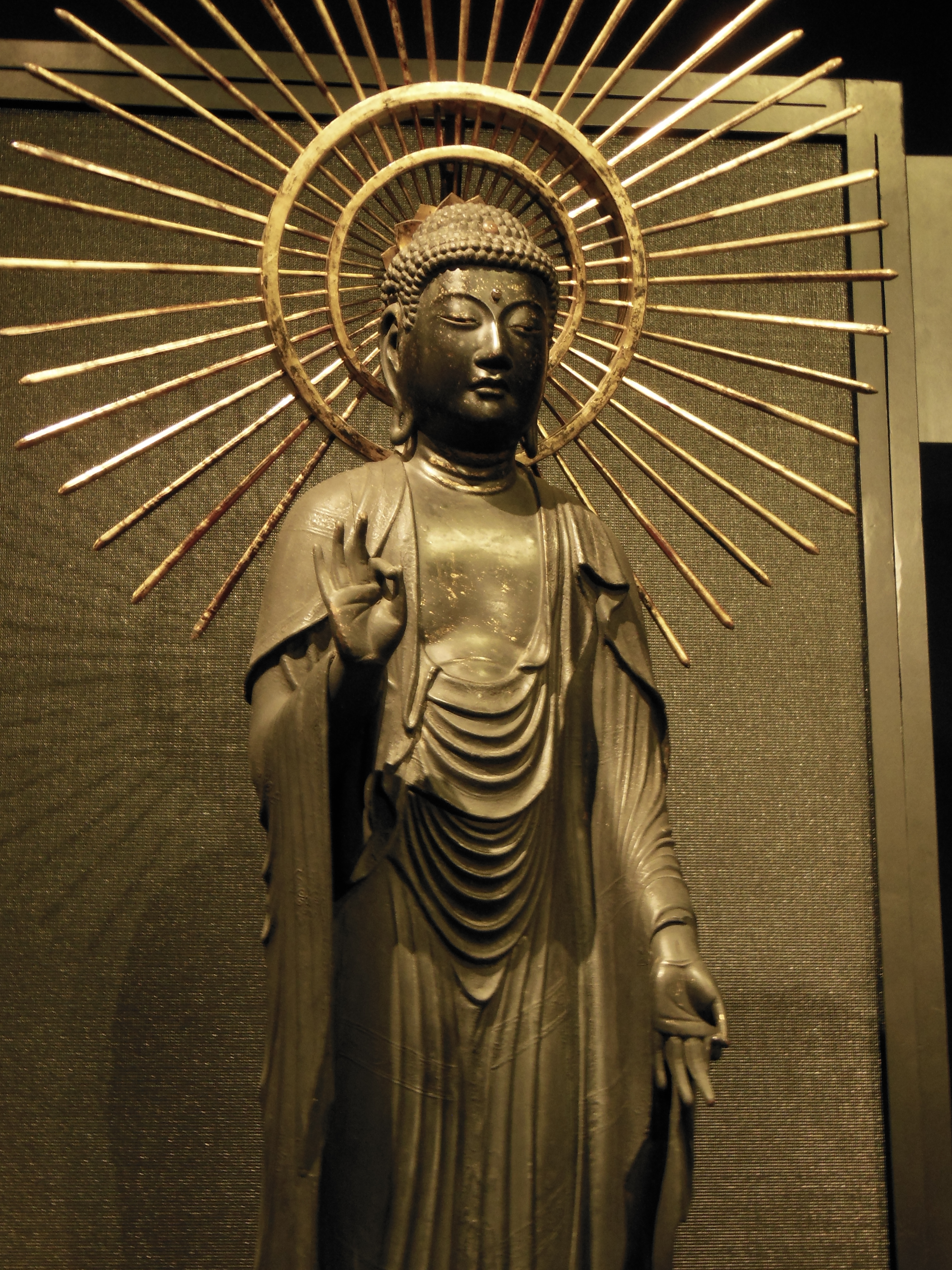
In East Asian Buddhist art, the power of the Buddha Amitabha (Measureless Light) is often depicted through a halo, aureole or rays of light emanating from his head.

=== In Chinese Buddhism ===
According to Charles B. Jones, the terms “other-power” (tālì 他力) and “self-power” (zìlì 自力) are fundamental to the tradition of Pure Land Buddhism. Understanding the relationship between one's individual efforts and the power of Amitābha Buddha is one of the "most central and enduring preoccupations" of Pure Land Buddhist thought. Another term used in Pure Land Buddhism for other power is "power of the past vow" or "vow power" (本願力 or 願力, Skt. pūrva-praṇidhāna-vaśa), referring to the past vows of Amitabha Buddha (and often, specifically, to the Primal Vow).

The two terms are also often associated with the idea that there are two paths: a “path of difficult practice” (nánxíng dào 難行道, also called “path of sages”, shèngdào 聖道) which relies only on one's own power, and the “path of easy practice” (yìxíng dào 易行道) or the path of “rebirth in the Pure Land” (wǎngshēng jìngtǔ 往生淨土) which mainly relies on the Buddha's power.

The Chinese term tālì (other-power) appears in various early translations of Buddhist sutras, including Buddhabhadra's translation of the Avataṃsaka Sūtra, Faxian's translation of the Nirvāṇa Sūtra, and various translations of Bodhiruci (such as his Laṅkāvatāra). Bodhiruci's Saṃdhinirmocana-sūtra translation contains a passage which states: "the characteristics of other-power are the characteristics of ultimate truth (paramārtha)." One of the first doctrinal discussions of the term appears in the works of Tánluán (476–542), who is also the first thinker to apply the term to a Pure Land context.

According to Tánluán, other-power is "the dominant causal condition" (Sanskrit: adhipatipratyaya) for the attainment of complete Buddhahood. Thus, he writes:

On the path of easy practice, one simply aspires to the born in the Pure Land with faith in the Buddha as the cause. Carried by the power of the Buddha's Vow, one quickly attains birth in that Buddha's pure land. Sustained by the Buddha's power, one immediately enters the stage of the rightly settled of the Mahayana.

Tánluán compares other power to "a pile of firewood accumulated by a hundred men for a hundred years that can be burned in half a day by a bean-sized spark." He also compares it to "a lame man boarding a boat and traveling a thousand li in one day." While the 7th century Chinese Pure Land patriarch Shandao does not actually use the term "other-power" in any of his extant works, he does make use of equivalent terms like "buddha-power" (佛力), "sacred power" (聖力), and "vow power" (願力). However, the most common manner in which Shandao discusses the power of the Buddha is as karmic causality (緣, yuán) or karmic power (業力). For example, Shandao writes:

The ability of ordinary people, both good and bad, to attain birth [in the Pure Land] happens for no other reason than being carried by the karmic power of the great vows of Amitabha Buddha as the dominant karmic condition.

According to Charles Jones, it was Tanluan and Shandao who first defended and popularized the idea that birth in the pure land could be attained by ordinary sentient beings through the power of the Buddha Amitabha. Shandao went as far as to say nobody was excluded, even those who committed the five heinous crimes (such as killing one's parents, killing a monk, etc), since the Buddha's compassionate power extended to all. Before these Pure Land figures, Chinese authors had argued that one required extensive practice on the bodhisattva path and much merit to reach the pure land. But for Shandao, even ten recitations of Amitabha's name could lead to the Pure Land, due to Amitabha's inconceivable power. This view soon became very popular, becoming a central teaching of Pure Land Buddhism in China and on the East Asian mainland in general.

At around the same time in Korea, the monk Wŏnhyo (617–686) also defended a similar view in his commentary on the Larger Sutra. According to Wŏnhyo, birth in the Pure Land could be attained by relying on the other-power of the compassion (chabiryŏk 慈悲力) of the Buddha, rather than by relying on one's own self-power.

==== The relationship between self- and other-power ====
According to the Chinese Buddhist tradition, rebirth in a Pure Land is attained through self-power and other-power working together.

The concepts of other and power and self power were discussed by the key figures of the Huayan tradition. The Huayan Patriarch Zhiyan (c. 602–668) says in his Souxuan ji 搜玄記 (Record of Searching the Mysteries) that the divine power of the Buddha cannot be received through self-power. However, he does not reject that after this empowerment (加被) from the Buddha, bodhisattvas also rely on the power of their own practices and vows to put this empowerment into practice. This Huayan view of the necessity of both self and other power is also defended by Fazang (643–712) in his Tanxuan ji 探玄記 (Record of Exploring the Mysteries). According to Fazang, other-power and self-power should be understood as being interfused (ronghe 融合).

Chinese thinkers like Yúnqī Zhūhóng (1535–1615) explain self- and other-power through the concept of "sympathetic resonance" (gǎnyìng 感應, "stimulus-response") which is a kind of attunement that is compared to how one plucked string in a lute can make another string nearby resonate. This is understood as a relationship which occurs when, through their own efforts, a practitioner stimulates or affects (gǎn) a Buddha's power, which expresses itself as a compassionate response (yìng). Thus, when one faithfully recites Amitabha's name (nianfo) wishing to be reborn in the pure land, the Buddha responds, and one's mind is attuned with Amitabha's mind (and vice versa). Yuán Hóngdào (1568–1610) uses various similes to describe this resonance, such as how "one mighty wind produces its howling noise in dozens of small apertures. The trickling of large amounts of water through a mountain assists thousands of ants in their tunnel making. Sails made of reed mats help many boats catch the power of the wind to get them to their destinations."

The doctrine of "sympathetic resonance" was also used outside of the Pure Land tradition as well, including by figures like the Sanlun scholar Jizang. According to Jizang, sentient beings can stimulate the Buddha because they have Buddha nature, and the Buddha responds to this stimulus because all beings are their children. Ultimately though, the reason there can be stimulus-response is because beings and Buddhas have the same nature. The Tiantai scholar Zhiyi described the "wonder of stimulus-response" with the following simile: "Water does not rise, nor does the moon descend, yet in a single instant the one moon is manifest in manifold waters." Thus, when the waters of the mind are clear and calm, the Buddha appears. "Sympathetic resonance" was also used by Esoteric Buddhist thinkers, which drew on it to explain the Mantrayana ritual of empowerment.

However, Chinese Pure Land figures like Yuán Hóngdào and Jìxǐng Chèwù (1741–1810) also argue that the other-power - self-power distinction is a relative one and that ultimately, the path is beyond such distinctions. Thus, on the level of ultimate reality, there is no real distinction between sentient beings and Amitābha, that is to say, they are really non-dual. According to these figures, while the Pure Land path relies on the self power - other power distinction on the level of conventional truth, this will ultimately be dissolved upon Buddhahood. Jìxǐng Chèwù writes that while non-dual, the Buddha and the practitioner can be seen as distinct on the relative level. Sentient beings are really within the mind of Amitābha, and Amitabha is also in the mind of sentient beings. It is because of this that sympathetic resonance can occur. When the practitioner is mindful of the Buddha, the whole reality of the Buddha is manifest. In other words, "If sentient beings within the mind of Amitābha recollect (niàn 念) the Amitābha within the mind of sentient beings, then how could the Amitābha within the mind of sentient beings fail to respond to the sentient beings within the mind of Amitābha?"

=== In Japanese Pure Land ===
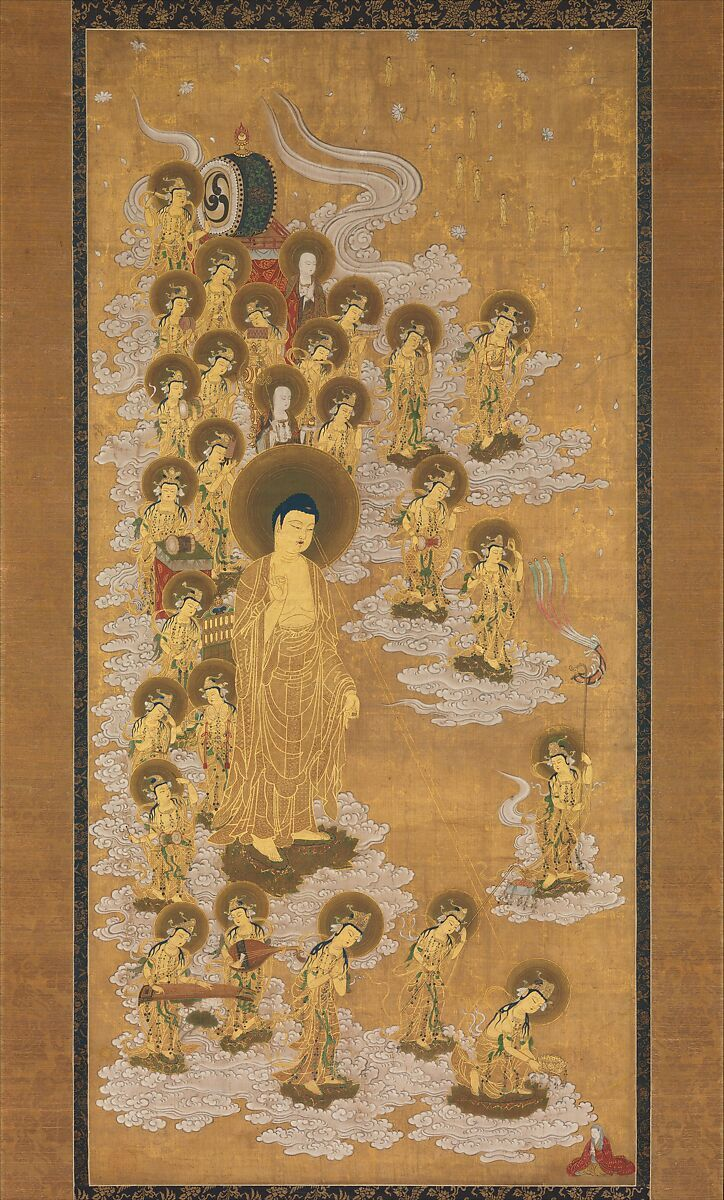
Descent of Amida Buddha and Twenty-five Bodhisattvas, 1668, Japan, Edo period (1615–1868). Note the light ray shining from the Buddha's forehead, a symbol of the Buddha's power.

The traditions of Japanese Pure Land Buddhism put a special emphasis on relying exclusively on Amitābha Buddha's "other power" (Jp: tariki) as the only sure path to Buddhahood. Generally speaking, in the Japanese traditions who follow the teachings of Hōnen (法燃, 1133–1212) and especially those who follow Shinran, self-power (Jp: jiriki) is seen as not having any influence on a devotee's attainment of rebirth in the Pure Land. Instead, one must rely solely on the other-power of Amitābha. This perspective, which was widely taught by the disciples of Hōnen, is often called "absolute other-power" by modern scholars.

The 12th century founder of the Japanese Pure Land movement, Hōnen, describes other-power as follows:

Power other than self means having implicit faith in the repetition of nembutsu with a firm belief in the assurance of birth in the Pure Land, without looking back on one’s virtuous or vicious deeds. To illustrate, a fly may alight on the tail of a Chinese mythological, fiery horse. Should the fiery horse leap, the fly will travel one thousand miles in an instant. Even a lowly and vulgar man who joins the caravan of a universal sovereign (cakravatin) will be able to traverse the four continents in a day. This is called the power other than self. Further, even a large boulder, placed on a ship, will be transported to the far shore in due time. This is possible not by the mobility of the stone but by the ability of the ship. Likewise, one will see accomplishment through the power of Amida Buddha, which is referred to as the power other than self.

According to Hōnen, it is because of its focused reliance on the Buddha's power that the Pure Land path of the nembutsu is the "easy" practice. This ease makes it the most suitable and available for all sorts of people, and thus it is the best path. This view was contrary to most of the traditional Buddhist views at the time which saw the more difficult practices (which were mostly accessible to monks and elite practitioners) as superior and more advanced.

However, Hōnen's writings rarely make use of the term and only mention it a few times. It is really only in the works written by Hōnen's disciples like Shōku, Ryūkan, Shōkō (Benchō) and Seikaku, that the term tariki (other-power) becomes a major topic of debate and discussion. Ryūkan wrote a work entitled The Matter of Self-Power and Other-Power (Jiriki tariki no koto), which discusses nembutsu, which promotes the idea that one must rely on the Buddha's power, not on self-power. This text states that doing nenbutsu "while relying on self-power" will not be effective, one must instead rely on other-power." This work was respected by Shinran, who personally made a copy of it by his own hand (this is the only surviving copy today).

The focus on other-power is particularly pronounced in the work of Shinran (親鸞, 1173–1263), the founder of Jōdo Shinshū, who makes other-power a central feature of his thought and soteriology. Indeed, Shinran's worldview is characterized by a radical and absolute focus on other-power and a total rejection of self-power. For his understanding of other-power, Shinran drew on his readings of the Mahayana sutras and the work of Tanluan. For Shinran, one must come to recognize that one is a foolish being (bonbu) who is incapable of reaching Buddhahood through their own efforts and thus abandon the mind of self-power, the calculating (hakarai) mind that relies on the self and its abilities.

Shinran writes "other-power means to be free of any form of calculation," since the person who relies on other-power is naturally supported and influenced by the Buddha's power automatically, without any thinking or effort on their part. Furthermore, it is also a kind of total entrusting of ourselves to the Buddha without doing anything else on our part, or as Shinran writes: "other-power is entrusting ourselves to the primal vow and our birth becoming firmly settled; hence it is altogether without one's own working." Thus, according to Shinran, "in other-power, no working is true working." This effortless and natural working of the Buddha's power, called jinen-hōni (自然法爾, natural working, naturally just so), occurs when we've dropped all judgements and self conceit. This total selfless entrusting in which the Buddha wisdom unfolds spontaneously and naturally (自然, Jp: jinen, Ch: ziran) is also called shinjin.

The relationship between self-power and other-power continued to be debated in the Jōdo Shinshū school. In the Edo period for example, a famous debate occurred between Jinrei (1749-1817) and Ryōshō (1788-1842). Jinrei was much more exclusivist in his understanding of Shinshū as accepting only other-power practice, and thoroughly rejecting all other practices or attitudes as corrupting the other-power focus on the sect. Thus, his view emphasizes the uniqueness of the Shinshū perspective as being a view that rejects anything that is not focused on other-power. Ryōshō meanwhile was more accommodating, seeing other power as all-embracing and universal, even embracing of so-called "self-power" nembutsu practice. For Ryōshō, the self-power vs other-power distinction is something that is ultimately eliminated.

=== In other Japanese Buddhist traditions ===
The idea was also discussed by other Buddhists of the Kamakura period who did not belong to the Pure Land school. For example, the Shingon monk Myōe discusses various ideas of the Buddha's power, such as Buddha-power and the power of the original vow. Another figure outside of the Pure Land tradition which recognized the importance of other-power was the Yogacara monk Jōkei (1155–1213). However, these figures also criticized the Pure Land authors for their exclusive reliance on other-power and the nembutsu, and instead promoted a less exclusive path which relied on typical Mahayana practices along with other power. According to Jōkei, one can make effort in any practice, whether it seems easy or hard, and the Buddha's power will surely be added to it, making it "easy". As such, one need not exclusively rely on any specific practice, since the Buddha's power infuses whatever effort one makes on the path.

In the esoteric Shingon tradition, the idea of the Buddha's power to influence practitioners was discussed since the time of Kūkai (774–835) through the tantric understanding of adhiṣṭhāna. An influential passage in Kūkai's Sokushin jobutsugi (Principle of Attaining Buddhahood with the Present Body) describes the process of adhiṣṭhāna as one in which the Buddha's radiance is reflected in the practitioner's mind:

The word adhiṣṭhāna [Ch: jiachi, 'adding and holding'] demonstrates the universal compassion [that is 'added' by] the tathagatas and the mind of faith [that is held by] beings. Jia, to 'add', means that the radiance of the Buddha reflects in the minds of beings, as the sun reflects in on water. Chi, to 'hold', is when the practitioner perceives the radiance of the Buddha in his mind as though reflected on water.

Shingon authors who wrote on Pure Land practice from an esoteric perspective, like Dōhan, also made use of this idea, and compared it to the Chinese idea of sympathetic resonance while also affirming the ultimate non-duality of Buddha and sentient beings.

== See also ==
- Glossary of Japanese Buddhism
- Synergism and monergism, comparable ideas in Christian theology
