= Miracles of Gautama Buddha =

Supernatural feats and abilities attributed to Gautama Buddha by the Buddhist scriptures

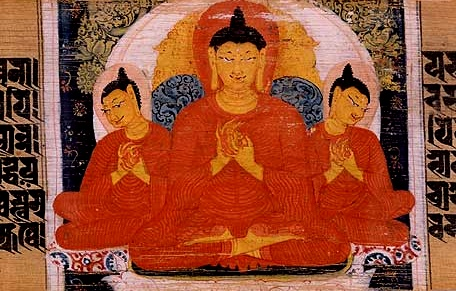
Manuscript painting depicting the Buddha miraculously making duplicates of himself at the Miracle at Savatthi.

The miracles of Gautama Buddha refers to supernatural feats and abilities attributed to Gautama Buddha by the Buddhist scriptures. The feats are mostly attributed to supranormal powers gained through meditation, rather than divine miracles.

Supranormal powers the historic Buddha was recorded to have possessed and exercised include the six higher knowledges (abhiññā): psychic abilities (iddhi-vidhā), clairaudience (dibba-sota), telepathy (ceto-pariya), recollection of one's own past lives (pubbe-nivāsanussati), seeing the past lives and rebirths of others (dibba-cakkhu), and the extinction of mental intoxicants (āsavakkhaya). Miracles found in Mahayana sutras generally play a more direct role in illustrating certain doctrines than miracles found in non-Mahayana Buddhist texts. Apart from texts, several of the miracles are often shown in scenes depicting the Buddha's life in art, and are included in the traditional grouping of The Eight Great Events in the Life of Buddha.

Stories of Gautama Buddha's miracles include miraculous healings, teleportation, creating duplicates of himself, manipulation of the elements, and various other supernatural phenomena. Many of the Buddha's disciples, as well as some non-Buddhist hermits and yogis who attained high states of meditative absorption, were also said to have had some of these same abilities. (Note: Many Buddhist traditions maintain that the first five abhiñña are accessible to non-Buddhists, but not the sixth. However, some schools of Buddhism disagree with this and maintain that only Buddhists can attain supernatural powers gained through meditation, and that non-Buddhists can only gain such powers through things like magic charms.) According to Buddhist texts, the Buddha frequently utilized or discussed these abilities, but spoke of them as an unfavorable method if used by monks to convert the general public, although the Buddha himself also employed the exhibition of supernatural miracles (Pali: iddhi-pātihāriya) as a conversion method. Instead, the Buddha emphasized the "miracle of instruction" (Pali: anusāsanī-pātihāriya), or the teaching of the Dhamma, as the superior method of conversion.

== Pre-Enlightenment ==
Buddhists texts record several instances of miraculous feats happening to Prince Siddhartha prior to his enlightenment as the Buddha.

=== Miraculous birth ===
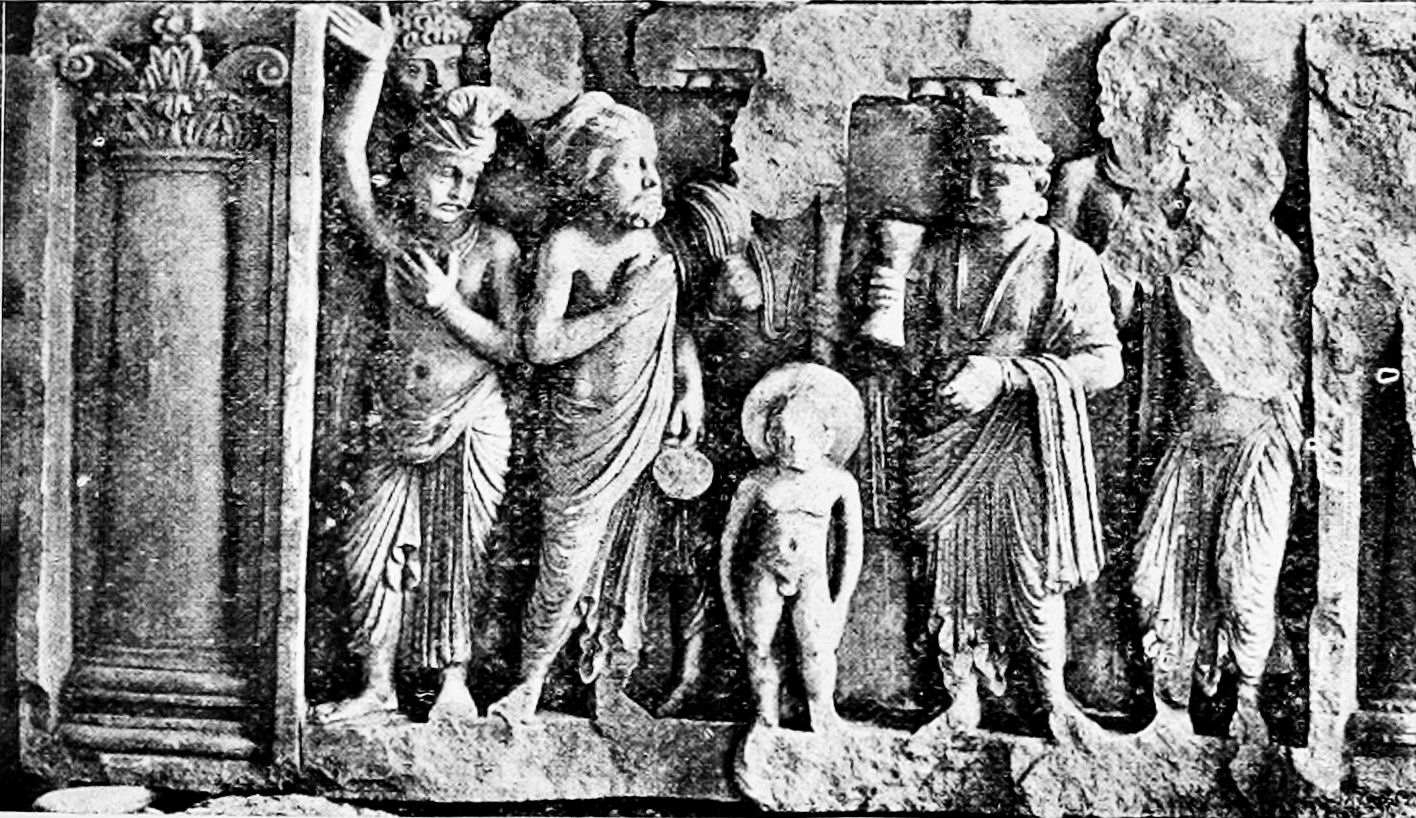
The infant Buddha taking the Seven Steps. Greco-Buddhist art of Gandhara.

It is said that immediately after Gautama's birth, he stood up, took seven steps north, and uttered:

"I am chief of the world,

Eldest in the world. This is the last birth.

There will be [henceforth for me] no more re-becoming."

Furthermore, every place the baby Gautama placed his foot, a lotus flower bloomed.

=== The still shadow ===
One day, when Prince Siddhartha's father took his young son out into a village area for a ploughing festival, his nurses left the would-be Buddha alone under a tree. During the festival, the young prince noticed various sights of suffering, such as laboring men and oxen, and worms and insects being exposed by the ploughing and eaten by birds. Seeing these sights, he then began to meditate under the tree and attain jhana. As time went by, the tree's shadow miraculously stayed in place, sheltering the prince in shade as the sun moved across the sky. In another version of the story, the would-be Buddha fell asleep under the tree during the festival. As time went by and the sun moved across the sky the tree's shadow likewise stayed still, keeping the young prince under the shade for the duration of his nap.

=== The floating hairknot ===
After Prince Siddhartha left the palace, he cut his hair to signify his future life as an ascetic in search of enlightenment. After cutting his hair, the would-be Buddha took hold of his recently cut hairknot and declared "If I am to become a Buddha [an enlightened one], let them stay in the sky; but if not, let them fall to the ground". Throwing the hairknot, it went a distance into the air and then stopped, floating in midair.

=== The golden bowl ===
After giving up extreme asceticism prior to his enlightenment, the would-be Buddha then accepted a meal of rice pudding in a golden bowl from a village girl named Sujata. It is said that when he finished, he took the golden bowl and threw it in the river, declaring, "If I am to attain enlightenment, let this bowl go upstream." The golden bowl then flowed upstream.

== Psychic abilities ==
Following his enlightenment, the Buddha was said to have possessed and discussed several supranormal powers attainable through meditation. Such abilities include walking on water, walking through walls, becoming invisible, levitation, and making copies of himself. The Buddha discusses these abilities in several texts such as the Samaññaphala Sutta (DN 2), Kevatta Sutta (DN 11), Lohicca Sutta (DN 12) and Mahasakuludayi Sutta (MN 77). In the Iddhipada-vibhanga Sutta, the Buddha states:

"When the four bases of spiritual power have been developed and cultivated in this way, a bhikkhu (monk) wields the various kinds of spiritual power: having been one, he becomes many; having been many, he becomes one; he appears and vanishes; he goes unhindered through a wall, through a rampart, through a mountain as though through space; he dives in and out of the earth as though it were water; he walks on water without sinking as though it were earth; seated cross-legged, he travels in space like a bird; with his hands he touches and strokes the moon and sun so powerful and mighty; he exercises mastery with the body as far as the brahmā world."

The Buddha states that such powers like walking through walls, levitation and telepathy can be developed through concentration, but a prerequisite to them is the attainment of the four jhanas, or higher states of meditative absorption. Regardless, the Buddha described most of these powers as being merely mundane. It is only the power of the extinction of the mental defilements (āsavakkhaya) attained by Arahants that was supramundane and leading to the end of suffering.

== Miracles in the Tipitaka ==
The Tipitaka records numerous instances of the Buddha performing miraculous feats after his enlightenment. Religious studies scholar David V. Fiordalis describes the supranormal displays as being useful for initial conversion and functions as evidence for the holiness of the Buddha. The displays are often followed by a Dhamma teaching, which is considered in Buddhism to be the greatest miracle.

=== Hiding Yasa in plain sight ===
Soon after giving his first sermon to the five ascetics who would become the first five Buddhist monks, the Buddha encounters and teaches the young noble Yasa until he attains sotapanna, an early stage of enlightenment. Not seeing his son in the household, Yasa's father later follows his footprints to the Buddha's location. Seeing Yasa's father approaching, the Buddha exercises supranormal powers so that although Yasa is in plain sight, Yasa's father is unable to see him. The Buddha then teaches Yasa's father with Yasa a short distance away, still invisible to his father. This results in Yasa's father becoming the first lay follower of Gautama Buddha and Yasa attaining arahantship, or the highest stage of enlightenment, upon hearing the Buddha's sermon to his father. The Buddha then ceases his supranormal feat and makes Yasa visible to his father again.

=== Subduing the nāga with fire ===
During a visit to the region of Uruvela, the Buddha goes to a hermitage of fire-worshipping ascetics and asks one of its leaders, Uruvela-Kassapa, to stay in the fire-offering chamber. Uruvela-Kassapa warns the Buddha that there is a dangerous nāga living in the chamber, but agrees after the Buddha insists. The Buddha enters the chamber and begins meditating, the nāga then appears and angrily creates smoke. The Buddha responds by entering into a "fire-element" meditation and using his psychic powers to create his own smoke. The nāga then fills the chamber with fire, which the Buddha responds to by bursting into flames and becoming fire. The next morning the Buddha comes out of the chamber with the nāga reduced in size and harmlessly coiled in his alms-bowl. The Buddha later converts Uruvela-Kassapa, his brothers, and the other ascetics in the hermitage.

=== The first twin miracle and the miraculous rain ===
When the Buddha returned to his home kingdom of Kapilavastu following his enlightenment, he levitates and performs a version of what would become known as the Twin Miracle. This results in the Buddha's tribesmen, the Shakya Clan, bowing to him in respect. After the Buddha returns to the ground and sits down it suddenly starts raining, with the rain only falling on people who wanted to get wet, and no rain falling on those who wanted to remain dry. Following this event, the Buddha tells the Vessantara Jātaka.

=== Outpacing Angulimala ===
One day while meditating, the Buddha sees through meditative vision that the serial killer Aṅgulimāla will kill his own mother later that day unless the Buddha intervenes. In order to prevent Aṅgulimāla from committing the grave sin of killing his own mother, the Buddha intercepts him right before he can commit the heinous act and causes the serial killer to go after him instead. As Aṅgulimāla is chasing after him, the Buddha employs supranormal powers so although Aṅgulimāla is running as fast as he can, he cannot catch up with the Buddha, who is walking calmly. One text states the Buddha used his powers to contract and expand the earth, thus keeping a distance with Aṅgulimāla. After a teaching, Aṅgulimāla becomes struck with guilt over his actions as a serial killer and becomes a monk.

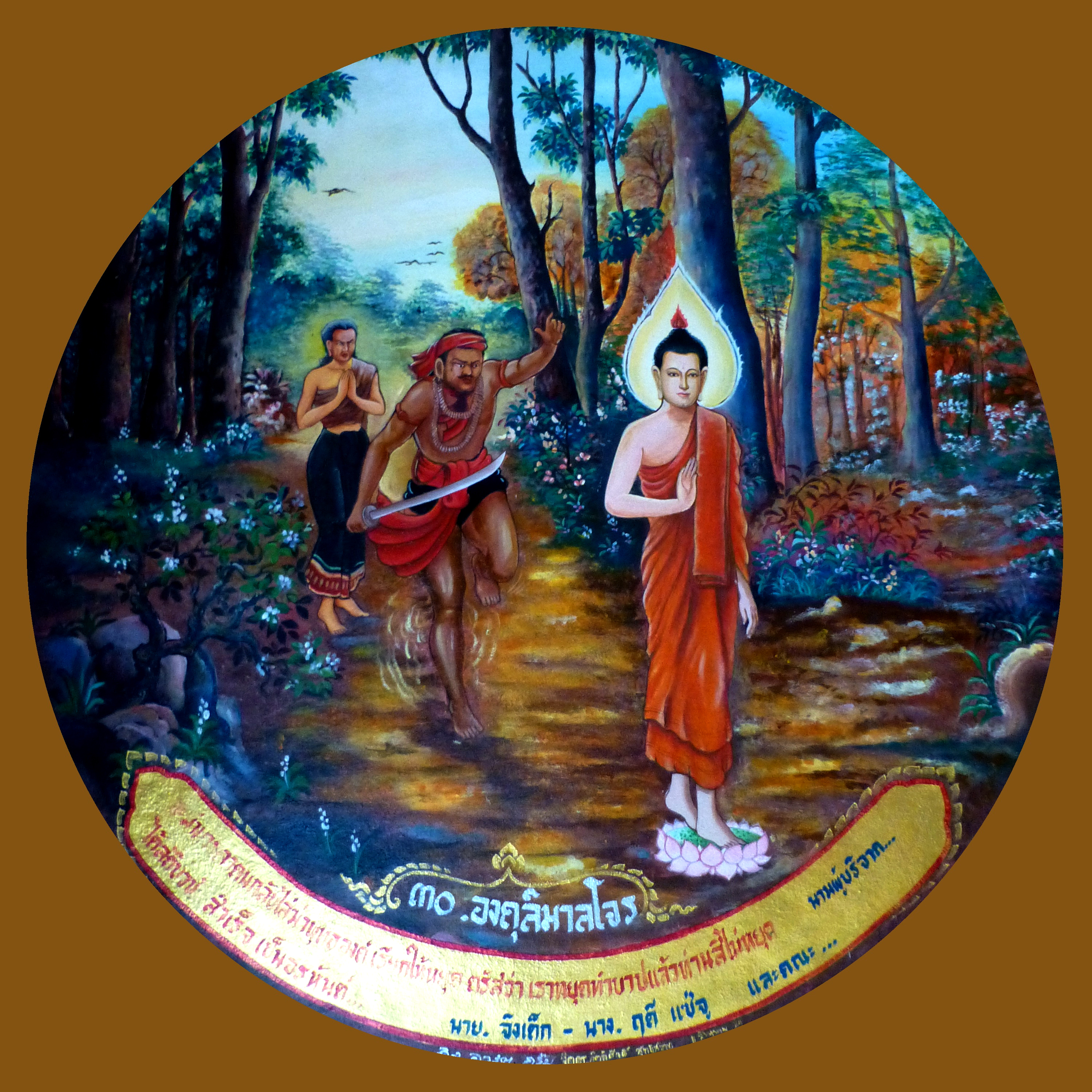
A depiction of Angulimala trying to catch the Buddha at Chedi Traiphop Traimongkhon Temple in Thailand

=== Teaching Khema impermanence ===
The Buddha meets Khema, a beautiful consort of King Bimbisara who would later become one of his chief female disciples. The beautiful woman was disinterested in spiritual matters, given her life of sensual indulgence. So, as the beautiful Khema approaches the Buddha, he uses his psychic powers to conjure up an image of an even more beautiful woman in front of her and then ages the image into an old woman before her very eyes. Khema, who was very vain, then comes to understand the nature of impermanence. The Buddha then preached to her about the impermanence of beauty and the problems of attachment to worldly desires eventually leading her to become a bhikkhuni.

=== Knowing Anathapindika's real name ===
As his future patron Anathapindika approached him for the first time, the Buddha called him by his birth name "Sudatta", which was not known to the public. Surprised to hear his real name, Anathapindika then concluded it could only be the Buddha who was calling him and went forward.

=== The twin miracle at Sāvatthī ===
The Twin Miracle is considered to have been the Buddha's foremost miracle. Unlike some of his other attributed abilities, it said that only Buddhas had the ability to perform the Twin Miracle.

According to Buddhist texts, the Buddha performed the miracle at Sāvatthī after being challenged by a group of six leaders of rival religious sects. The Buddha starts by creating a jeweled walkway in midair, and then emits fire from the top half of his body and water on the lower half and then starts to alternate them. The fire and water then shoot up to illuminate the cosmos while the Buddha teaches the Dhamma to the observers. In one version of the story, he creates several duplicates of himself that fill the air, with some walking, lying down, and sitting. At the conclusion of the miracle, it is the rival religious leaders' turn to perform a miracle but they flee. Following the miracle, the Buddha proceeds to create a single duplicate of himself and then have the duplicate ask him questions which he would answer in order to teach the observing audience.

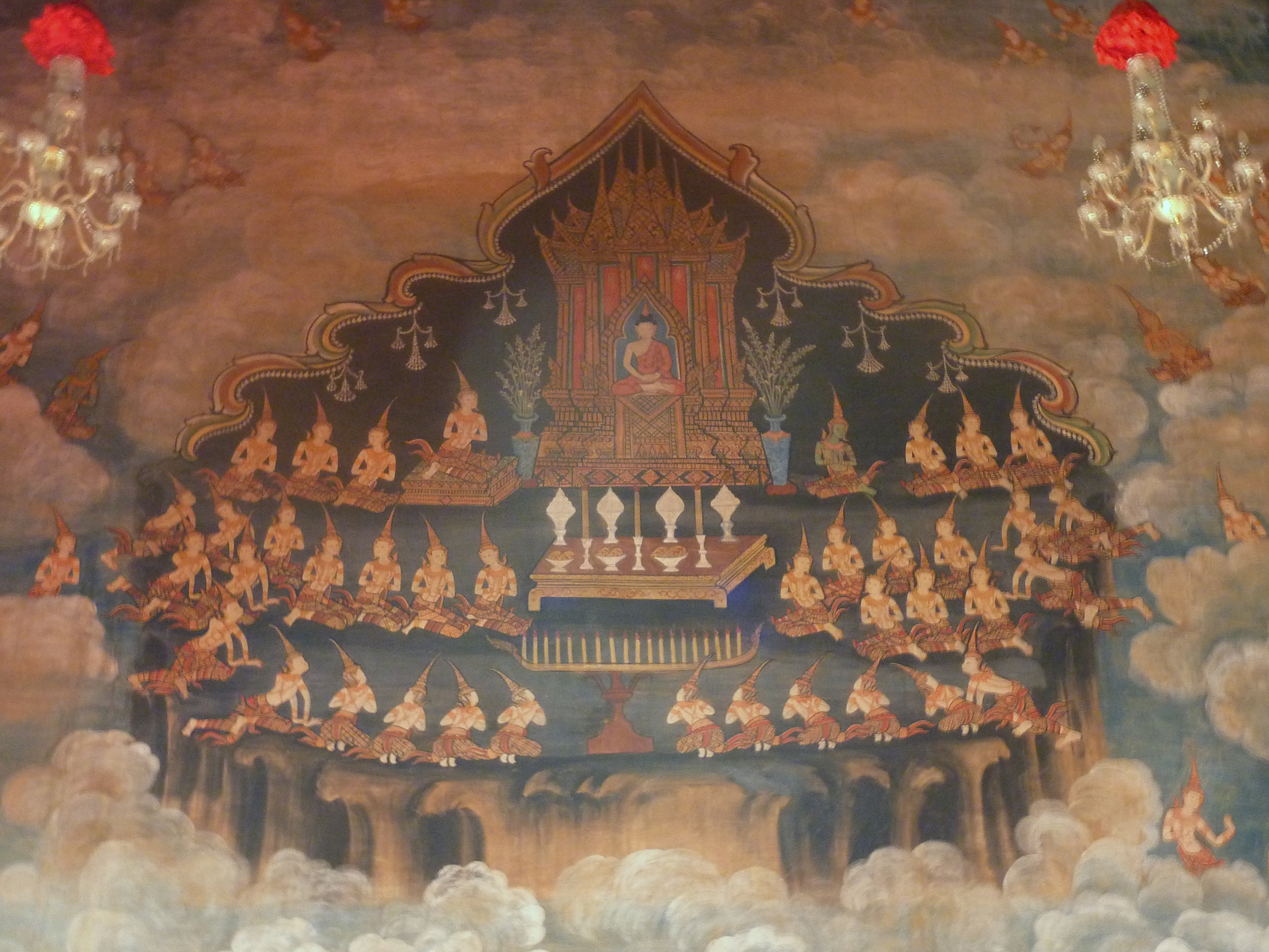
Thai painting depicting the Buddha preaching to devas in Tavatimsa heaven.

=== Ascending to heaven and creating a duplicate ===
The Buddha ascends to Tavatimsa Heaven to preach the Abhidhamma to his deceased mother. He recites the Abhidhamma to the devas for the full rains-retreat without stopping, taking a break every day to go on alms-round and eat. During the daily lunch hour, the Buddha creates a duplicate of himself and orders it to preach in his place while he is away.

=== Descent from heaven at Sankassa ===
Following the Buddha's visit to Tavatimsa Heaven, it is said that he descended to earth at the city of Sankassa. Texts relate that the deva king Sakka created three staircases for the Buddha's descent, one gold, one crystal, and one silver. The Buddha was said to have made the descent on the crystal staircase in the middle, with devas descending on the gold staircase on the left and brahma beings descending on the silver staircase on the right. During the descent it is said that humans and various beings in Buddhist cosmology were able to see each other. A shrine was erected at the site the Buddha was said to have set his right foot upon reaching the earth. According to English classicist Edward J. Thomas, Chinese pilgrims who visited the site a few centuries later reported that the staircases had nearly sunken completely into the ground by the time they visited the site.

=== Levitating over the Rohini river ===
One day, while surveying the world with his psychic powers, the Buddha sees that a war is about to break out between the Shakya clan and a neighboring kingdom. The region was in drought and the two kingdoms were on the verge of fighting so that they could divert the water from the Rohini River for their own use. As the two armies gather on opposite sides of the river, the Buddha sets off by air to stop them and appears before them, levitating over the river. The Buddha then asks the rulers of each side if water or human life is more valuable. When each side replies that human life is more valuable the Buddha persuades them to make a deal to share the water.

=== Teleporting across the Ganges ===
The Mahaparinibbana Sutta recounts a story of the Buddha and his monks crossing the Ganges River by disappearing and reappearing on the other side, rather than searching for boats or creating rafts as other people were doing.

=== Challenging the Brahma being ===
In the Brahma-nimantanika Sutta, the Brahma being Baka had become deluded into thinking that he was immortal and that he had attained the highest state. The Buddha then travels to the Brahma realm of Buddhist cosmology to correct Baka's views by displaying various powers such as identifying realms the Brahma was not aware of, identifying Mara whenever he possessed a member of Baka's assembly, identifying the full extent of Baka's abilities, and making himself invisible to Baka Brahma and his assembly to prove that the Buddha's powers were greater than Baka Brahma's.

=== Neutralizing the Gandhara Charm ===
In a Pali commentary, the ascetic Pilindavaccha was in possession of the "Lesser Gandhāra Charm" (Pali: cūḷagandhāravijjā) which allowed him to levitate and read minds. However, after the Buddha attained enlightenment, Pilindavaccha finds that his powers no longer worked. Pilindavaccha then goes to the Buddha thinking he was in possession of a greater charm. Instead, Pilindavaccha ends up becoming a monk under the Buddha and attains arahantship. According to religion scholar Knut A. Jacobsen, the story suggests that the Buddha's presence was said to neutralize lesser magic, lesser magic being powers not attained through meditation.

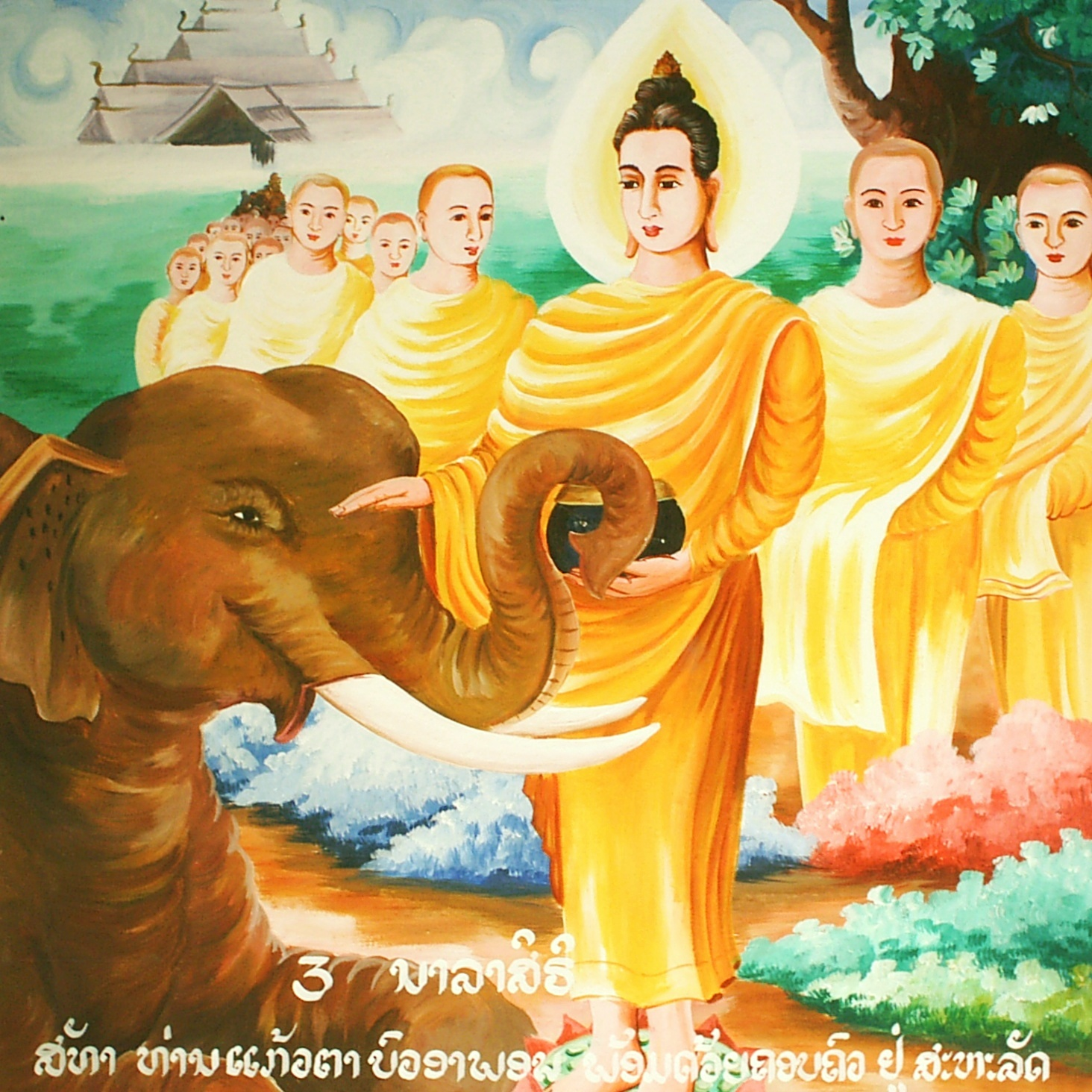
Depiction of the Buddha taming Nalagiri at a Laotian temple.

=== Taming the drunken elephant ===
The Buddha's jealous cousin Devadatta sets loose the drunken elephant, Nalagiri, to trample the Buddha. In one account of the story, when Nalagiri charged at the Buddha, the Buddha created an image of two lions and a sea of fire in front of the elephant to frighten it into staying still. In another account, the Buddha created a roar resembling that of an elephant queen, which caused Nalagiri to stop and bow to the Buddha. In one version of the story, the monk Ananda tries to protect the Buddha by jumping in front of him. The Buddha orders Ananda to move but he refuses. The Buddha then employs psychic powers to move Ananda to safety. Afterwards, the Buddha gently tames the elephant with loving-kindness.

=== The miraculous healing ===
The faithful laywoman Suppiyā had promised to provide meat to an ailing monk. After realizing there was no meat available at the market that day, she cut some flesh from her own thigh to make the offering and hid her injury. Knowing what had happened, the Buddha asked Suppiyā be brought to him. Upon seeing the Buddha, Suppiyā's wound healed, with the laywoman's flesh returning to what it was before with no scarring. Afterwards, the Buddha sets a rule forbidding his monks from accepting offerings of human flesh.

=== Putting out the forest fire ===
The Buddha was walking through the forests of Magadha with a large assembly of monks when a large forest fire breaks out. While monks that had not attained any stages of enlightenment panicked, the enlightened monks of the assembly remained calm and told the unenlightened monks of the assembly that there is nothing to fear when walking with the Buddha. The monks then gather around the Buddha, who had stopped at the sight of the fire. As the fire rages toward them, the fire miraculously extinguishes whenever the flames approached a distance of 16 lengths around the Buddha. The Buddha credits this feat to an act of Sacca-kiriya, or a solemn declaration of truth, he made in a past life and then tells the Vattaka Jataka.

=== Attempting to save the Shakyas ===
While surveying the world with his psychic powers, the Buddha sees that the Shakya clan is about to be massacred by King Virudhaka of Kosala, who had a grudge against them from childhood. According to some versions of the story, the Buddha intercepts King Virudhaka once and convinces him to turn back, but the king later changes his mind and continues the invasion. In other versions of the story, the Buddha intercepts King Virudhaka two times, and in some versions three times before ceasing to intervene in the next attempt. When the Buddha does not intervene, Moggallana, one of the Buddha's disciples, offers to save the Shakya clan using his own psychic powers but the Buddha discourages this, stating that the massacre is the result of the Shakyas' past karma and that no amount of supernatural powers can stop the power of karma. Regardless, Moggallana attempts to save some Shakyas by using his powers to move several hundred of them to safety, only to find that they had died anyway. (Note: In some versions of the story, the point is proven with the Buddha doing this himself instead of Moggallana.) According to one source, the karma that caused this massacre was that in a past life, the people of the Sakya clan had collectively poisoned the river of an enemy city-state. Following the massacre, the Buddha predicts that King Virudhaka will die in fire in seven days. Upon hearing about this, King Virudhaka builds a house on the water to live on for seven days. On the last day, a fire starts from sunlight hitting a magnifying glass on a cushion and burns down the house, killing King Virudhaka.

== Miracles in Mahayana Sutras ==
Miracles generally play a larger role in Mahayana Buddhism than in Theravada Buddhism, with miracles often being used to directly illustrate specific Mahayana doctrines. The miracles found in Mahayana sutras typically have much more symbolism and put more emphasis on the direct use of supranormal powers to teach and help other living beings.

=== Showing the Buddha field ===
In the Vimalakirti Sutra, the Buddha performs a miracle to display the "Buddha field" to people on earth. He does this to show the purity of mind bodhisattvas must attain to reach Buddhahood. Various bodhisattvas from the sutra then take over the narrative and perform various supernatural feats such as switching bodies, magically transporting objects and transformation in order to teach about Mahayana concepts such as non-duality. In the sutra, Vimalakirti states that all buddhas possess a divine eye that lets them see all of the other buddhas' lands.

=== Shaking the Earth and bringing light ===
In the Lotus Sutra, the Buddha shakes the earth and brings forth a ray of light which illuminates thousands of "Buddha-fields" in the east. According to the bodhisattva Manjusri from the Sutra, the single ray of light represents that the various practices and paths of Mahayana Buddhism can be met with a consistent meaning throughout the cosmos. The light also symbolizes the equivalence of all the buddhas. Manjusri points out in the Sutra that he recognized the light from a previous buddha who performed the same feat in the distant past and that the feat shows that Gautama Buddha is about to expound his ultimate teaching.

=== Levitating across the Ganges ===
In the Lalitavistara Sūtra, shortly after his enlightenment the Buddha heads to Varanasi to deliver his first sermon. As he reaches the Ganges River he approaches a ferryman to cross the river, who demands he pay the fee to cross the river. The Buddha responds by saying that he has no money on him and proceeds to cross the river through levitation.

== Buddhist view on miracles ==
Most of the Buddha's miracles are seen in Buddhism as being the result of extraordinary psychic abilities gained through advanced meditation, rather than miraculous powers. According to Buddhist texts many of the Buddha's disciples, as well as some non-Buddhist hermits and yogis who attained high meditative states, also had some of these same abilities. (Note: Fifth century Buddhist commentator Buddhaghosa states in the Visuddhimagga that only the Buddha and certain eminent disciples and saints attained such powers right upon enlightenment, due to their extraordinary merit. For most practitioners, it is necessary to practice specific meditation techniques for long periods to attain such supranormal abilities, according to Buddhaghosa.) While texts state that the Buddha still utilized supranormal powers at times and that they are considered signs of spiritual progress, the Buddha also described them as dangerous and something that could lead to self-glorification. According to one text, when the Buddha encountered a non-Buddhist ascetic who proudly showed off his ability to cross a river by walking on water (an ability the Buddha was also said to have had), the Buddha rebuked him and said the ascetic's feat was worth little more than the few cents it cost to cross the river by ferry. In the Buddhist monastic code, the Buddha laid down a rule forbidding his monks from showing off supranormal powers to laypeople and compares conversion through such powers unfavorably with converting through teaching.

In the Kevatta Sutta, the Buddha describes there being three types of miracles: the miracle of psychic powers, the miracle of telepathy, and the miracle of instruction. While the Buddha acknowledged the existence of the first two miracles, he stated a skeptical person could mistake them for magic charms or cheap magic tricks. Instead, the Buddha praised the "miracle of instruction" as the superior miracle. According to the Kevatta Sutta, the miracle of instruction can lead the observer to harmlessness, virtue, and meditation; and can even eventually lead observers to the attainment of the powers of the first two miracles for themselves.

== See also ==
- Abhijñā
- Bodhipakkhiyādhammā
- Dhyāna in Buddhism
- Four Right Exertions
- Iddhi
- Iddhipāda
- Kevatta Sutta
- Miracles of Jesus
- Miracles of Muhammad
