= Iddhipada =

Compound term composed of power, potency, base, basis or constituent

Iddhipāda (Pali; Skt. ṛddhipāda) is a compound term composed of "power" or "potency" (iddhi; ṛddhi) and "base," "basis" or "constituent" (pāda). In Buddhism, the "power" referred to by this compound term is a group of spiritual powers. Thus, this compound term is usually translated along the lines of "base of power" or "base of spiritual power." In the Buddhist pursuit of bodhi (awakening, understanding) and liberation, the associated spiritual powers are secondary to the four "base" mental qualities that achieve such powers. These four base mental qualities are: concentration on intention; concentration on effort; concentration on consciousness; and, concentration on investigation. These four base mental qualities are used to develop wholesome mental states and rid oneself of unwholesome mental states.

In traditional Buddhist literature, this set of four mental qualities is one of the seven sets of qualities lauded by the Buddha as conducive to Enlightenment (bodhipakkhiyādhammā).

== Canonical analysis ==
In the Pali Canon, a major source of information on the iddhipāda is in the Samyutta Nikaya, ch. 51, entitled, "Connected Discourses on the Bases for Spiritual Power" (Iddhipāda-saṃyutta).

=== Four components ===
In the "Neglected" discourse (Viraddha Sutta, SN 51.2), it states:

"Bhikkhus, those who have neglected the four bases for spiritual power have neglected the noble path leading to the complete destruction of suffering. Those who have undertaken the four bases for spiritual power have undertaken the noble path leading to the destruction of suffering."

The four bases of such power are concentration (samādhi) due to:

- Intention or purpose or desire or zeal (chanda)
- Effort or energy or will (viriya)
- Consciousness or mind or thoughts (citta)
- Investigation or discrimination (vīmaṃsā; Skt: mīmāṃsā)

=== Corequisites: concentration and striving ===
In most canonical discourses these four bases of power are developed in tandem with "volitional formations of striving" (padhāna-saṅkhāra). For instance, in the "Concentration due to Desire" discourse (Chandasamādhi Sutta, SN 51.13), it states:

Bhikkhus, if a bhikhu gains concentration, gains one-pointedness of mind based upon desire, this is called concentration due to desire. He generates desire for the nonarising of unarisen evil unwholesome states; he makes an effort, arouses energy, applies his mind, and strives. He generates desire for the abandoning of arisen evil unwholesome states ... for the arising of unarisen wholesome states ... for the maintenance of arisen wholesome states ...; he makes an effort, arouses energy, applies his mind and strives. These are called volitional formations of striving. Thus this desire and this concentration due to desire and these volitional formations of striving: this is called the basis for spiritual power that possesses concentration due to desire and volitional formations of striving.

This discourse similarly analyzes the latter three bases of powers as well.

=== Associated spiritual powers ===
In terms of the spiritual powers associated with the development of these bases, the "Before" Discourse (Pubba Sutta, SN 51.11) states:

When the four bases of spiritual power have been developed and cultivated in this way, a bhikkhu wields the various kinds of spiritual power: having been one, he becomes many; having been many, he becomes one; he appears and vanishes; he goes unhindered through a wall, through a rampart, through a mountain as though through space; he dives in and out of the earth as though it were water; he walks on water without sinking as though it were earth; seated cross-legged, he travels in space like a bird; with his hands he touches and strokes the moon and sun so powerful and mighty; he exercises mastery with the body as far as the brahmā world.

== See also ==
- Abhijna – six types of higher spiritual knowledge found in the Pali Canon.
- Bodhipakkhiyādhammā – seven sets of 37 mental qualities conducive to Enlightenment
- Four Right Exertions – four aspects of "volitional formations of striving"
- Iddhi – spiritual powers discussed in canonical Buddhism
- Kevatta Sutta
