= Iddhi =

Technical term in Buddhist doctrine and practice

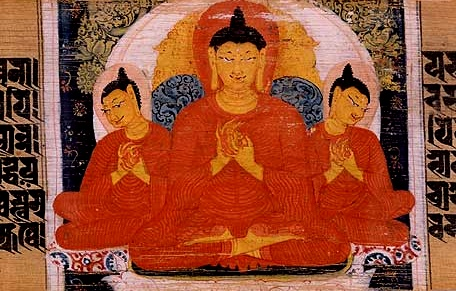
"Miracle at Śrāvastī." From a Prajñāpāramitā palm leaf manuscript. Nalanda, Bihar, India

Iddhi (Pali; Sanskrit: ṛddhi) in Buddhism refers to "psychic powers", one of the six supranormal powers (abhijñā) attained by advanced meditation through the four dhyānas. The main sense of the word seems to be "potency".

== List of iddhi powers ==
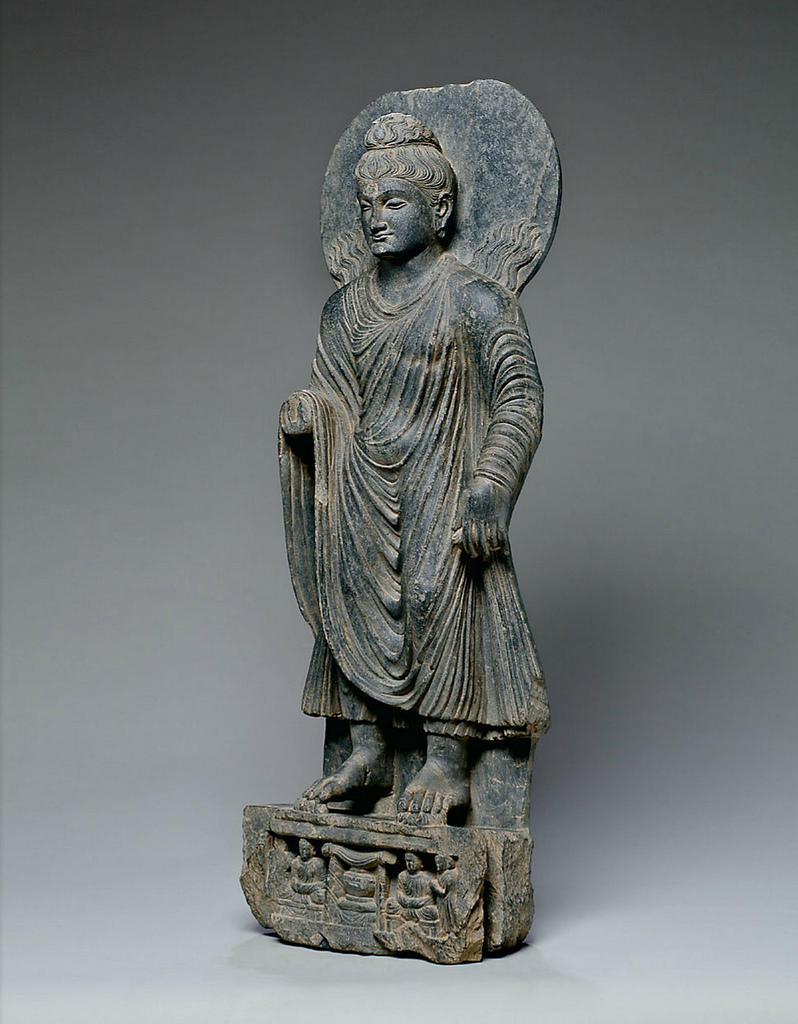
Statue of Buddha performing the Miracle at Śrāvastī, with flames above his shoulders. Gandhara, 100-200 CE

According to Bowker, there are eight iddhi powers:

1. Replicate and project bodily images of oneself,
2. Make oneself invisible,
3. Pass through solid objects,
4. Sink into solid ground,
5. Walk on water in any oceans, rivers, etc,
6. Fly,
7. Touch the Sun and Moon with one's hand,
8. Ascend to the world of the god Brahmā in the highest heavens (Size alternation)

According to the Iddhipada-vibhanga Sutta (SN 51.20):

1. Having been one he becomes many; having been many he becomes one.
2. He appears. He vanishes.
3. He goes unimpeded through walls, ramparts, & mountains as if through space.
4. He dives in and out of the Earth as if it were water.
5. He walks on water without sinking as if it were dry land.
6. Sitting crosslegged he flies through the air like a winged bird.
7. With his hand he touches & strokes even the sun & moon or any space objects, so mighty & powerful.
8. He exercises influence with his body even as far as the Akaniṣṭha Brahmā world.

In the book Great Disciples of the Buddha by Nyanaponika Thera and Hellmuth Hecker, there are several additional powers described.

1. The Divine Eye (Clairvoyance)- this power allows one to see all beings in other realms whole existence as well as see the three periods of time known as past, present & future
2. The Divine Ear (Clairaudience)- can hear any sound effects from infinite space
3. Travel by Mind-Made Body (Astral Travel)
4. Travel with the Physical Body to any other place (Realms & dimensions)
5. Telekinesis (Supernormal Locomotion)
6. Flying
7. The power of Transformation
8. The ability to replicate one's body
9. Penetration of others' minds (Thought Reading)
10. Passing through solid objects
11. Diving in and out of the Earth as if through water
12. Walking on water
13. Touching the sun and the moon with one's fingers
14. Becoming invisible
15. Recollection of past lives (some would call this a power, some would call it true knowledge)

== See also ==
- Abhijñā
- Siddhi
- Bodhipakkhiyādhammā
- Buddhist paths to liberation
- Dhyāna in Buddhism
- Four Right Exertions
- Iddhipada
- Kevatta Sutta
- Levitation (paranormal)
- Miracles of Lord Buddha
- Samatha
- Vipassanā

== Sources ==
- Saletore, Rajaram Narayan (1981). Indian Witchcraft. Abhinav Publications. ISBN 978-81-7017-146-1.
- Schober, Juliane (2002), Sacred Biography in the Buddhist Traditions of South and South-East Asia, Motilal Banarsidass Publ.
- Pio, Edwina (1988), Buddhist Psychology: A Modern Perspective, Abhinav Publications, ISBN 978-81-7017-246-8
