= Robert H. Sharf =

Robert H. Sharf is a Canadian scholar of Buddhism and East Asian religions, currently serving as D. H. Chen Distinguished Professor of Buddhist Studies in the Department of East Asian Languages and Cultures at the University of California, Berkeley. He is also Founder and Chair of Berkeley's Numata Center for Buddhist Studies.

== Biography ==
He was born in Toronto, Canada. Sharf earned a B.A. in Religious Studies in 1979 and an M.A. in Chinese Studies in 1981 from the University of Toronto. He pursued his doctoral studies in Buddhist Studies at the University of Michigan, receiving his Ph.D. in 1991. During his doctoral training, Sharf spent time as a research fellow at Kyoto University (1985–1987), affiliated with the Institute for Research into the Humanities (Jinbun Kagaku Kenkyūjo). He began his academic teaching as a lecturer (1989–1990) and assistant professor (1990–1994) at McMaster University, and associate professor in the Department of Asian Languages and Cultures at the University of Michigan (1995–2003). At Michigan he held the Arthur F. Thurnau Professorship from 2002 to 2003.

At the University of California, Berkeley, Sharf holds the D. H. Chen Distinguished Professorship in Buddhist Studies and founded the Center in 2004. He has served as Chair of the Center since its founding and will continue in this role until 2026, when he is scheduled to step down.

== Research and scholarly work ==
Sharf's scholarship is centrally concerned with medieval Chinese Buddhism particularly Chan/Zen and with the ritual, institutional, artistic, and philosophical contexts that shape East Asian Buddhist traditions. His research repeatedly challenges reductive or ahistorical readings of Buddhism, arguing instead for close attention to texts, liturgy, monastic institutions, and the rhetorical uses of doctrinal categories. Sharf combines philological reading of primary sources with ethnographic and ritual studies methods, and his work is marked by an insistence that interpretive claims about Buddhism be grounded in historically situated evidence.

A recurring theme in Sharf's writing is a critique of what has been called “Buddhist modernism.” He has shown how modern and Western conceptual frameworks—especially those that valorize interior, private experience have shaped both popular and academic understandings of Buddhism.

Sharf's monograph, Coming to Terms with Chinese Buddhism: A Reading of the Treasure Store Treatise (2002), exemplifies his textually grounded approach. In this study he reads a key eighth-century doctrinal text in its historical and intellectual context to show how normative claims about Buddhist thought develop in relation to institutional needs and hermeneutical strategies. Complementing this monograph, his co-edited volume Living Images: Japanese Buddhist Icons in Context (2001) brings together art-historical, ritual, and textual perspectives to situate iconography within monastic practice and liturgy rather than treating icons as isolated aesthetic objects.

His doctoral and postdoctoral research included extended research fellowships in Japan (Institute for Research into the Humanities, Kyoto University) and on-site fieldwork at Kōfukuji in Nara, work that informed later studies of monastic ritual, iconography, and institutional history.

Sharf has also addressed philosophical and conceptual questions in Buddhist thought, including topics in Buddhist epistemology, theories of mind and consciousness, and debates about insentience and nirvāṇa. Sharf is a co-author of What Can't Be Said: Paradox and Contradiction in East Asian Thought, published by Oxford University Press in 2021. His book examines classical texts such as the Daodejing and Zhuangzi, as well as Buddhist writings from the Sanlun, Tiantai, Chan, and Zen traditions, culminating in the Kyoto School of philosophy.

In his individual scholarship, Sharf has also addressed the relationship between nirvāṇa and insentience. In his 2014 paper, "Is Nirvāṇa the Same as Insentience? Chinese Struggles with an Indian Buddhist Ideal," Sharf examines early Buddhist and Chinese Buddhist interpretations of nirvāṇa, particularly the distinction between nirvāṇa and states of mindlessness or insentience.

He has explored intersections between Buddhist thought and quantum mechanics. In his 2021 paper, "The Looping Structure of Buddhist Thought: How Chan Buddhism Resolves the Quantum Measurement Problem", Sharf examines how Chan Buddhist concepts may offer insights into the quantum measurement problem, suggesting parallels between Buddhist philosophical frameworks and quantum mechanics.

== Selected publications ==
=== Books ===
- Garfield, Jay L.; Heim, Maria; Sharf, Robert H. (2025-01-28). How to Lose Yourself: An Ancient Guide to Letting Go. Ancient Wisdom for Modern Readers Series. Princeton: Princeton University Press. ISBN 978-0-691-25309-1.
- Sharf, Robert H. (2022). Ji, Yun (ed.). "Xiafu Chanxue zixuan ji 夏復禪學自選集 (Selected essays on Chan studies by Robert Sharf)". Hualin Translation Series on Buddhist Studies 5. Singapore: World Scholastic Publishers. ISBN 978-981-17276-2-7.
- Sharf, Robert H. (2023-09-22). "Xiafu Mijiao yanjiu zixuan ji 夏復密教研究自選集 (Selected essays on Esoteric Buddhism by Robert Sharf)". Hualin Translation Series on Buddhist Studies 6. Singapore: World Scholastic Publishers.
- Deguchi, Yasuo; Garfield, Jay L.; Priest, Graham; Sharf, Robert H. (2021). What can't be said: paradox and contradiction in East Asian thought. New York, NY, United States of America: Oxford University Press. ISBN 978-0-19-752618-7.
- Sharf, Robert H. (2002). Coming to Terms with Chinese Buddhism: A Reading of the Treasure Store Treatise. University of Hawai'i Press. ISBN 978-0-8248-2443-3.

=== Edited books ===
- McRae, John R. (2023). Sharf, Robert H.; McRae, John R. (eds.). Zen Evangelist: Shenhui, Sudden Enlightenment, and the Southern School of Chan Buddhism. Kuroda Series. University of Hawaii Press. ISBN 9780824895624.
- Sharf, Robert H.; Sharf, Elizabeth Horton, eds. (2001). Living images: Japanese Buddhist icons in context. ARC: Asian religions & cultures. Stanford, Calif: Stanford University Press. ISBN 978-0-8047-3989-4.

=== Journal articles and book chapters ===
- Sharf, Robert (2025-01-01). "The Dao of Ānanda: A Reflection on Siddhārtha's Austerities". Sacred Texts and Iconographies Relating the Life of the Buddha.
- Sharf, Robert H. (2023), "The Curious Case of the Conscious Corpse: A Medieval Buddhist Thought Experiment", in Coseru, Christian (ed.), Reasons and Empty Persons: Mind, Metaphysics, and Morality: Essays in Honor of Mark Siderits, Cham: Springer International Publishing, pp. 121–140, doi:10.1007/978-3-031-13995-6_7, ISBN 978-3-031-13995-6
- Sharf, Robert H (2021-06-26). "The Looping Structure of Buddhist Thought (Or, How Chan Buddhism Resolves the Quantum Measurement Problem)". Journal of the American Academy of Religion. 89 (3): 1039–1073. doi:10.1093/jaarel/lfab029. ISSN 0002-7189.
- Sharf, Robert H. (2018). "What Do Nanquan and Schrödinger Have Against Cats?". Representations. 144 (1): 154–165. doi:10.1525/rep.2018.144.1.154. ISSN 0734-6018. Archived from the original on 2024-03-01.
- Sharf, Robert H. "Knowing Blue: Ābhidharmika Accounts of the Immediacy of Sense Perception". Buddhist Philosophy of Consciousness.
- Robert H. Sharf (2017). "Buddha-nature, Critical Buddhism, and Early Chan". 불교학리뷰. null (22): 105–150. doi:10.29213/crbs..22.201712.105. ISSN 1975-2660.
- Sharf, Robert H. (1993). "The Zen of Japanese Nationalism". History of Religions. 33 (1): 1–43. doi:10.1086/463354. ISSN 0018-2710.
- Foulk, T.; Sharf, Robert (1993). "On the Ritual Use of Ch'an Portraiture in Medieval China". Cahiers d'Extrême-Asie. 7 (1): 149–219. doi:10.3406/asie.1993.1064.
