= The Twin Miracle =

Miracles performed by the Buddha, based on Buddhist texts

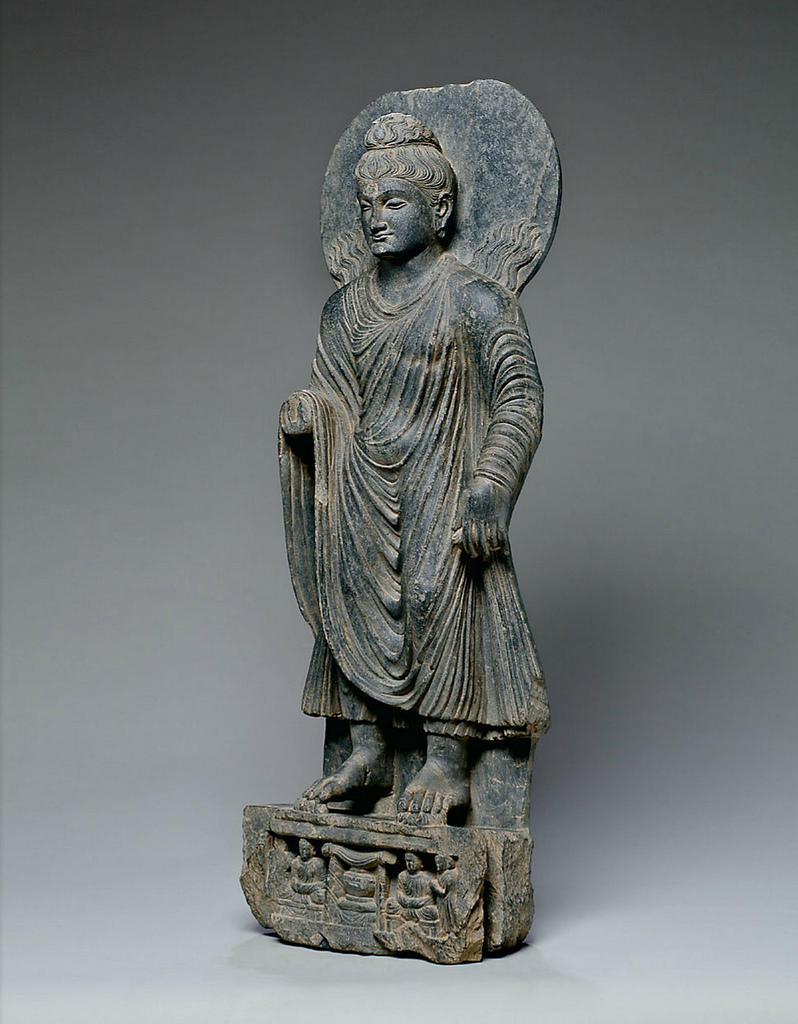
The Buddha performs the Twin Miracle, with water pouring from his feet and flames exiting from his shoulders.

The Twin Miracle, also called the Miracle at Savatthi (Pali), or the Miracle at Śrāvastī (Sanskrit), is one of the miracles of Gautama Buddha. There are two major versions of the story that vary in some details. The Pali account of the miracle can be found in the Dhammapadattakatha and the Sanskrit version of the Miracle Month in the Pratiharya-sutra. Buddhists believe it was performed seven years after the Buddha's enlightenment, in the ancient Indian city of Savatthi. Tibetan Buddhists celebrate this event with Chotrul Duchen.

According to Buddhist texts, during the twin miracle the Buddha emitted fire from the top half of his body and water from the bottom half of his body simultaneously, before alternating them and then expanding them to illuminate the cosmos. The miracle was performed during a miracle contest between Gautama Buddha and six rival religious teachers. In the Sanskrit Buddhist tradition, it is considered one of the Ten Indispensable Acts that all Buddhas are to perform during their lives, and one of the "Thirty Great Acts" in the Pali commentarial tradition. The miracle itself is said to have been performed twice, with the Buddha performing it once at his home town of Kapilavastu before performing the main miracle at Savatthi. It is considered to have been Gautama Buddha's greatest miracle and something that can only be performed by fully enlightened Buddhas.

== The Miracle at Kapilavastu ==
According to Buddhist texts, when the Buddha returned to his home kingdom of Kapilavastu following his enlightenment, his fellow tribesman refused to bow to him because he was a junior member of the tribe. In order to ensure that they paid him proper respect as an enlightened one, the Buddha levitates and emits water and fire from his body and alternates their positions. This results in the Buddha's father, King Suddhodana, bowing to him in respect, with the rest of the Shakya Tribe following suit. After the Buddha returns to the ground and sits down it suddenly starts raining, with the rain only falling on people who wanted to get wet, and no rain falling on those who wanted to remain dry. Following this event, the Buddha tells the Vessantara Jātaka.

== The Twin Miracle at Sravasti ==
=== Background ===
According to the Pali version of the story, during the Buddha's retreat in the Bamboo Grove at Rajagriha, a wealthy treasurer suspended a sandalwood bowl in the air with a cord, hoping to find an enlightened being who can fly up and take it. For six days, teachers from six other spiritual groups attempted to talk the treasurer into giving them the bowl, but failed. On the seventh day, news of this reached two of the Buddha's disciples, Moggaliana and Pindola Bharadvaja, as they were begging for alms. Bharavaja proceeded to fly up and take the bowl, continue his rounds, and by thus converting the treasurer and his family to Buddhism. While on his way back to the monastery, he was asked by people who missed the miracle to perform it again, which he did.

When the Buddha hears about this, he reprimands Bharadvaja for doing this, and lays down a rule forbidding monks from using supranormal powers for such purposes. Upon hearing that the Buddha forbid his monks from displaying miracles, the six rival teachers try to win back followers by publicly challenging the Buddha to a miracle tournament, thinking he would refuse to perform one.

In the Sanskrit account of the event, the sandalwood bowl story is absent. Instead, King Bimbisara's younger brother held a feast in honour of the king in Rajagriha. King Bimbisara's teacher was the Buddha while the prince's teachers were the six jealous teachers. At the feast, the Buddha subtly displayed his powers during the feast ceremony and illustrated that the six teachers were not qualified, and gave a teaching to the guests according to each of their minds after which their understanding of the Buddhist doctrines greatly increased. All of the people in Rajagriha then became followers of the Buddha. The six teachers angrily went away and became vengeful. Confident in their own supranormal powers, they challenged the Buddha to a miracle contest on their own accord in hopes of regaining followers.

The challenge was delivered in King Bimbisara's kingdom at Rajagriha, and accepted by the Buddha who then effectively pressured the six teachers to follow him in his journeys to Sravasti through northern India's kingdoms, if they wished for a contest of miracles.

=== The Miracle Tournament ===
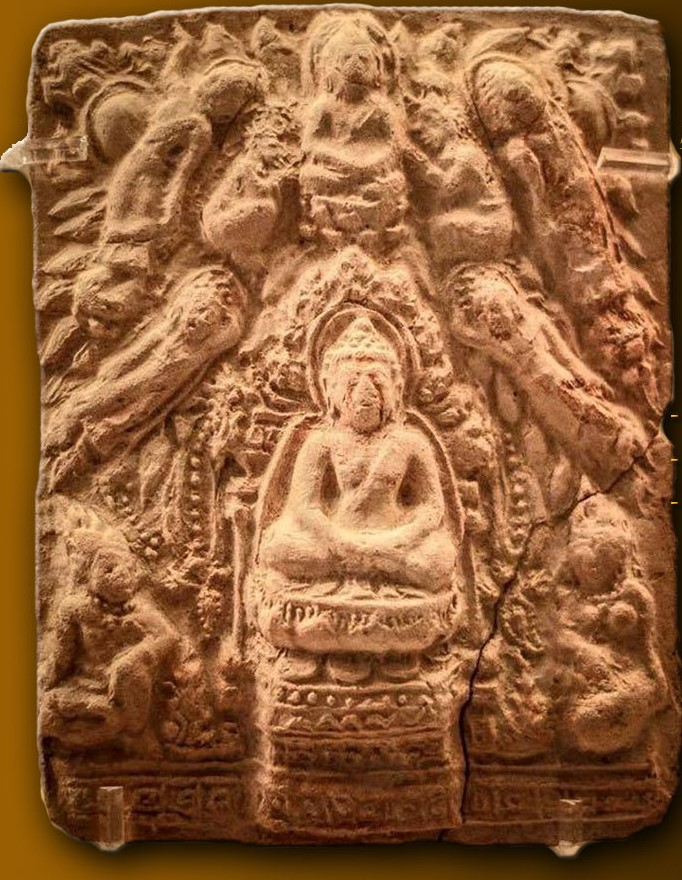
Thai amulet showing the twin miracle

According to the Pali recording, the six jealous teachers go to King Bimbisara of Magadha to sponsor the contest. To the rival teachers' surprise, the Buddha accepts the challenge, stating that the rule forbidding miracles applied to his monks but not to him, in the same way that subjects are forbidden from picking fruit from the royal orchard, but not the king himself. Sravasti is chosen as the place where the miracles will be performed since the Twin Miracle is always performed there by the Buddhas, for a date four months later.

In the Sanskrit recording of the story, the rival teachers go first to King Bimbasara to host the contest but are turned down. As the Buddha enters different kingdoms on his journey to Sravasti, each time the six teachers ask the local kings to tender their challenge to the Buddha: The Licchavi kingdom at Vaisali; King Udrayana at Kausambi; King Shun Tsin at War; King Bhramadata at Tigitsashiri; his own Sakya kingdom at Kapila; and, then to the kingdom at Sravasti. Each time the Buddha accepts the challenge and continues on to the chosen location, while the kings and people of the regions through which the Buddha passed follow.

Finally when the Buddha enters Sravasti, the six teachers go to the local King Pasenadi of Kosala who laughs at the idea of the six teachers competing with the Buddha, but agrees to speak with the Buddha about the contest. In this version, the Buddha advises his followers against doing such miracles, but states he will do this miracle because all Buddhas are supposed to perform the twin miracle.

The Buddha declares that he will perform the miracle at the foot of a mango tree in Sravasti on the full moon day of Asalha Puja in four months time. According to the Pali recording, the rival teachers, desperate to avoid the contest, uproot all of the mango trees in the area prior to the miracle tournament. On the day of the tournament, a royal gardener finds a mango on the floor that he prepares to give to the king, but upon seeing the Buddha walk by, he gives it to the Buddha instead. When the time of the miracle contest approaches, the Buddha eats the mango and plants the seed in front of the city gate, after washing his hands over the area, a full mango tree immediately grows.

The Buddha starts by creating a jeweled walkway in midair and prepares to perform the miracle for the crowd of observers, but is interrupted by several of his disciples, who ask to perform a miracle in his place to save him the trouble. The disciples each propose a different miracle for them to perform in the Buddha's place but he refuses each request. Finally Maha Moggallana, the Buddha's chief disciple foremost in psychic powers, offers to perform a miracle in his place but the Buddha still refuses. He then states that he must perform the miracle himself, as it is one of the duties of a Buddha. Standing on top of the jeweled walkway, the Buddha enters a meditative state and emits fire from the top half of his body and streams of water from the lower half and then starts alternating the fire and water between the positions, creating an array of six colors. The fire and water then shoot up to illuminate the cosmos to the applause of the audience while the Buddha teaches the Dharma to the observers as he walks along on the jeweled walkway. The Sanskrit recording also includes the Buddha creating several duplicates of himself that fill the air during miracles, with some walking, lying down, and sitting.

At the Pali recorded conclusion of the twin miracle, it is the six religious leaders' turn to perform a miracle but they are unable to move. A strong wind knocks down the pavilion they prepared for the tournament and the rival teachers flee, with one committing suicide The Buddha continues the miracle and proceeds to create a single duplicate of himself and then has the duplicate ask him questions which he would in turn answer in order to teach the observing audience

Following the miracle, the Buddha is said to have ascended to the Heaven of the Thirty-three, or Tavatimsa Heaven for three months to spend his rains-retreat and teach his deceased mother the Abhidharma, in accordance with what all Buddhas are believed to have done after performing the miracle.

After teaching his mother, the Buddha descended from the heavens on the jeweled ladder at Sunkisa, 30 leagues from Sravasti, with the beings of the celestial realm in attendance.

The Miracle at Sravasti
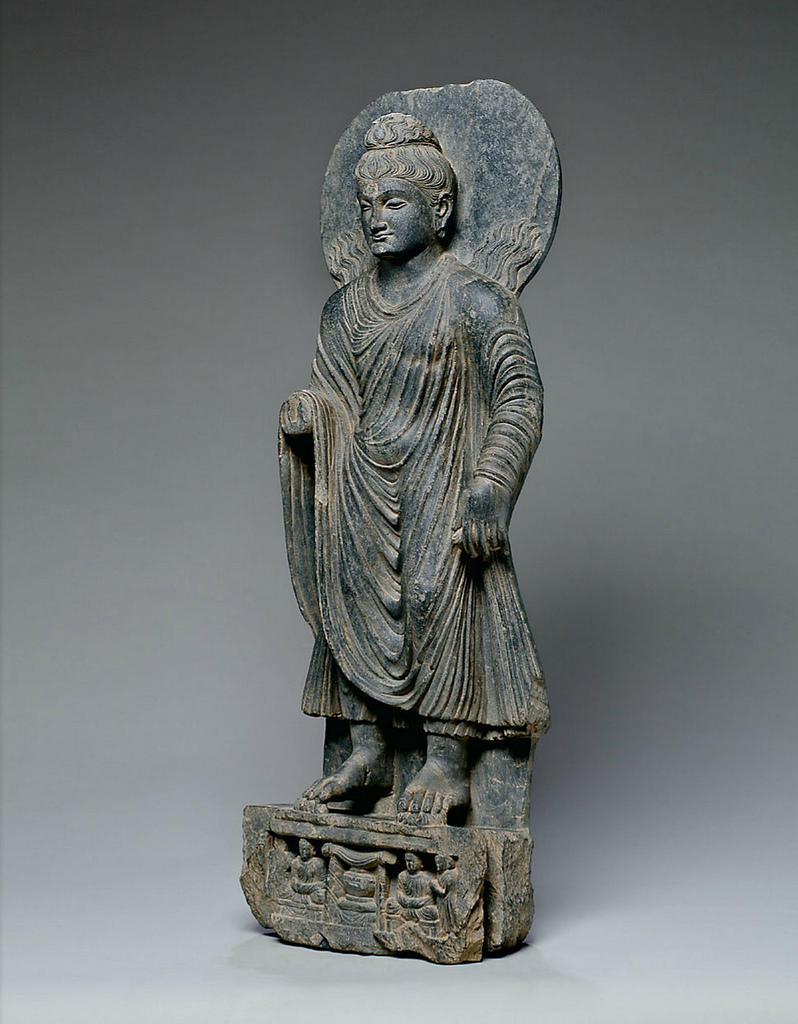
Statue of Buddha performing the Miracle of Shravasti, Gandhara, 100-200 CE.

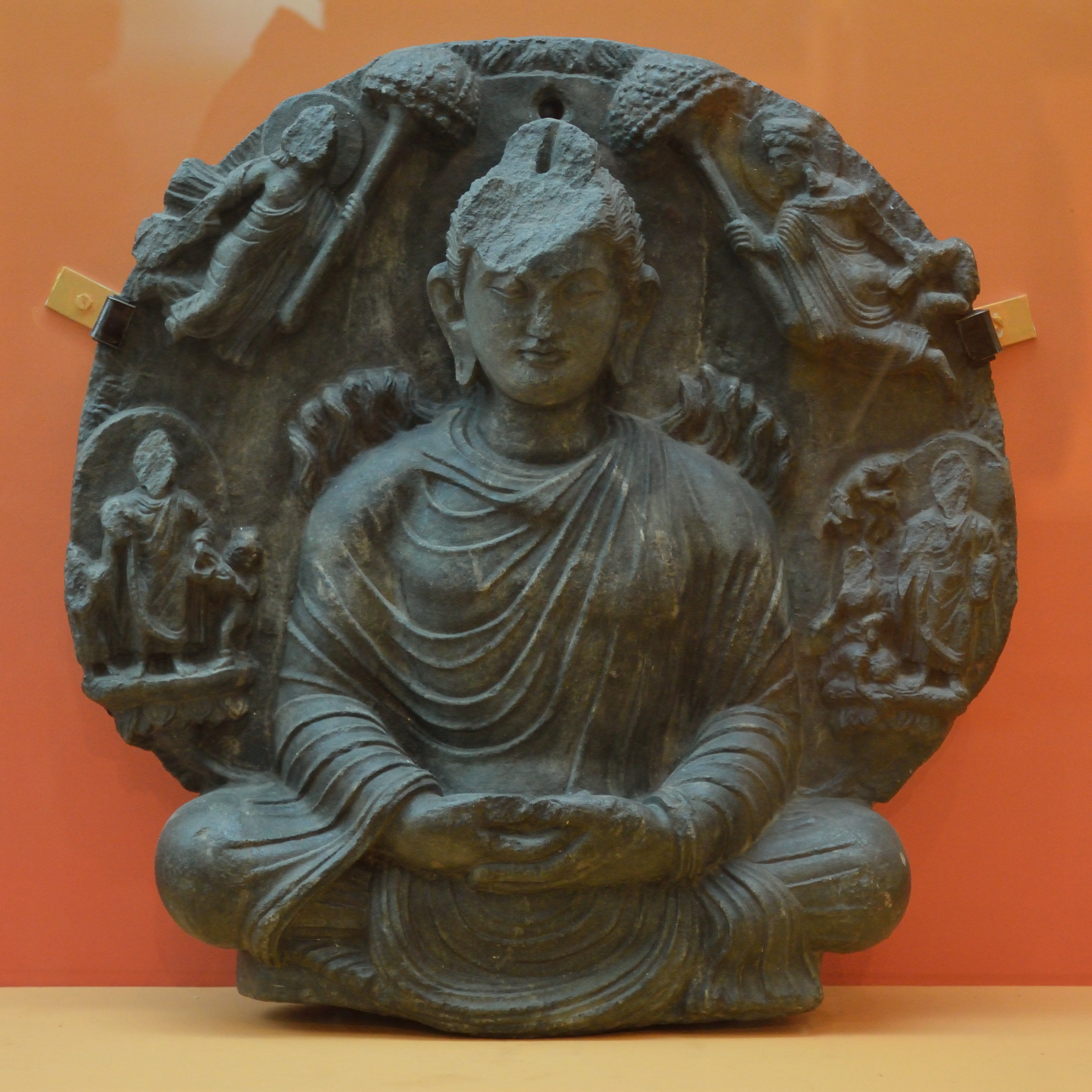
Miracle of Sravasti, ca 2nd Century CE - Gandhara

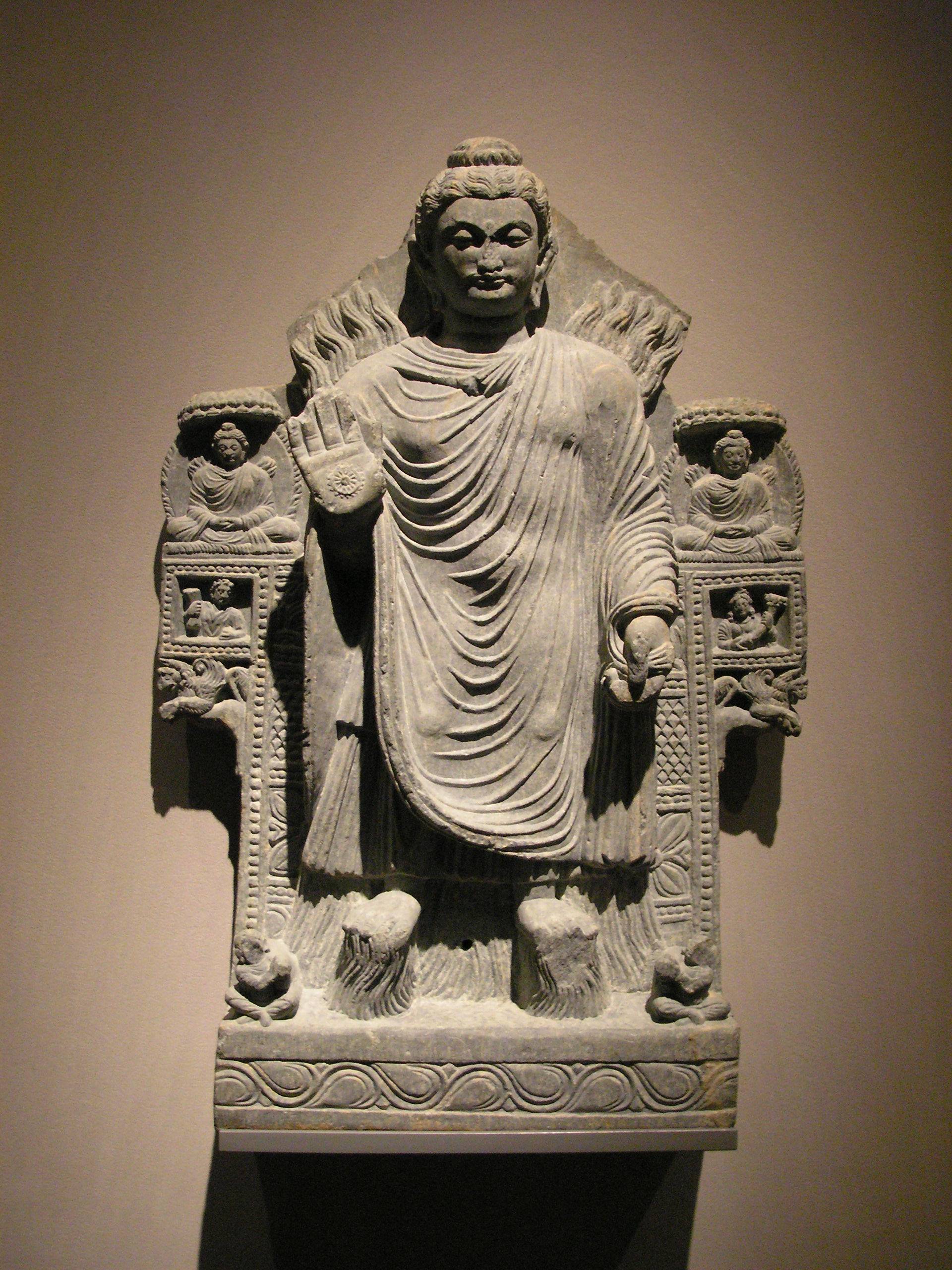
Gandhara, 3rd century CE.

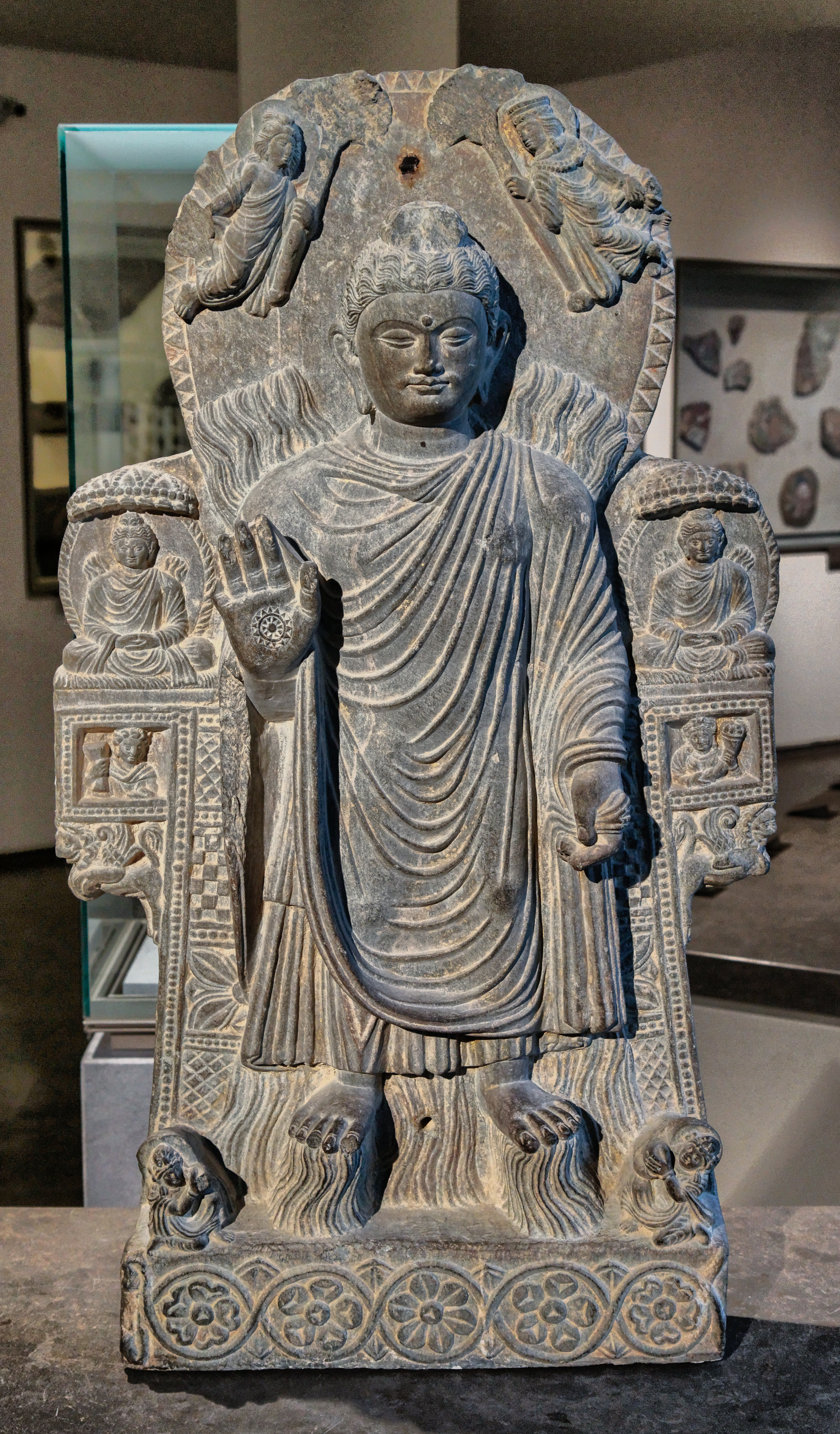
Kapisa, 3rd century CE.

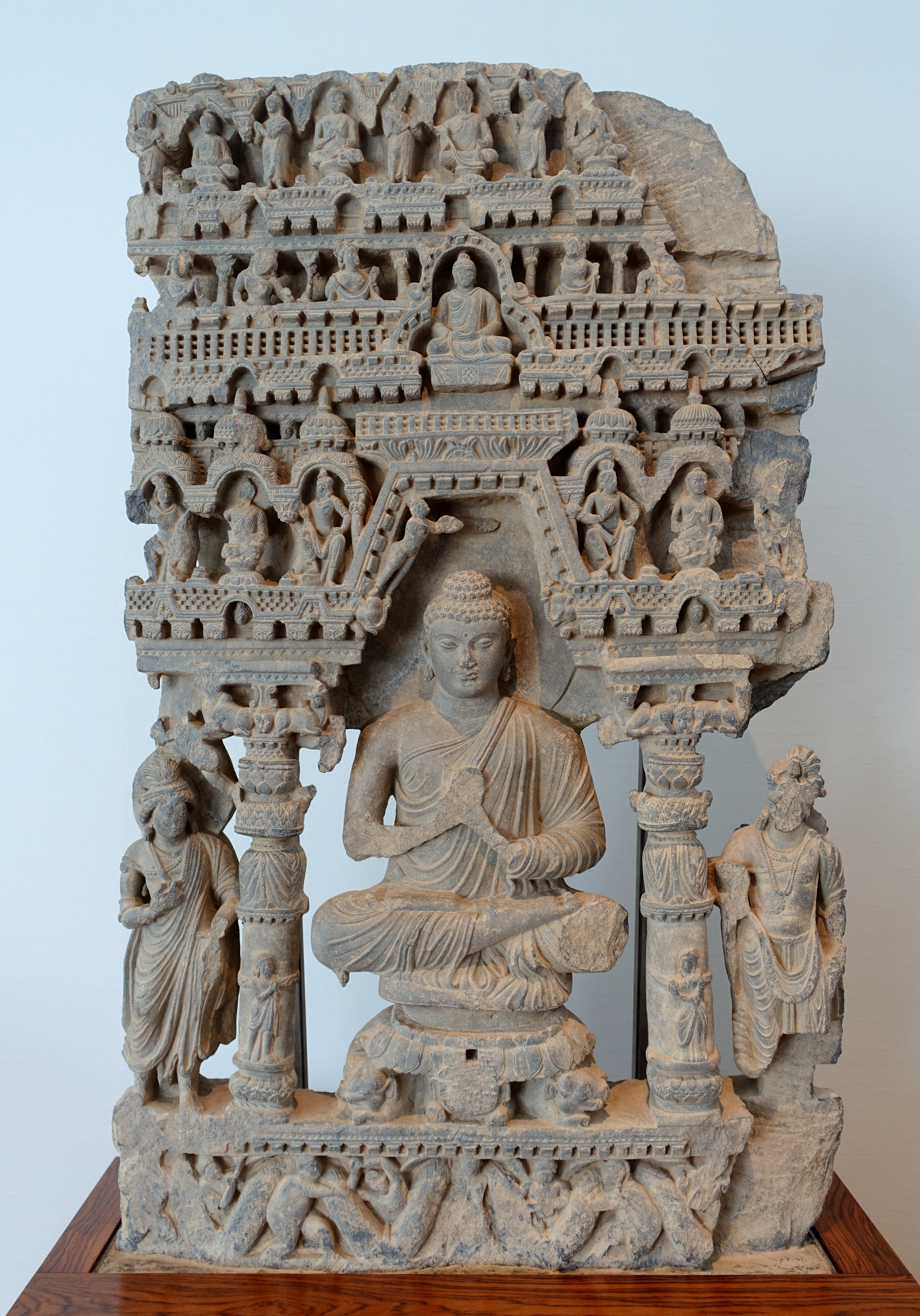
Gandhara, c. 3rd century CE

== Miracle Month at Sravasti ==
In the Sanskrit version of the events, the Miracle Month at Sravasti occurs during the first fifteen days of the lunar New Year with the Buddha performing a miracle in each of the fourteen days prior to the tournament scheduled for the full moon of the 15th day. Each day, a feast was offered to all beings present while afterward the Buddha displayed a miracle as he taught the Dharma.

On the first day, after King Prasenajit's offering of the meal, a toothpick the Buddha stuck into the earth grew instantly into an enormous tree kilometers high that displayed lights and marvels and resounded with the voice of the Buddha teaching.

On the second day, the Buddha manifested jewelled mountains with all kinds of food and flowing water, which resounded with the voice of the Buddha teaching.

On the third day an enormous lake was manifested and the voice of the Buddha teaching resounded.

On the fourth day, a large pool with eight circular streams that flowed as one body of water was manifested. The voice of the Buddha teaching the aspects of the doctrine resounded from the water.

The fifth day, a golden light emanating from the Buddha and filled the entire world, purifying the three defilements of desire, hatred, and ignorance. Filled with peace, the voice of the Buddha teaching resounded with the Dharma.

On the sixth day, the Buddha enabled all present to see each other's minds. Then the voice of the Buddha teaching resounded.

On day seven, the Buddha's own Sakya clan made the feast offerings, and he blessed them by transforming each into chakravartins, or Universal Kings supporting the Dharma with seven jewels apiece.

On day eight, Indra and Brahma sat at the Buddha's sides and made offerings. The Buddha touched the ground and elephants trumpeted. Five demons swept into the field and destroyed the thrones of the six teachers. Vajrapani's display of fire and the wrath frightened them away and all of the six teachers jumped in unison into the water in order to flee. Their 90,000 students ask to become fully ordained monks, and each attained arhatship. Then 84,000 rays of light with lotuses and buddhas teaching on each point radiated from the pores of the Buddha's body into space. It filled all present with joy.

On day nine, the Buddha extended his body to the realm of Brahma in space, and taught from there.

On day ten, the four celestial dharma protecting king invited the Buddha to teach, and his teachings were emanated from the light rays of his body.

On day eleven, the Buddha became a transparent golden light from which the teachings resounded.

On day twelve, the householder Tsesa made offerings and the Buddha entered the meditation of Great Love, clearing the three poisons from all. A golden light radiated from the Buddha and all present were filled with compassion and love for each other.

On day thirteen, the Buddha emitted two light rays from his navel that he multiplied endlessly around the world with buddhas teaching on every ray.

On day fourteen, shrewn flowers were offered to the Buddha which he transformed into 1,250 jeweled carriages, and taught the Dharma throughout the world "as a doctor healed the sick".

In the Sanskrit recording of the miracles at Sravasti, on the 15th day King Bimbisara is asked to bring vessels to the field which the Buddha fills with hundreds of foods that completely satisfies on outer and inner levels all beings in attendance. "As on all the previous days, those assembled attained great advancement. Some increased their bodhi-mind, some attained arhatship, some attained the stage of non-returning, many attained the seeds of rebirth as humans or gods, and countless others increased their virtue."

More miracles are attributed to this time including the Buddha manipulating air to put out a fire, and restoring the hands and feet of King Pasenadi's brother, who lost his hands and feet for a crime he didn't commit.
