= Abhijñā =

Supernormal knowledge in Buddhism

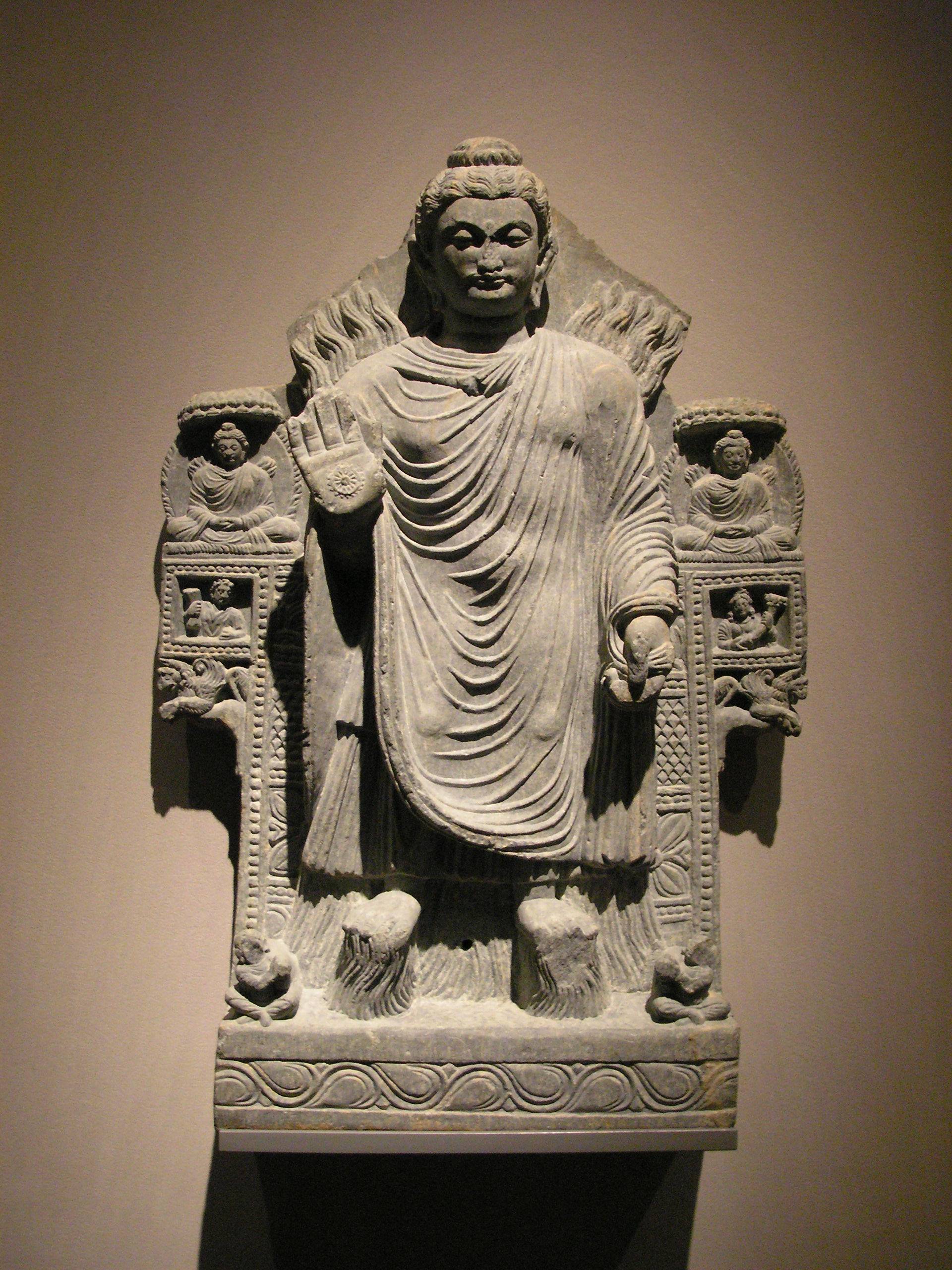
Gautama Buddha depicted in Greco-Buddhist style, demonstrating control over the fire and water elements. 3rd century CE, Gandhara (modern eastern Afghanistan).

Abhijñā (Sanskrit: अभिज्ञा; Pali pronunciation: abhiññā; Standard Tibetan: མངོན་ཤེས mngon shes; Chinese: 六通／神通／六神通; pinyin: Liùtōng/Shéntōng/Liùshéntōng; Japanese: 六神通, romanized: Rokujinzū/Rokujintsū) is a Buddhist term generally translated as "direct knowledge", "higher knowledge" or "supernormal knowledge." In Buddhism, such special knowledge is obtained through virtuous living and meditation. The attainment of the four jhānas, or meditative absorptions, is considered a prerequisite for the attainment of the higher knowledges. Enumerated forms of abhijñā include mundane extra-sensory abilities (such as seeing past lives and various supranormal powers like levitation) as well as the supramundane, meaning the extinction of all mental intoxicants or influxes (āsava).

== Pali literature ==
In Pali literature, abhiññā refers both to the direct apprehension of dhamma (translated below as "states" and "qualities") and to specialized super-normal capabilities.

=== Direct knowing of dhamma ===
In SN 45.159, the Buddha describes "direct knowledge" (abhiññā) as a corollary to the pursuit of the Noble Eightfold Path:

[A] monk who cultivates the Noble Eightfold Path, who assiduously practices the Noble Eightfold Path, comprehends with direct knowledge those states that are to be so comprehended, abandons with direct knowledge those states that are to be so abandoned, comes to experience with direct knowledge those states that are to be so experienced, and cultivates with direct knowledge those states that are to be so cultivated.

What, monks, are the states to be comprehended with direct knowledge?
They are the five aggregates. Which five? The form aggregate, the feeling aggregate, the perception aggregate, the mental-formation aggregate, the consciousness-aggregate...

What, monks, are the states to be abandoned with direct knowledge?
They are ignorance and the desire for [further] becoming. And what, monks, are the states to be experienced with direct knowledge?
They are true knowledge and liberation.

And what, monk, are the states to be cultivated with direct knowledge?
They are serenity and insight.

Such direct knowledge, according to the Buddha, is obscured by clinging to the five aggregates, desire and passion (chanda-rāga):

Monks, any desire-passion with regard to the eye is a defilement of the mind. Any desire-passion with regard to the ear... the nose... the tongue... the body... the intellect is a defilement of the mind. When, with regard to these six bases, the defilements of awareness are abandoned, then the mind is inclined to renunciation. The mind fostered by renunciation feels malleable for the direct knowing of those qualities worth realizing.

=== Enumerations of special knowledges ===
In the Pali Canon, the higher knowledges are often enumerated in a group of six or of three types of knowledge.

The six types of higher knowledges (chalabhiññā) are:

1. "Higher powers" (iddhi-vidhā), such as walking on water and through walls;
2. "Divine ear" (dibba-sota), that is, clairaudience;
3. "Mind-penetrating knowledge" (ceto-pariya-ñāṇa), that is, telepathy;
4. "Remember one's former abodes" (pubbe-nivāsanussati), causal memory, that is, recalling one's own past lives;
5. "Divine eye" (dibba-cakkhu), that is, knowing others' karmic destinations; and,
6. "Extinction of mental intoxicants" (āsavakkhaya), upon which arahantship follows.

The attainment of these six higher powers is mentioned in a number of discourses, including the "Fruits of Contemplative Life Discourse" (Samaññaphala Sutta, DN 2). The attainment of the four jhānas is considered to be a prerequisite for the attainment of the higher powers. The sixth type is the ultimate goal of Buddhism, which is the end of all suffering and destruction of all ignorance.

Although such powers are considered to be indicative of spiritual progress, according to the Buddha, indulgence in or exhibition of the abhiññās should be avoided, as they can distract from the ultimate goal of Enlightenment.

Similarly, the three knowledges or wisdoms (tevijjā or tivijjā) are:

1. "Remember one's former abodes" (pubbe-nivāsanussati);
2. "Divine eye" (dibba-cakkhu); and,
3. "Extinction of mental intoxicants" (āsavakkhaya).

Richard Gombrich argues that the Buddhist use of tevijjā is "an example of the Buddha's revalorization of terms". For Brahmins, "three knowledges" referred to mastery of the Rg, Sama, and Yajur Vedas. Gombrich notes that in early Buddhist texts, the Buddha "redefined the three salvific knowledges as knowledge of one's former births, knowledge of the rebirths of others, and knowledge that one's corruptions had been eliminated". Gombrich adds that calling them three knowledges was "surely no accident", since there is "nothing inherently triple" about them.

The three knowledges are mentioned in numerous discourses, including the Mahā-Saccaka Sutta (MN 36), in which the Buddha describes obtaining each of these three knowledges on the first, second and third watches respectively of the night of his enlightenment. These forms of knowledge are typically listed as arising after the attainment of the fourth jhāna.

== Parallels in other cultures ==
The first five types of Abhijna, are similar to the siddhis of yoga in Hinduism, mentioned in the Bhagavata Purana and by Patanjali:

- Knowing the past, present and future;
- Tolerance of heat, cold and other dualities;
- Knowing the minds of others;
- Checking the influence of fire, sun, water, poison, and so on;
- Remaining unconquered by others.

== See also ==
- Iddhi
- Miracles of Gautama Buddha
- Prajñā
- Nibbana, obtain cessation of suffering
- Samaññaphala Sutta
- Siddhi
- Vibhuti

== Sources ==
- "Abhijna" (2007). In Encyclopædia Britannica. Retrieved 2007-05-18 from Encyclopædia Britannica Online: https://www.britannica.com/eb/article-9003346.
- "Abhinna" (2007). In Orientalia: Eastern Philosophy, Religion and Culture. Retrieved 2007-05-18 from Orientalia: https://web.archive.org/web/20050506001255/http://orientalia.org/dictionary-Buddhist_Dictionary-definition22811-abhinna.html.
- Bodhi, Bhikkhu (trans.) (2000). The Connected Discourses of the Buddha: A Translation of the Samyutta Nikaya. Boston: Wisdom Publications. ISBN 0-86171-331-1.
- Rhys Davids, T.W. & William Stede (eds.) (1921-5). "Abhiññā" in The Pali Text Society's Pali–English Dictionary. Chipstead: Pali Text Society. Retrieved 2007-05-18 from Digital Dictionaries of South Asia:.
- Sarbacker, Stuart Ray (2021), Tracing the Path of Yoga: The History and Philosophy of Indian Mind-Body Discipline, State University of New York Press
- Thanissaro Bhikkhu (trans.) (1994). Upakkilesa Samyutta: Defilements (SN 27.1-10). Retrieved 2008-07-17 from "Access to Insight" at http://www.accesstoinsight.org/tipitaka/sn/sn27/sn27.001-010.than.html.
- Thanissaro Bhikkhu (trans.) (1997). Samaññaphala Sutta: The Fruits of the Contemplative Life (DN 2). Retrieved 2007-05-18 from: http://www.accesstoinsight.org/tipitaka/dn/dn.02.0.than.html.
- Thanissaro Bhikkhu (trans.) (1998). Maha-Saccaka Sutta: The Longer Discourse to Saccaka (excerpt) (MN 36). Retrieved 2007-05-19 from: https://web.archive.org/web/20080801091439/http://www.accesstoinsight.org/tipitaka/mn/mn.036x.than.html.
- Walshe, Maurice O'C. (1985). Samyutta Nikaya: An Anthology (Part III) (Wheel Nos. 318–21). Kandy: Buddhist Publication Society. Retrieved 2008-07-17 from "Access to Insight" (transcribed 2007) at http://www.accesstoinsight.org/lib/authors/walshe/wheel318.html.
