= Kevatta Sutta =

11th Sutta in the Digha Nikaya, Pāli Canon

The Kevatta Sutta (or Kevaddha) is a Buddhist scripture, is the 11th of the 34 suttas of the Digha Nikaya (long discourses collection) of the Pali Canon. The scripture takes its name from the householder Kevatta, who invites the Buddha to display various miraculous powers in order to show his spiritual superiority. The Buddha responds by expressing his belief that supernatural powers are not a valid measure of spiritual development, because they can be falsified through the use of charms and spells.

He goes on to deliver a discourse on virtue, expressing the belief that it is virtuous conduct, rather than supernatural developments, that display the superiority or spiritual development of a teacher. He also states that such practices will give rise to powers greater than those available to practitioners of traditional magic and austerities.

The scripture is significant to the study of Buddhism because it constitutes one of the clearest statements in the scriptures of the Buddha's opposition to the notion of magical power and supernatural abilities as the best indicator of truth or virtue. In setting out such a belief, the Buddha placed himself in opposition to much of the popular religious traditions derived from the Vedas, which often focused on the acquisition of supernatural powers as an ends unto itself, and as a means of measuring spiritual worthiness.
