= Tan-luan =

Chinese Buddhist monk

Tanluan

Tanluan (Chinese: 曇鸞; Japanese pronunciation: Donran, 476–554) was a Chinese Buddhist monk who wrote on Pure Land Buddhism.

Tanluan was the first East Asian Buddhist to stress the importance of the Buddha's Other Power as a liberating force. He held that through the practice of nianfo (buddha recollection), the Buddha's power would take them to the pure land after death. This doctrine would become very important in later Pure Land Buddhism.

Tanluan's main work is his Jingtu lun zhu (浄土論註; T. 1819), a Commentary to Vasubandhu's Discourse on the Pure Land.

Tanluan is considered to be the Third Patriarch of Pure land Buddhism by the Japanese Pure Land sects like Jōdo-shu and Jōdo Shinshū. He was a significant influence on later Pure Land masters like Shandao and Shinran.

== Life ==
Tanluan was born in Shanxi, in an area near Wu-t’ai shan. As a young boy he climbed the mountain and visited its holy sites. He joined the Buddhist monastic community early on and became a scholar, studying the Sanlun (Madhyamaka) and Yogacara schools. After becoming ill, he also studied Taoism and the Taoist canon under Taoist master Tao Hongjing (456–536) in order to seek the Pill of Immortality and prolong his life.

One day, while passing through the city of Loyang, Tanluan had a striking encounter with Bodhiruci, a Buddhist monk from India who had come to China to translate and transmit the Mahayana sutras. When Tanluan asked him about finding immortality, Bodhiruci told him he would not find it in this world, and gave him a copy of the Amitayus Sutra, which discusses the Pure Land of the Buddha "Measureless Life" (Amitayus, Amitabha). Tánluán then became a devotee of Pure Land Buddhism and burnt his Taoist texts.

Shinkō Mochizuki argues that this story is unlikely to be accurate however, as Tanluan actually criticizes a Bodhiruci's translation in one of his writings in a way that a student would not do. Mochizuki instead posits Tao-ch’ang as a likely teacher of Tanluan, since Daochuo lists him as a previous master of the Pure Land lineage.

Whatever the case, Tanluan soon returned to his home, where he practiced and taught Pure Land Buddhism to monks and laity alike. Tanluan's reputation grew, eventually drawing the attention of the Emperor of the Wei Dynasty, who honored him with the title “Shen-Luan” (Divine Bird). In recognition of his achievements, the Emperor entrusted him with the Ta-yen Ssu Monastery in Ping-chou.

Later, he relocated to Hsüan-chung Ssu Monastery, situated at the base of the Pei-shan cliffs in Chiao-ch’eng Hsien, Shanxi. There, he gathered a community of disciples, with whom he diligently practiced nianfo. According to historical accounts, Tanluan passed away in the year 542 at the age of sixty-six, in a secluded mountain monastery in Ping-yao.

== Works ==
Tanluan's magnum opus is the influential Commentary on [Vasubandhu's] Treatise on the Pure Land (Wúliángshòujīng yōupótíshè yuànshēngjié zhù, 無量壽經優婆提舍願生偈註, T. 1819, also known as Jingtu wangsheng lun zhujie 淨土往生論註解). According to Roger Corless, Tanluan's commentary is the "first systematic treatise on Chinese Pure Land Buddhism which has come down to us".

This commentary focuses on how all beings can swiftly attain the bodhisattva stage of non-retrogression by attaining birth in Sukhavati, the pure land of the Buddha Amitābha, through the sincere practice of nianfo (buddha recollection, or mindfulness of the buddha).

Tanluan also wrote Verses in Praise of Buddha Amitabha (讃阿弥陀仏偈, Zan Omituofoji, T. 1978) and a Condensed Commentary on the Significance of the Pure Land of Peace and Bliss (Lüelun anyuele jingtu yi, 略論安楽浄土義 T. 1957).

However some scholars have questioned the authenticity of the Condensed Commentary.

== Teaching ==
Tanluan’s central teachings are found in his Commentary on the Rebirth Treatise (Jingtu lun zu). He often relies on Madhyamaka philosophy, and cites the Dazhidulun widely.

At the outset of his Commentary, Tanluan cites the "Chapter on Easy Practice" (from the Daśabhūmika-vibhāṣā), traditionally attributed to Nāgārjuna to establish the two paths a bodhisattva can embark on: the difficult path (nanxing dao 難行道; i.e. the path of the perfections) and the path of easy practice (yixing dao 易行道,), i.e. attaining birth in the pure land, where one is empowered by the Buddha and is assured of progress.

In this world, where the Buddha’s presence is absent, the presence of deluded people, evil people, non-Buddhists, and non-Mahayana teachings lead bodhisattvas away from their practice, confusing and obstructing them. Since the Buddha is not present here now, we cannot learn the teaching directly from him, and have no guarantee of finding an awakened teacher. We must therefore rely on our own deluded opinions when practicing the path and this hinders our practice. Thus, the path of the perfections is very difficult, like taking a long journey overland.

However, if one relies on the power of the Buddha's power to carry one to the Pure Land after death, one will attain the stage of non-retrogression (avaivartika), from which there is no falling back into lower states of rebirth. In the pure land we can hear the Dharma from the Buddha and can attain awakening rapidly. Since this path depends on an external power rather than one's own effort, it is likened to sailing across water in a boat rather than walking on land and so it is "the path of easy practice."

=== Buddha's other power ===
Tanluan argues that the pure land path is easy because it relies on the Buddha's power, not on one's own efforts. He is the first figure to use the term "other power" (Chinese: tālì, 他力) in a Pure Land context, a term that would become central for later Pure Land Buddhism. In his Commentary, Tanluan emphasizes the immense power of Amitābha’s Fundamental Vows. He explains that practicing the five forms of nianfo (remembering the Buddha), benefiting both oneself and others, and enlightenment itself all depend on Amitābha. Thus, he writes:

On the path of easy practice, one simple aspires to the born in the Pure Land with faith in the Buddha as the cause. Carried by the power of the Buddha's Vow, one quickly attains birth in that Buddha's pure land. Sustained by the Buddha's power, one immediately enters the stage of the rightly settled of the Mahayana.

Tanluan is also the first thinker in East Asian Buddhism to argue that other-power is "the dominant causal condition" (Ch: zēngshàng yuán 增上緣; Sanskrit: adhipatipratyaya) for the attainment of complete Buddhahood:

Due to the power of this Vow of the Buddha, the bodhisattva surpasses the practices of the usual stages and actually practices the virtues of Samantabhadra....When we thus consider Other Power, we find that it is the dominant condition for swiftly realizing anuttara-samyak sambodhi.

Tanluan uses various similes to illustrate the Buddha's vow power. He compares the “power of the original vow” (běn yuànlì 本願力) of Amitabha Buddha which can eliminate eons of bad karma in a single moment of nianfo to how "a pile of firewood accumulated by a hundred men for a hundred years that can be burned in half a day by a bean-sized spark." He also compares the Buddha's name to a light which can illuminate a dark room, even if that room has been dark for eons. This is why Tanluan thinks that through pure land practice, even someone who has committed the “Five Heinous Deeds” (including killing one's parents, harming a saint, etc) and the “ten evils” can attain birth in the pure land. Tanluan also compares relying on other power to following in the procession of a Cakravartin king, which allows one to travel to any continent with ease. Tanluan states "I urge students in the future to listen to the teaching that you should ride upon Other Power and awaken faith. Do not restrict yourself to your own powers."

=== Buddha's vows ===
Tanluan also discusses the forty-eight vows which Amitabha Buddha made in the past (as taught in the Amitayus Sutra). These vows are closely connected with Buddha's power and his salvific activity, since he practiced for eons as a bodhisattva to fulfill them. Indeed, Tanluan writes that "His power and his resolution go together, in the final analysis they are not different." Furthermore, Amitābha’s Fundamental Vow does not only facilitate rebirth in the Pure Land for all kinds of people, but also supports the virtuous actions of bodhisattvas and humans. For Tanluan, the power of the Buddha's vow is not just the main cause for birth in the pure land, it is the main support for practice in the pure land. He writes:

Birth in the pure land, as well as the practices performed by the bodhisattvas, human beings, and devas there, are all due to the power of Amida Tathagata's Primal Vow. Why is this? It is because, were it not for the Buddha's power, the Forty-eight Vows would have been made in vain.

Among the forty-eight vows, Tanluan highlights the eleventh, eighteenth, and twenty-second as particularly significant. These vows ensure that anyone can achieve rebirth in the Pure Land, attainment of non-regression, and rapid progress toward Buddhahood. His account of these key vows become a major source for this topic later Pure Land authors like Shinran. According to Tanluan's account:

- The Eleventh Vow guarantees that those reborn in the Pure Land will join the assembly of those definitively assured of Buddhahood. Through this vow, Buddha ensures that beings remain in this assembly and achieve the state of non-regression.
- The Eighteenth Vow is the essential vow of rebirth in the Pure Land. According to Tanluan, this vow enables all sentient beings from all ten directions to attain rebirth in Amitābha’s Pure Land.
- The Twenty-Second Vow ensures that those reborn in the Pure Land will advance rapidly toward Buddhahood. Instead of progressing step by step through the various bodhisattva stages (bhūmis), the devotee bypasses these stages, reaching the stage of “only one more rebirth” [until Buddhahood], bringing them to the threshold of ultimate awakening.

=== The transformative power of the pure land ===
Drawing on the Mahayana teaching of emptiness, Tanluan further argues that, Amitābha, in his past life as bodhisattva Dharmākara, made his forty eight vows when he entered the eighth bodhisattva stage. This is the level at which a bodhisattva attains the wisdom of the non-arising of all phenomena (which sees that all things do not ultimately come to being, or cease to be, since they are empty and illusory). For Tanluan, it was at the very moment of his realization of non-arising that Amitabha also resolved to give rise to the pure land. This means that the pure land is the "Realm of Non-Arising" (ch: wúshēng jiè 無生界), a subtle realm beyond the triple-world (trailokadhātu) that is not separate from the Buddha's pure mind. Furthermore, it means that all the decorations of the pure land have their source in the purity of the Buddha's mind.

Beings who are born in the pure land through the Buddha's power are able to achieve the lofty attainment known as the patience towards the non-arising of dharmas (skt. anutpattikadharmakṣānti). Thus, when beings aspire to be born in the pure land, they think they will attain "birth" there, but actually, at death, they attain the wisdom which goes beyond all notions of coming or going, arising, and birth. Therefore, the pure land has the ability to purify the ignorant minds who are reborn there. Tanluan uses various similes to illustrate this effect. He compares it to the sea who overwhelms any fresh waters that enter it with its saltiness. He also compares the pure land to a wish fulfilling jewel (cintāmaṇi) that can magically transform the nature of any waters it is placed in.

Roger Corless describes Tanluan's positive and cataphatic buddhology as "a mysticism of light" and as "alamkaric" (from the Sanskrit word for "ornament", alaṃkāra). He contrasts this with the negative and apophatic type of Buddhist mysticism that focuses on a rhetoric of emptiness. According to Corless, Tanluan's teaching draws on images of light and on the beauty of the pure land's arrays (vyūha) and shining ornaments to draw people to attain birth there, where true wisdom will be attained. The brilliance of the pure land is thus a skillful means, which draws us to it in this life, but which douses all our craving once we meet it in the pure land, like water putting out fire.

=== Tanluan's non-dual buddhology ===
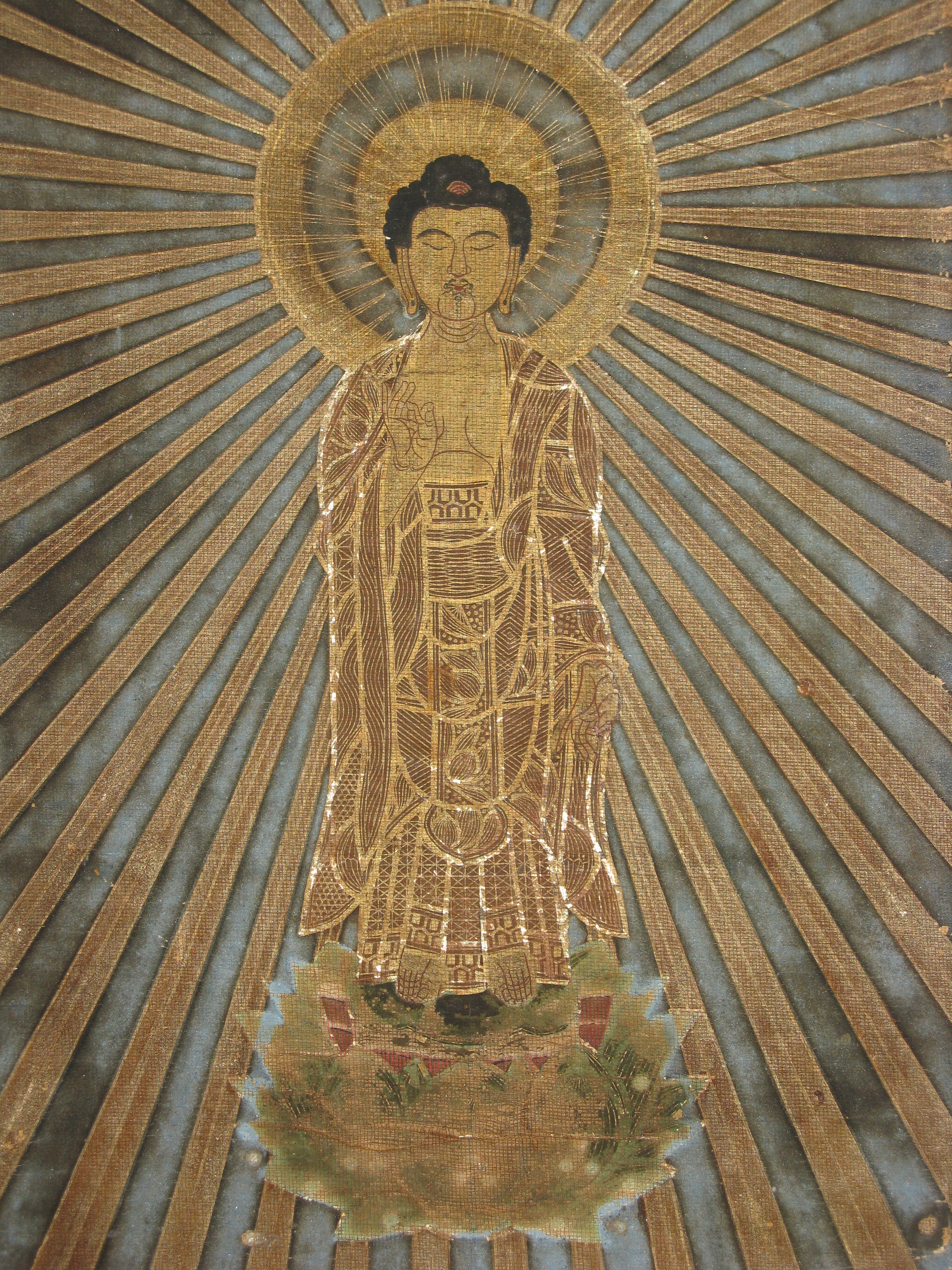
"Amida Manifesting in the Dharma-body of Expedient Means", Japanese painting, at the Met.

Tanluan provides an analysis of the Buddha bodies theory which contains a dual aspect Dharmakaya, that is ultimately the non-dual union of form and emptiness, wisdom and compassion. Thus, in Tanluan's buddhology, Amitābha Buddha is composed of two bodies, which are indivisible and “not one and not different”. These two are:

- The Dharma body of the True Nature (Ch: 法性法身 fǎxìng fǎshēn; Skt. dharmatā dharmakāya), which is unconditioned wisdom, formless and totally beyond words and concepts.
- The Dharmakaya of Skillful Means (方便法身 fāngbiàn fǎshēn; upāya dharmakāya), the compassionate aspect of the true nature Dharmakaya which appears as a divine luminous body and as the pure land. It is associated with the Buddha's great compassion, which manifests a body with form and characteristics in order to save all beings.

According to Tanluan "from the dharmakāya of Dharma-nature originates the dharmakāya of Expediency; through the dharmakāya of Expediency the dharmakāya of Dharma-nature is revealed. These two dharmakāyas are different but inseparable; they are one but not the same." According to Yukio Yamada, Tanluan's main focus in this presentation is to explain the relation between the ultimate formless Dharma nature (Thusness) and the glorious adornments and forms of the pure land. This is a horizontal relationship of simultaneous immediacy, instead of a vertical relationship in which one aspect is more fundamental or temporally primary.

Tanluan establishes the non-duality of these two aspects of the Buddha's ultimate Dharma body and therefore the necessity of a Dharmakaya which displays forms in the following complex argument:

True knowledge is knowledge of the true marks. Because the true marks have no marks, true knowledge has no knowing. The unconditioned Dharmakāya is the Dharmatā Dharmakāya. Because Dharmatā is quiescent, the Dharmakāya has no marks. Because it has no marks, there is nothing which it does not mark. Therefore, the Dharmakāya is none other than that which is adorned with the Marks and Signs. Because it has no knowing, there is nothing which it does not know. Therefore, true knowledge is the same as omniscience. If knowledge is classified as true, it is clear that knowledge is neither created nor uncreated. If the Dharmakāya is categorized as unconditioned it is clear that the Dharmakāya is neither with form nor formless.

This argument draws on Chinese Madhyamaka reasoning to argue that ultimate reality has no ultimate characteristics, qualities or "marks" (lakṣaṇa) i.e. it is empty. Since the Dharmakaya's ultimate knowledge knows no thing (no marks), it is a knowledge beyond conditions and is boundless. Since the Dharmakaya is unconditioned wisdom, it is all pervasive and is not separate from the form body of the Buddha ("that which is adorned with the Marks and Signs"). Therefore, the Dharmakaya is not truly formless, while also not truly having any form of its own. Ultimate reality is thus neither with form nor without form. Tanluan argues that this is what Vasubandhu's Rebirth Treatise means when it describes the adornments and the inhabitants of the pure land as “the marks of the wonderful realm of ultimate truth”, and the pure land itself as "that Realm which surpasses the triple-world’s Way."

In this way, Tanluan manages to accommodate the formless wisdom of the Dharmakaya with the idea of Amitabha as a loving compassionate entity that manifests through forms to help beings who reside in the world of form. As Roger Corless writes, this argument also "allows him to recommend the practice of visualization, based on form and leading to formlessness, but to escape the charge that this is dualistic, since the visualization of the form-body is itself precisely the experience of formlessness—as the Heart Sūtra says, form and formlessness are nondual."

Tanluan further emphasizes the non-duality of wisdom and skillful means in his discussion of how the Buddha's name (ming 名) and its ultimate meaning (yi 義) are fully integrated. Tanluan explains this as follows:

Regarding the integration and distinction of name and meaning, one should understand that wisdom (prajñā), compassion (karuṇā), and expedient means (upāya) constitute a threefold system, in which prajñā integrates expedient means. "Prajñā" is called the wisdom that realizes reality, while "upāya" is called the wisdom of skillful adaptation...Thus, wisdom and expedient means mutually depend on each other: they interact dynamically yet remain still; their movement does not compromise stillness, which is the function of wisdom, and their stillness does not negate movement, which is the power of expedient means. Therefore, wisdom, compassion, and expedient means integrate into wisdom, and wisdom integrates into expedient means. (T.40.841b)

As such, Tanluan is able to present a theory of non-duality which supports the pure land practice of nianfo (buddha recollection), seeing that the Name of Amitābha Buddha is the skillful means which is supremely adorned with pure forms and boundless Buddha qualities.

=== Practice ===
Tanluan's outline of Pure Land practice is based on Vasubandhu's Treatise, and is based on five main types of nianfo ("buddha recollection") practices, called the five gates of nianfo. According to Tanluan:

Bodily practice is to prostrate and worship; oral practice is to offer praises; mental practice is to make vows; the practice of wisdom is to do visualization; the practice of the wisdom of expedient means is to transfer the merit. Bringing all five of these practices together is to follow the dharma-gate of rebirth in the Pure Land to its completion with ease.

In detail, these five gates of Buddha recollection (念門, nianmen) are:

- Prostrating / worshiping (C. lǐbài; J. raihai, Skt. namaskara) Amitabha Buddha with a mind aimed at birth in the pure land.
- Singing Praises (C. zàntàn; J. sandan, Skt. stotra) to Amitabha Buddha, as well as reciting the various names of Amitabha.
- Making Vows (C. zuòyuàn; J. sagan, Skt. praṇidhāna) with one-pointed mind, the devotee makes a vow to attain birth in the pure land and cultivates samatha (止 zhǐ). Tanluan gives a non-standard explanation of samatha, which traditionally means meditation on stilling the mind, but which Tanluan explains as “the stilling of evil”, i.e. the "stopping" of one's bad deeds. This stilling of evil deeds occurs naturally though the Buddha's power when one focuses one's thoughts on Amitabha and vows single mindedly to be born in the pure land.
- Contemplation Meditation (C. guānchá; J. kansatsu) - this refers to visualizing or meditating on twenty nine ornaments of the pure land and on Amitabha and the two bodhisattvas (Guanyin and Dashizhi). This is what Tanluan sees as the meaning of vipaśyanā (観 guān, clear seeing) in the Pure Land tradition.
- Transfer of Merits (C. huíxiàng; J. ekō, Skt. pariṇāma) - This has two aspects: “The aspect of going” is to transfer the merits of all of one's good deeds to the benefit of all sentient beings and to wish that they be born in the pure land with us. The "aspect of returning" happens after one is born in the pure land and masters skillful means as a bodhisattva. After this, one returns to this world to guide beings to the pure land. Furthermore, the intention to transfer our merit to others is none other than the “unsurpassed bodhicitta” taught in the Amitayus Sutra, the aspiration to become a Buddha and save all beings. Thus, according to Tanluan, if one desires to be born in the pure land, one must have bodhicitta. If you only desire to be born in the pure land in a selfish manner, then one will not attain birth.

For Tanluan, the realization of the five gates of nianfo practice leads to the complete development of both self-benefit (jiri 自利) and benefiting others (rita 利他) based on the Other Power derived from the Buddha’s vows. Tanluan also notes that from the Buddha’s standpoint, the phrase "benefiting others" should be understood as the Buddha benefiting unenlightened beings. On the other hand, when seen from the perspective of sentient beings, the idea of being benefited by the Buddha Amitabha should be emphasized.

=== How the practice works ===
According to Tanluan, the way Pure Land practices work is that they tap into the light (or glory, Skt.: ābha) of the Buddha, which a mark of his wisdom. This wisdom light is said to pervade the worlds of the ten directions. If one praises and recites Amitabha's names, and attains yogic union (ch: xiangying, skt: yoga) with the meaning of the Buddha's name, one's ignorance will be dissolved by Amitabha's light. This is because the destruction of delusion is the “function” (yung) of Amitabha's name.

Thus, according to Tanluan, when the Name is cast into a person's defiled mind, even just ten times, "his transgressions will be extinguished from thought to thought, his mind will become pure, and he will attain rebirth." He also claims that:

If all who hear the meritorious Name of Amitabha but have faith in, and take joy in what they have heard, and if for one instant of thought they have utmost sincerity, and if they transfer these merits and desire rebirth, then they shall attain rebirth.

Tanluan also gives an explanation of how meditating on the Buddha can transform the mind and thus how the mind can become Buddha. In this passage, he is commenting on a passage from the Contemplation Sutra which states: "when you create a mental representation of the Buddha, your very own mind is the [Buddha’s body with the] thirty-two marks and eighty signs, your mind becomes the Buddha, your mind is the Buddha." Tanluan comments:

When beings create a mental representation of the Buddha, the Buddha’s body, with its marks and signs, appears in the mind of beings. It is like an image appearing in clear water: the water and the image are neither the same nor different. So we can say that the Buddha’s body with its marks and signs is the same as one’s mental representation of it....Outside of the mind there is no Buddha. For example, fire comes from wood: without wood, one cannot have fire. But, because it is not separate from wood, it consumes the wood. The wood becomes fire, and, being fire, consumes the wood.

Here Tanluan maintains that the Buddha which is experienced during contemplative practice is produced by the mind in the mind. It thus has a subjective aspect. Yet Tanluan affirms the reality of the Dharmakāya as Amitābha's true body which “enters into the thoughts of all sentient beings” and “appears in their minds”. Thus, Tanluan also affirms an objective aspect to the Buddha one experiences in meditation or recitation. As such, for Tanluan, the forms and marks of Amitābha are neither one nor different from the mind. The Buddha experienced in contemplation is therefore a unity of subjectivity and objectivity.

=== Being in accordance with the meaning of the Name ===
Tanluan writes that "The name of the Tathāgata of Unhindered Light (Amitābha) can destroy all the ignorance of sentient beings and fulfill all their aspirations". This possible because the name "embodies infinite merit through his skillful means and adornments." However, he also says that if beings say the name and their ignorance is not removed, this is because they are not "yoked with" or "in accordance with" (Ch. xiangying, 相応) with the ultimate meaning of the Buddha's name and thus, with the ultimate reality. That is to say, they are not focused one-pointedly on the name and do not understand that the Buddha is the “true aspect body” (shíxiàng shēn 實相身), i.e. the body arisen from Dharmata with the power to liberate beings. This idea is based on the following passage from Vasubandhu's Rebirth Treatise:

How is praise accomplished? Praise is performed as a verbal act. Saying the name, in correspondence with the Tathāgata’s light that is the embodiment of wisdom, for one wants to practice in accord [xiangying] with the name’s significance, and with reality.

The Chinese term used by Tanluan here (xiangying) has been various interpreted by scholars as being derived from various Sanskrit terms, including yoga, prayoga, or even anuloma. In describing this term, Tanluan relies on a simile from the Dazhidulun: “To accord is like a box and a top fitting together.” In the Dazhidulun, this term is used to describe the nature of a bodhisattva who has attained prajñāpāramitā (the perfection of wisdom).

For Tanluan, this means that the Name of Amitabha must be recited in a state of union or synergy with the Buddha's light of wisdom and to be “accord with the Buddha’s teachings”. It is being "bound" to the name, in relationship with its true meaning, which is Buddha's wisdom and power. Tanluan writes of this wisdom light:

This light shines throughout the worlds of the ten quarters without hindrance; it eliminates the darkness of ignorance of the sentient beings of the ten quarters. It is thus unlike the light of the sun, the moon, or a gem, which can only brighten the darkness of a room....the Name of the Tathagata of unhindered light eliminates all the ignorance of sentient beings and fulfills all of their aspirations. But if ignorance remains and aspirations are not fulfilled even though one says the Name with mindfulness, it is because one does not practice in accord with reality, because one is not in correspondence with the significance of the Name. Why is one’s practice not in accord (union) with reality and not in correspondence with the significance of the Name? Because one does not know that the Tathagata is the true and real body and also the body for the sake of sentient beings.

Tanluan illustrates the concept of one-pointed concentration by using the analogy of a man fleeing from bandits. As the man runs, he encounters a river that he must cross to escape. His sole focus is on how to cross the river, without allowing any other concerns to distract him. Similarly, a devotee should concentrate single-mindedly on Amitābha Buddha, allowing no other thoughts to interrupt this. When ten uninterrupted thoughts of Amitabha arise in succession, this is called "ten continuous thoughts." This principle applies both to reciting the Buddha’s Name and visualizing his physical features. If the devotee maintains absolute focus, they will not be aware of how many thoughts have passed. However, if their thoughts alternate between remembering the Buddha and other distractions, they will be able to count their thoughts, but such interrupted contemplation does not qualify as true continuity.

In spite of his emphasis on yogic union with the meaning of the Name, Tanluan also makes it clear that even the lowest class of person, who have no understanding of emptiness and non-arising, can attain birth in the pure land through ten recitations of the Buddha's name. Tanluan argues that the name is like a wish fulfilling jewel, and so it can the purify muddy water of the mind. He also states:

Further, it is like ice thrown onto a blazing fire. The fire is fierce, so the ice disappears: but as the ice disappears, the fire goes out. Although the man of the lowest class does not know that dharmatā is unarisen, simply by the power of invoking the Buddha’s name, he makes the rebirth wish and resolves to be born in that land. That land is the realm of non-arising, so, though he falsely views it as birth, the fire [of his false view] is automatically put out.

=== True Faith ===
There is another key element which Tanluan highlights as important to practice in accordance with the true meaning of the Buddha's name. This is true faith (信心, xinxin), which Tanluan equates with Vasubandhu's “the mind that is single.” Tanluan argues that if one's faith is not sincere, single-minded, and continuous, then one's practice will not be efficacious in attaining yogic union with the true meaning of the Name. Only with sincere and continuous faith can one become yoked to the true meaning.

As such, reciting the name of Amitabha is not automatically efficacious on its own. One must have the right mental attitude, the attitude of true faith, for the name to work. Just like one needs to have one's eyes open to see any light, a devotee must be open to the Buddha's wisdom to be affected by it. Therefore, he writes that we must have a true faith which is (1) genuine, (2) single-minded and determined, and (3) constant, without gaps in one's commitment to the recitation of the Buddha's name (nianfo).

Tanluan teaches that the completion of ten full thoughts (jùzú shíniàn) with focus and true faith signifies the fulfillment of the practice necessary for rebirth in the Pure Land. However, the devotee does not need to be aware of the exact number of thoughts. The devotee’s role is simply to recall the Buddha with undivided focus, free from distraction, and to continue accumulating such thoughts without concern for counting them.

== Influence ==
Tánluán is influential in the history of Pure Land Buddhism since he was the first thinker to apply the term Other-power (Chinese: tālì 他力) to a Pure Land context.

Tánluán also had a strong impact on Daochuo, who once visited his temple. His work also influenced Shandao.

Tánluán's discussion of self-power and other-power clearly influenced the Japanese Pure Land traditions, who emphasize the other-power of the Buddha Amitabha as the only cause of rebirth in the Pure Land. As such, Tánluán was seen by Hōnen and Shinran as the founder of Pure Land Buddhism in China. Tánluán's works were very influential on the Japanese Jōdo Shinshū school since they were relied upon by Shinran in his writings.

== Literature ==
- Ducor, Jérôme. Tanluan: Commentaire au Traité de la naissance dans la Terre Pure de Vasubandhu, (Bibliothèque chinoise, vol. 31); Paris, Les Belles Lettres, 2021; 310 pp. (ISBN 978-2-251-45089-6)
- Inagaki, Hisao: T'an-luan's Commentary on Vasubandhu's Discourse on the Pure Land, A Study and Translation [T. 40, 1819]; Kyōto, Nagata Bunshōdō, 1998.
- Jones, Charles B. (2019) Chinese Pure Land Buddhism, Understanding a Tradition of Practice, University of Hawai‘i Press / Honolulu.
- Shinkō Mochizuki, Leo M. Pruden, Trans. (2000). Pure Land Buddhism in China: A Doctrinal History, Chapter 7: T'an-luan. In: Pacific World Journal, Third Series, Number 2, 149–165. Archived from the original
- Yukio Yamada (2000). "T'an-luan's Theory of Two Kinds of Dharma-body as Found in Shinran's Wago Writings", Pacific World Journal, Third Series, Number 2, 99-113. Archived from the original
- Ryusei Takeda (2000). The Theoretical Structure of "Birth in the Pure Land": Based on the Meaning of T'an-luan's "Birth through Causal Conditions", Pacific World Journal, Third Series, Number 2, 31–60. Archived from the original
- Shoji Matsumoto (1986). The Modern Relevance of Donran's Pure Land Buddhist Thought, Pacific World Journal, New Series 2, 36-41
