= Shinjin =

Concept in Japanese Pure Land Buddhism

Shinjin (信心) is a central concept in Japanese Pure Land Buddhism which indicates a state of mind which totally entrusts oneself to Amida Buddha's other-power (Japanese: tariki), having utterly abandoned any form of self effort (jiriki) or calculation (hakarai). The term has been variously translated as "faith", "entrusting heart", "true entrusting", "mind of true faith", and so on. It is also often left untranslated in English language publications on Shin Buddhism. It is a key concept in the thought of Shinran (1173–1263), the founder of Jōdo Shinshū. Shinran's concept of shinjin is rooted in the concept of faith found in Indian Pure Land scriptures and in the teachings of the Chinese Pure Land Buddhist masters Tanluan and Shandao, who also emphasized the importance of faith in Amitābha Buddha.

The term Shinjin (Chinese: Xìnxīn) is also used in other Buddhist traditions occasionally, though not as commonly as in Pure Land. The influential early Chan Buddhist poem Xìnxīn Míng (Faith-Mind Inscription) is one example.

== Indian precedents ==
The original Sanskrit term that was translated into shinjin was prasanna-cittā. In Buddhist Hybrid Sanskrit and in Pali, prasanna (Pali: pasanna) can indicate belief, trust or faith (according to Edgerton Buddhist Hybrid Sanskrit Dictionary, p. 388; and the Pali Text Society's Pali-English Dictionary), thus the term can mean "faithful mind". However, the term prasanna also means "clarity" and "pure" in Sanskrit, thus the term can also mean "clear mind" or "pure mind". Furthermore, the term can also mean pleased, peaceful, serene, delighted, happy. Thus, prasanna may have had multiple connotations.

The term prasanna-cittā appears in a key passage of the Amitayus Sutra which discusses the 18th vow of Amitabha Buddha (when he was Dharmakara bodhisattva). This passage is central to Pure Land Buddhist through, for it discusses the fundamental vow (hongan) of Amitabha. The standard Chinese edition of Saṅghavarman states:

If, when I attain buddhahood, sentient beings in the lands of the ten directions who sincerely and joyfully entrust themselves [prasanna-cittā] to me, desire to be born in my land, and think of me even ten times should not be born there, may I not attain perfect enlightenment. Excluded, however, are those who commit the five grave offenses and abuse the Right Dharma.

Luis O. Gomez, translating from the Sanskrit, uses "serene trust" for prasanna-cittā. In the Dasabhumikavibhāsā attributed to Nagarjuna, 信心 xìnxīn is used in the following passage:

If a person sows roots of good but still harbors doubts, the flower petals will not open. For the person of pure xìnxīn, the flower will open and he will see the Buddha.

Another synonymous term is cittaprasāda (settled faith, pure faith). According to the Dà zhì dù lùn, cittaprasāda can be attained by sentient beings through the actions of the Buddha:

All his bodily actions, all his vocal actions and all his mental actions accompany knowledge (sarvāṇi kāyavāgmanaskarmāṇi jñānānuparivartini). – In the Buddha, all bodily, vocal and mental actions are preceded by knowledge (jñānapūrvaṃgama) and, subsequently, accompany knowledge (jñānānuparivartin). Of all the bodily, vocal or mental actions of the Buddha, there is not one that is not useful to beings: this is why it is said that his actions are preceded by knowledge and accompany knowledge. Thus it is said in a sūtra: "In the Buddhas, even the out breath (praśvāsa) and the in breath (āśvāsa) are useful to beings." How, then, would their bodily, vocal and mental actions not be useful to them? The wicked who smell the perfume (gandha) of the breath (ānāpāna) of the Buddha obtain pure faith (cittaprasāda) and love the Buddha.

In Bodhiruci's translation of Vasubandhu's Upadeśa on the Sūtra of Amitāyus Buddha (無量壽經優波提舍), the term 信心 is used in the following passage:

How does one contemplate? How does one produce pure faith [信心]? If a good man or woman practices the Five Gates of Mindfulness and if that person's practice is perfected, ultimately that person will obtain birth in the Land of Peace and Bliss and will see Amida Buddha. What are the Five Gates of Mindfulness? The first is the Gate of Worship. The second is the Gate of Praise. The third is the Gate of Aspiration. The fourth is the Gate of Contemplation. The fifth is the Gate of Merit Transference.

Furthermore, Vasubandhu speaks of three key qualities bodhisattvas cultivate to achieve birth in the Pure Land: (1) the undefiled pure mind that does not seek anything, (2) the peaceful pure mind that seeks to eliminate suffering in all beings, (3) the blissful pure mind which seeks to bring all beings to Buddhahood. Vasubandhu also goes on to state that "the above-mentioned three types of minds, namely, the undefiled pure mind, the peaceful pure mind and the blissful pure mind are condensed into one which is the perfection of the exquisite, blissful, superior and true mind". He also states that this comprises Wisdom (Prajña), Compassion and Expediency (Upaya).

== Precedents in Chinese Buddhism ==
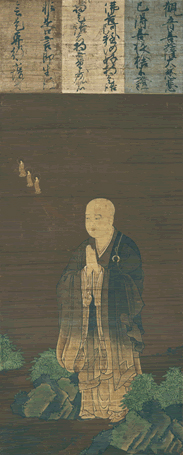
Illustration of Shandao (Ōtani University Museum)

In Chinese Buddhism, the term 信心 (Xìnxīn) and other related compounds (such as 信心門, xìnxīn mén, "gate of the faith mind") appear in various sources like the Mahāparinirvāṇasūtra and the Shi Moheyan Lun (釋摩訶衍論, a commentary to the Awakening of Faith). Various Chinese Mahayana sutras contain related terms for faith, such as jìng xìnxīn (淨信心, serene faith mind) which appears in the Mahāratnakūṭasūtra and xìnxīn qīngjìng (信心清淨; "pure faith mind") which appears in various Prajñaparamita sutras like the Diamond Sutra.

In Chinese Pure Land Buddhism, faith in the Buddha Amitābha and his power to transport all beings to the Pure Land was a central element. It was discussed by various Pure Land masters, including Tanluan and Shandao.

=== Tanluan ===
The Chinese Pure Land patriarch Tanluan gives faith a central role for the practice of Pure Land Buddhism. According to Tanluan, reciting the names of the Buddha Amitabha has the power to eliminate ignorance and satisfy all of one's aspirations. However, some people are not in true union with the name of the Buddha and this is because of a lack of faith. If one's faith is not honest, definitive, continuous and one-pointed, then one will not be able to attain union (相應 xiāngyìn, or "association", "to be bound to", yoga) with the true meaning of the Buddha's name.

=== Shandao's triple mind of faith ===
The central concept of Pure Land faith taught by Shandao is the triple mind or "three minds" (三心), which is the mental attitude needed to attain birth in the Pure Land of Amitabha. The "Three Minds" are found in Shandao's extant works, like his commentary on the Amitayus Contemplation Sutra (Guan Wuliangshou Jing 觀無量壽經) and in his Hymns in Praise of Birth (Wangsheng Lizan Ji, 往生礼讃). They are also listed in the Contemplation Sutra and taught by other Chinese commentators like Jingying Huiyuan. According to Shandao, the "Three Minds" represent three qualities necessary for practitioners seeking birth in the Pure Land of Amitābha Buddha. They are:

1. The Sincere Mind (至誠心, zhicheng xin): This mind embodies the quality of complete sincerity and authenticity in one's trust in Amitābha Buddha. For Shandao, sincerity here means aligning one's intention entirely with Amitābha's vow to liberate beings. It implies an earnest and wholehearted commitment without pretense.
2. The Deep Mind (深心, shen xin): This mind reflects a profound trust and belief in the effectiveness of Amitābha's power and vow. Shandao interprets this as unwavering confidence that Amitābha's vow can indeed enable rebirth in the Pure Land. It also involves deep humility, recognizing one's own limitations and the inability to attain liberation through self-effort alone.
3. The Mind Aspiring for Rebirth (迴向發願心, huixiang fayuan xin): Often translated as "Aspiring-for-Rebirth Mind," this is the sincere desire and intention to be born in Amitābha's Pure Land. This mind also involves dedicating all merits accumulated from one's practices, thoughts, and deeds to this purpose.

Shandao emphasized the importance of these three qualities as internal states that align the practitioner with Amitābha's vow. By cultivating these three mental attitudes, Shandao taught that one could ensure rebirth in the Pure Land regardless of one's level of doctrinal understanding or meditation skill.

== Japanese Pure Land ==
Shinjin (信心, often translated as "true entrusting" or "mind of true faith") is a general Japanese Buddhist term used in other traditions, especially in Japanese Pure Land Buddhism. Hōnen 法然 (1133–1212), the founder of Jōdo-shū and Shinran's teacher, discussed the idea of Shinjin basing himself on the teaching of Shandao about the threefold mind (sanshin 三心 ). However, the term Shinjin is particularly associated with the Jōdo Shinshū teaching of Shinran, in which it becomes the central and singular element of a person's liberation.

=== Hōnen ===
Hōnen generally follows Shandao's explanation of the threefold mind or threefold devotional heart and exhorts his followers to "cultivate the threefold devotional heart". Hōnen explains the threefold mind as follows:

Put succinctly, the Three-fold Devotional Heart is nothing more than just the earnest desire for birth in the Pure Land. The wish for birth in the Pure Land, truthfully and without pretension, is called the "Genuine Heart." The purity of this heart, which bears no doubt even for a moment that the vocal Nembutsu leads to Buddha Amitabha to come to welcome one at the time of death, is called the "Profound Heart." One's desire to be born in that Pure Land and to transfer one's accumulated merits of practice and wholesome deeds for Ojo (birth in the Pure Land) are called the "Heart Aspiring Ojo through the Transference of Merit." In short, if one wishes for birth in the Pure Land with purity of heart, one will by nature embody the Three-fold Devotional Heart.

Furthermore, according to Hōnen, the triple mind is "the heart of the essential vow, which Amida Buddha made when he was a bodhisattva Dharmakara". He also writes that it is not necessary to have some deep scholarly understanding to develop this faith, since:

The threefold devotional heart was designed for even the most ignorant. Those who are not even aware of the name of the threefold devotional heart can also possess the three parts of it without knowing anything about them. Accordingly when one hears that Amida Buddha will certainly receive us into the Pure land through total reliance on him and the single-hearted recitation of his name – if, with deep faith in these words without questioning, one desires to be welcomed by him and recites his name – one will embody the threefold devotional heart naturally because one's heart is in accordance with the threefold devotional heart.

Hōnen also taught that there are two types of the threefold heart: "the threefold devotional heart that encompasses wisdom and the threefold devotional heart that encompasses practice". The threefold heart of faith which encompasses wisdom is developed gradually through study of the Pure Land scriptures. The threefold heart of practice meanwhile is "devotion in the recitation of nembutsu, unshakable faith, and aspiration for birth in the Pure Land."

=== In Shinran and Jōdo Shinshū ===
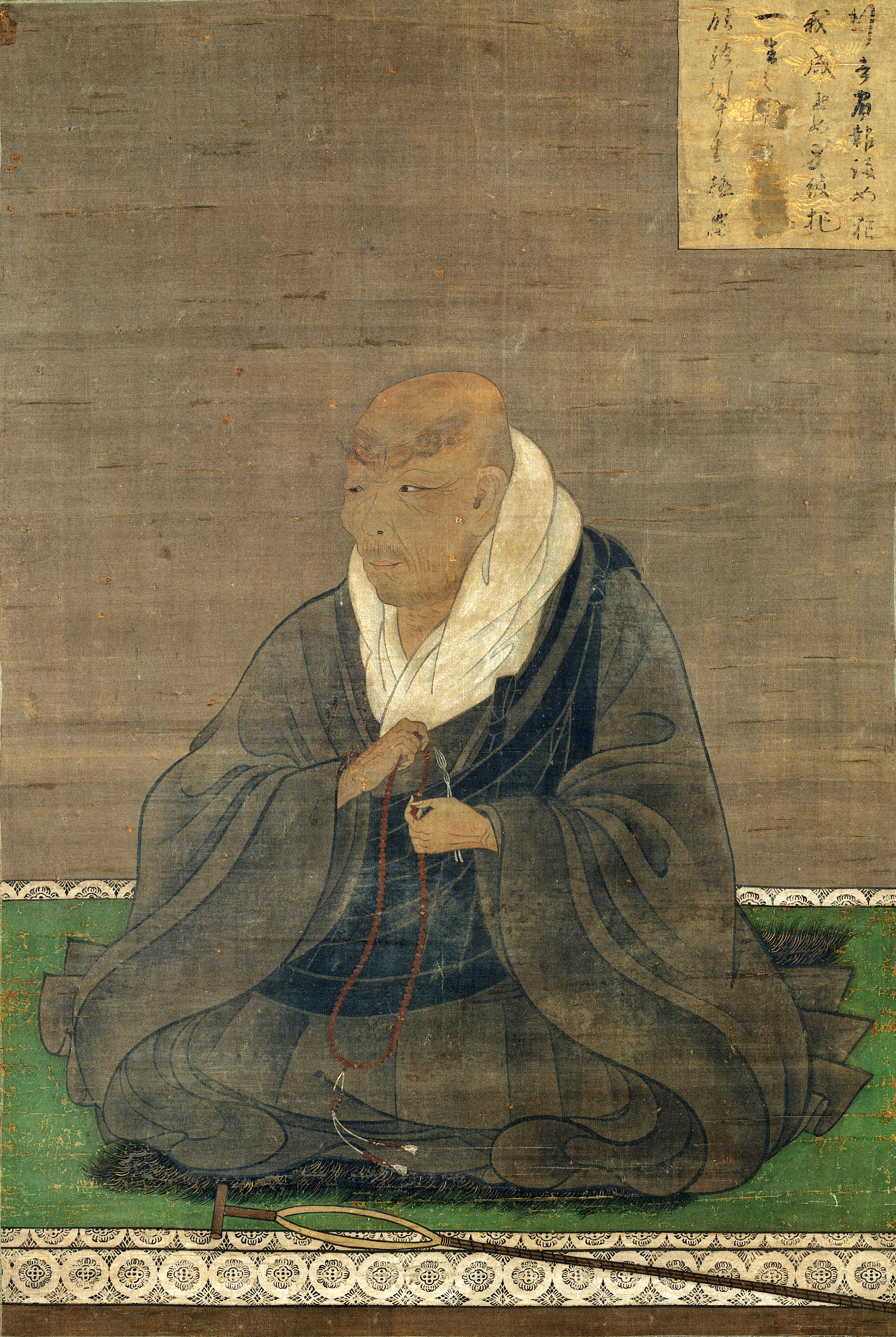
Shinran (Nara National Museum)

Shinjin became a major element in the teachings of Shinran, who is credited with transforming and systematizing Pure Land beliefs into the school of Jōdo Shinshū (浄土真宗, "True Pure Land School"). For Shinran, Shinjin represented a radical interpretation of faith as total reliance on Amitābha (Japanese: Amida) Buddha's saving vow, contrasting with the traditional Buddhist emphasis on self-power (jiriki 自力) practices such as meditation and ethical perfection. Furthermore, Shinran saw shinjin as the essence of Pure Land Buddhism, as he states in Notes on 'Essentials of Faith Alone: "Know that the true essence of the Pure Land teaching is that when we realize true and real shinjin, we are born in the true fulfilled land".

According to the Shinran, all the various mental qualities discussed by the past masters like Vasubandhu (who speaks of the undefiled mind, the peaceful mind and the blissful mind, as well as the five mindfulnesses) and Shandao (who teaches the three minds), are really all aspects of one quality, Shinjin. Shinran draws on passages in Vasubandhu's Upadeśa on the Sūtra of Amitāyus where he speaks of the "single mind" or "single mindedness" to support this position.

In Shinran's Jōdo Shinshū tradition of Pure Land, shinjin denotes an absolute and singular entrustment in Amitābha's Primal Vow (Japanese: hongan), which promises salvation to all beings who sincerely call upon his name (Nembutsu). Shinjin refers to a unified state of faith, trust, and humility. However, Shinjin is not just trust, it is a multifaceted phenomenon which Shinran describes as follows:

We see clearly that sincere mind is the mind that is the seed of truth, reality, and sincerity; hence, it is completely untainted by the hindrance of doubt. Entrusting is the mind full of truth, reality, and sincerity; the mind of ultimacy, accomplishment, reliance, and reverence; the mind of discernment, distinctness, clarity, and faithfulness; the mind of aspiration, wish, desire, and exultation; the mind of delight, joy, gladness, and happiness; hence, it is completely untainted by the hindrance of doubt. Aspiration for birth is the mind of wish, desire, awakening, and awareness; the mind of accomplishment, fulfillment, performance, and establishment. It is the mind of great compassion directing itself to beings; hence, it is completely untainted by the hindrance of doubt. Here, in considering the literal meanings of the terms for them, we find that the three minds are the mind of truth and reality, free of any taint of falsity; they are the mind right and straightforward, free of any taint of wrong and deceit. Truly we know, then, that this is called shinjin* because it is untainted by the hindrance of doubt. Shinjin* is the mind that is single. The mind that is single is shinjin that is true and real.

Thus, Shinjin has other dimensions besides devotion and trust, including a joyful aspect, aspiration, lack of doubt, and wisdom or discernment.

==== As Amitabha's mind ====
The ultimate dimension of shinjin is that it is non-dual with Amitabha Buddha. Shinran taught that true Shinjin is not self-generated but rather is a gift of grace granted by Amitābha, who is always calling out to beings to guide them to the Pure Land. Thus, James C. Dobbins writes:

For Shinran, faith is not the believer's individual act of volition, a conscious decision in favor of Amida and Pure Land; instead, it is a state wherein humanly contrived choices cease and one reposes effortlessly in Amida's embrace. Amida's mind and purpose become one's own mind and purpose. In fact, faith is none other than Amida's mind transmuted in the person.

According to Yoshifumi Ueda, "Shinjin is the mind of Amida Buddha given to and realized in a person. Shinran interprets shin (信) to mean truth, reality, sincerity; jin (心) means mind. When shinjin is realized, Amida's mind (wisdom and compassion) and the practitioners mind of blind passions become one." This non-dual view of shinjin is expressed in different ways by Shinran. For example, he equates shinjin with Buddha nature:

Buddha-nature is great shinjin. Why? Because through shinjin the bodhisattva-mahasattva has acquired all the paramitas from charity to wisdom. All sentient beings will without fail ultimately realize great shinjin. Therefore it is taught, "All sentient beings are possessed of Buddha-nature.

Shinran also writes: "Faith means single-mindedness. Single-mindedness means the indestructible mind. The indestructible mind (vajra mind) means the mind aspiring for complete enlightenment [bochicitta]. This is in fact the Other-power [of Amida at work], which supersedes all other-power."

==== Shinjin and practice ====
Since in Shin Buddhism, Shinjin is none other than the Buddha's power working through one, the actual details of how one practices Buddhism and recites the name of the Buddha (nembutsu) are not important (such as frequency, manner, occasion, intonation etc.), what matters is whether one has truly settled shinjin, or whether one's faith is not yet truly settled.

Shinran emphasized that Shinjin is not something that can be cultivated or forced through personal effort; rather, it is an expression of Amitābha's compassion and power (tariki 他力, "other-power"). This faith requires abandoning all reliance on self-power and recognizing one's own limitations and karmic burdens. Shinran also expressed that Shinjin arises through deep personal reflection and listening to the teachings: "Again, there are two kinds of shinjin, one arises from hearing (mon) and the other from reflection (shi)." Shinran warns that shinjin which is not based on both is an "imperfect realization of shinjin".

Thus, on hearing the Pure Land teachings, shinjin can arise as a complete surrender to Amitābha's vow as a sense of relying solely on other-power without any calculation, contrivance (Japanese: hakarai) or self effort on the devotee's part. This means that making strenuous effort to perform Buddhist practices (such as good works, precepts, intensive chanting of nembutsu, etc.) are not actually helpful in attaining shinjin and birth in the Pure Land.

Indeed, for Shinran, once Shinjin is attained, further practices or rites are not necessary for rebirth in the Pure Land, as the practitioner's liberation is already assured through Amitābha's vow. This teaching diverges significantly from traditional Buddhist practice models and emphasizes a form of Pure Land Buddhism that is available to all, regardless of their spiritual capacity, since it does not rely on personal effort or skill. This does not mean that those who receive Shinjin do not do any practices however. It only means that those with Shinjin perform traditional Pure Land practices, like recitation of nembutsu and chanting sutras, out of a sense of gratitude to Amitabha. They therefore practice spontaneously and naturally, not out of a sense of calculation or out of a feeling that they need to do so to attain some kind of result like birth in the Pure Land.

According to Shinran, for a person with shinjin, the act of saying the nembutsu is actually done by the Buddha's vow power, not by their own intent. As Dobbins writes "When a person of faith says the name, it is a tangible sign of Amida at work in the person." This means that a person with shinjin will say the nembutsu automatically, since this is equivalent to shinjin. This is what Shinran calls the "great practice" given to us by Amida Buddha which is not dependent on our own will. As Shinran says in the Tannishō:

When the thought of saying the Nembutsu emerges decisively from within, having entrusted ourselves to the inconceivable power of Amida's vow which saves us, enabling us to be born in the Pure Land, in that very moment we receive the ultimate benefit of being grasped never to be abandoned.

==== Settled shinjin ====
As Ueda notes a key distinction in Shinran's writings is between those who have not attained truly settled Shinjin and those who have If one's shinjin is not truly settled and one is unsure of one's birth in the pure land, Shinran states that one should "to begin with, say the nembutsu in aspiration for birth". He also exhorts all people to "give yourselves up to Amida's entrusting with sincere mind" and "free yourself of self-power calculation". Furthermore, in the Shin tradition, one way to open oneself up to true shinjin in the Buddha is through "deeply listening" (monpo) to the teachings, the Buddha's Dharma and the boundless call of Amitabha Buddha (which is the nembutsu), which is also called "deep hearing of the light". Regarding what kind of attitude one should have while reciting the nembutsu, Shinran also writes that the Pure Land Buddhist should "thinking of the Buddha's benevolence, devote himself to the nembutsu in order to respond with gratitude for that benevolence, and should hope for peace in the world and the spread of the Buddha Dharma."

Once Shinjin has been attained, it may lead to feelings of gratitude and compassion. As Shinran writes "the waters of foolish beings' minds, both good and evil, are transformed into the mind of great compassion" (Shozomatsu wasan 40). This experience also means that a person of shinjin has the sense that their birth in the Pure Land is assured. Shinjin may also express itself as a desire to live in harmony with Buddhist precepts and teachings and to share the teachings with others as a way to repay the Buddha's kindness. This inner transformation is described by Shinran who writes "when we entrust ourselves to the Tathagata's Primal Vow, we, who are like bits of tile and pebbles, are turned into gold". As such, Daniel G. Friedrich, describes this transformation as one in which "that which is pure and good becomes one with that which is vile, evil, and impure".

However, for Shinran, shinjin does not lead to moral perfection here and now, rather Shinjin and our assurance of birth in the Pure Land (and thus, our future Buddhahood) happens within our own imperfection, corrupted experiences, and inclinations. Indeed, the encounter and acceptance of one's own corrupt and defiled self aids one's sense of faith in the Buddha's vow power, since in accepting this we come to realize that we cannot rely on our self-power, but must rely on Amida's power. This deep self-knowledge of one's own karmic evil, of the uselessness of one's self-power and the process of self-introspection in which one discovers our need for other-power, is central for the Shin Buddhist view of shinjin. Thus, the experience of shinjin is also an experience of the deep limitations of the sense of self and therefore in letting go of the self, one attains the true self, the true mind of Amitabha Budha (shinjitsushin), the buddha-nature, i.e. shinjin. Since it includes an aspect of knowledge and is non-dual with Amida's mind, this means that true shinjin is not just a devotional faith, but includes an element of prajña (wisdom). Thus, Shinran writes: "Know that since Amida's Vow is wisdom, the emergence of the mind of entrusting oneself to it is the arising of wisdom."

Shinjin is also described as a joyful experience, as Shinran writes: "when one attains the true and real practice and shinjin, one greatry rejoices in one's heart. This attainment is therefore called the stage of joy". Shinran also equates shinjin with stream entry.

=== Rennyo and anjin ===
Rennyo 蓮 如 (1415–1499) was the eighth head priest of the Honganji tradition. He was influential in transforming Jōdo Shin-shū into one of the largest Buddhist traditions of Japan. Rennyo teachings expanded and explained Shinran's concept of shinjin, though he rarely uses the term and instead uses the term anjin (案心, peace of mind) to describe the central experience of Shin Buddhism. Shin Buddhist scholars generally understand the term as being synonymous with Shinjin, but other scholars see them as distinct.

Rennyo explains Shinjin as follows:

Shinjin is [a matter of] clearly discerning the significance of Amida Buddha's Primal Vow and single-heartedly taking refuge in Amida; this we call decisive settlement of anjin. Therefore full realization of the significance of the six characters "na-mu-a-mi-da-butsu" [南無阿弥陀仏] is the substance of decisively settled faith. That is, the two characters "na-mu" indicate the receptive attitude of sentient beings who entrust themselves to Amida Buddha. Next, the four characters "a-mi-da-butsu" signify the dharma through which Amida Tathāgata saves sentient beings. This is expressed as "the oneness in 'namu- amida-butsu' of the person and dharma [ki-hō ittai no namu-amida-butsu 機法一体の南 無阿弥陀仏 ].

== Bibliography ==
- Kasulis, Thomas P. (1981). Review: Letters of Shinran: A Translation of Mattōshō. Volume I: Shin Buddhism Translation Series I by Yoshifumi Ueda, Philosophy East and West 31 (2), 246–248
- Friedrich, Daniel G. (2008). Shinjin, Faith, and Entrusting Heart : Notes on the Presentation of Shin Buddhism in English, 大阪女学院大学紀要 5, 107–117
- Lee, Kenneth D. (2004). Comparative Analysis of Shinran's Shinjin and Calvin's Faith, Buddhist-Christian Studies 24, 171–190 JSTOR 4145572 (subscription required)
- Ueda, Yoshifumi (1981). Response to Thomas P. Kasulis' Review of "Letters of Shinran", Philosophy East and West 31 (4), 507–511 JSTOR 1398796 (subscription required)
- Rogers, Minor L. (1980). Review: Letters of Shinran: A Translation of Mattosho, by Yoshifumi Ueda. Notes on 'Essentials of Faith Alone': A Translation of Shinran's by Yuishinsho-mon'i., by Yoshifumi Ueda. Monumenta Nipponica 35 (4), 508–511 JSTOR 2384432 (subscription required)
