= Dasabhumika-vibhāsā =

The Dasabhumika-vibhāsā (Chinese: Shízhù pípōshā lùn, 十住毘婆沙論, Taisho no. 1521) also known as the Ten Stages Treatise (十住論) is a Buddhist Treatise on the Daśabhūmika-sūtra attributed to Nāgārjuna. The treatise only survives in a seventeen fascicle Chinese translation completed by the Kuchean translator monk Kumārajīva (344–413). Kumārajīva is said to have received the text from Buddhayaśas, who recited the work. The original Sanskrit text has not been preserved, nor is there any other surviving translations into other languages.

The Ten Stages Treatise is a work on the bodhisattva path, focusing on the essential practices for entering the first two bodhisattva stages (bhūmi). The text also contains an influential passage which discusses the difficulty of the traditional bodhisattva path and an alternative method to liberation which is based on Buddha recollection (Buddhānusmṛti). This passage was significantly influential on the Pure Land Buddhist tradition which emphasized the practice of nianfo, meditation on Amitabha Buddha, especially via the recitation of his name.

== Overview ==
According to tradition, Nāgārjuna received the Buddhāvataṃsaka Sūtra (which contains the Daśabhūmika-sūtra) from the palace of the Naga king under the ocean. He then composed a great treatise on it.

Though traditionally attributed to Nāgārjuna, scholars are unsure of authenticity of the Treatise on the Ten Stages and there has been some debate over this issue. This is due to a lack of a Sanskrit original and also due to the fact that it is unknown in the Indo-Tibetan tradition. Nevertheless, Christian Lindtner in his study of Nāgārjuna's writings considers that it is likely authentic. Chinese catalogues also note that an earlier Chinese translation was completed by Dharmarakṣa in the 3rd century, but this translation is now lost. The Chinese scholar Yinshun also supported the authenticity of the Treatise.

Internal evidence from the surviving translation also indicates that the original work may have been longer (and discussed the other bodhisattva stages). However, according to a colophon in the text, the reciter Buddhayaśas "did not recite it" and so it was not included in Kumārajīva's edition.

=== Overview of the chapters ===
Nāgārjuna's Dababhūmika-vibhāṣā consists of 35 chapters in 17 fascicles, offering a detailed exposition on the principles and practices essential for entering the bodhisattva path and the stages (bhūmis). It focuses on the first two bodhisattva stages taught in the Daśabhūmika Sūtra: The Stage of Joyfulness (pramuditā-bhūmi 歡喜地) and The Stage of Stainlessness (vimalā-bhūmi 離垢地).

The basic structure of the Daśabhūmika Treatise's chapters is as follows:

- Chapter 1 provides an introduction, explaining the author's motivations and the purpose of the treatise.
- Entering the First Stage (Chapter 2): Introduction to the ten bodhisattva grounds and the significance of The Ground of Joyfulness.
- Characteristics of the First Stage Bodhisattva (Chapter 3): Discusses the joyful nature and fearlessness of bodhisattvas on this level.
- Purification of the First Stage (Chapter 4): The 27 dharmas involved in its purification.
- Bodhisattva Vows (Chapter 5): A detailed explanation of the ten great bodhisattva vows.
- Generating Bodhicitta (Chapter 6): Causes and conditions leading to bodhicitta.
- Obstacles and Stability on the Path (Chapters 7–8): Discusses challenges to maintaining bodhicitta, transgressions on the path, and the qualities of an irreversible bodhisattva (avaivartika).
- Easy Practice (Chapter 9): A very influential section which discusses the "Easy Practice" way to achieve the stage of irreversibility or non-retrogression (see below)
- Karmic Purification and Merit (Chapters 10–13): Repentance, merit transference, and distinctions in the two main types of giving (giving things and giving of the Dharma).
- Taking Refuge and Ethical Conduct (Chapters 14–17): The practice of taking refuge in the Three Jewels, the five precepts, faults of lay life, and the observances of both lay and monastic bodhisattvas.
- Practices Common to All Bodhisattvas (Chapters 18–19): Discusses disciplines shared by lay and monastic bodhisattvas (such as patience, giving of Dharma, contemplation, making offerings, resolute faith, cultivating emptiness, right vows), the karmic causes of the Buddha's physical characteristics, and various fourfold classifications of wisdom.
- Buddha Mindfulness and Exclusive Buddha Dharmas (Chapters 20–25): These chapters focus on mindfulness of the Buddhas (Buddhānusmṛti), methods for attaining pratyutpanna samādhi, lists of qualities exclusive to Buddhas, and their relevance for practice.
- Bodhisattva Path Analogies (Chapter 26): Includes a simile of a guide leading travelers across treacherous terrain.
- Summary of the First Stage Practices (Chapter 27): This chapter provides a summary of all bodhisattva practices discussed previously, and provides a distinction between nominal and true bodhisattvas.
- Transition to the Second Bodhisattva Stage (Chapters 28–35): This last section includes the following topics:
  - Karmic actions leading to advancement.
  - Differences between the paths of śrāvakas, pratyekabuddhas, and bodhisattvas.
  - The superiority of the Mahāyāna path.
  - Moral discipline, the dhūta austerities, purification of virtue, and the karmic rewards of ethical conduct.
  - The second stage bodhisattva's role as a wheel-turning king instructing beings in moral cultivation.

=== Eight key practices for entering the first stage ===
In chapter 2, Nāgārjuna discusses eight key Dharmas or practices for entering the first bodhisattva stage, they are:

1. Densely Planting One’s Roots of Goodness
  - Cultivating and accumulating all meritorious qualities in accordance with Dharma.
  - Avoiding the influences of greed, hatred, and delusion.
2. Thoroughly Practicing the Practices
  - Upholding ethical precepts.
  - Practicing in the correct sequence with seven essential dharmas (shame, dread of blame, extensive learning, vigor, mindfulness, wisdom, and pure livelihood).
  - Utilizing dhyāna (meditative absorption) as a supporting practice.
3. Well Accumulating All the Provisions
  - Gathering all necessary factors for the path, including the seven essential dharmas and fundamental good practices.
  - Cultivating additional virtues such as giving, patience, endurance, courage. satisfaction and fondness for solitude and avoiding bad ones like flattery, resentment, attachment, cruelty, negligence, arrogance, and self-praise.
4. Thoroughly Making Offerings to All Buddhas
  - Making offerings in two ways: Listening well to the Mahayana Dharma and Offering the four requisites (food, clothing, medicine, and shelter) to Buddhas with reverence and service.
5. Being Protected by the Good Spiritual Friend
  - Receiving guidance and encouragement from Buddhas, bodhisattvas, or śrāvakas who teach the Mahayana and the pāramitās and keep one from falling away from the path.
6. Completely Developing Resolute Intentions
  - Developing deep delight in the Buddha Vehicle and the Mahayana Dharma.
7. Becoming Compassionately Mindful of Beings
  - Cultivating profound compassion for all beings, and a wish relieve their suffering.
8. Having Resolute Faith in the Unsurpassable Dharma
  - Establishing unshakable faith in the Buddha’s teachings and their ultimate efficacy.

Then, Nāgārjuna adds that a bodhisattva is ready to make the bodhisattva vow, in which one resolves “after I have achieved my own liberation, I shall [return and] liberate beings”.

Nāgārjuna then describes the nature of the bodhisattva who has entered the first stage:

The bodhisattva who abides on the first ground has much that he is able to endure. He is not fond of struggle or disputation, and, for the most part, his mind is joyous and pleased. He always delights in purity. He has a compassionate mind and feels pity for beings. He has no thoughts of hatred or anger, and, for the most part, practices these seven things.

=== Ten bodhisattva vows ===
The Treatise contains its own set of bodhisattva vows:

1. "I vow to make offerings to, supply the needs of, and extend reverence to all buddhas."
2. "I vow that in every case I shall protect and uphold the Dharma of all buddhas.", also "I should guard and protect the Dharma of all past, future, and present buddhas of the ten directions."
3. "From that time when all buddhas depart from the Tuṣita Heaven and come back to abide in the world, on forward to the conclusion of their teaching and their eternal entry into the realm [of nirvāṇa] without residue...I vow that in all cases I shall completely devote my mind to making offerings to them [the Buddhas]".
4. "I vow to engage in the transformative teaching of beings, causing them all to enter the paths."
5. "I vow to enable all beings’ complete realization of the Buddha’s bodhi even where there are those tending toward śrāvaka-disciple or pratyekabuddha paths."
6. "Through resolute faith, I vow to cause all dharmas to enter [a state of] uniform equality." This means that "one causes all of these dharmas to enter into the gates of emptiness, signlessness, and wishlessness so that they are realized to be uniformly equal and beyond duality."
7. "Having vowed to purify the buddhalands, I shall therefore extinguish all the various forms of evil."
8. "When joining together with others in doing any single endeavor, I vow that there will be no enmity or contentiousness."
9. "I vow to practice the bodhisattva path and set turning the irreversible wheel, thereby enabling the dispelling of all afflictions and the entry into faith that is pure."
10. "I vow that, in all worlds, I shall manifest the realization of bodhi."

=== Buddha contemplation ===
The Dashabhūmika-vibhāṣā is also known for its contribution to the development of the practice of Buddha recollection (Buddhānusmṛti), which is said to lead to the visionary experience of pratyutpanna samādhi ("the samādhi in which the Buddhas of the present appear before one") which allows a bodhisattva to see "right before one’s very eyes...the buddhas of the ten directions" and "listen to the Dharma of the sutras being taught by those buddhas."

The practice of Buddha recollection has a special role in the Treatise, since according to the third chapter, it is one of the main reason why the Buddhas at the first bodhisattva stage (the stage of joy) are joyful:

He is always mindful of the Buddhas, of the great dharmas of the Buddhas, of those at the station of certain success, and of their rare practices. It is because of this that he is for the most part joyful. As for his “being mindful of the Buddhas,” he is mindful of Burning Lamp and the other buddhas of the past, is mindful of Amitābha and the other buddhas of the present, and is mindful of Maitreya and the other buddhas of the future. He “is always mindful” of them just as if they were appearing directly in front of him and realizes that, throughout the three realms of existence, there is no one able to be superior to them. It is for this reason that he is mostly joyful.

Aside from the discussion in the "Easy Path" chapter (9), the Treatise discusses the practice of Buddha recollection in numerous other chapters, including chapter 18 on shared practices (which discusses Contemplation of the Buddha's thirty two marks of a great man), and chapters 20 to 25 of the Treatise discuss various aspects of Buddhānusmṛti.

The Treatise explains the practice of Buddha recollection in depth, offering a structured and progressive approach to cultivating mindfulness of the Buddha. Nāgārjuna outlines four primary methods of Buddha recollection: reciting the Buddha’s name (chiming nianfo), visualizing the Buddha’s marks (guanxiang nianfo), contemplating the Buddha’s virtues (guanxiang nianfo), and realizing the Buddha’s true reality (shixiang nianfo). Each method serves as a skillful means to purify the mind, deepen concentration, and ultimately lead practitioners toward the realization of the Buddha’s Dharma body, the true nature of reality. In the Treatise, these practices are interlinked, with each method building upon the previous one to guide practitioners from coarse to subtle levels of understanding.

The first method (reciting Buddha names), involves the vocal or mental repetition of the names of the Buddhas. This practice is particularly suited to beginners, as it uses sound to focus the mind and gather scattered thoughts. Nāgārjuna emphasizes that reciting the Buddha’s name is not merely a mechanical repetition but should be accompanied by faith and reverence. By recollecting the Buddha’s virtues and merits through his name, practitioners cultivate a pure mind and accumulate merit, which helps them progress toward the stage of non-retrogression (avaivartika). This method is accessible and effective, making it a cornerstone of the “easy path” to enlightenment, as discussed in the Chapter on Easy Practice.

The second and third methods, "visualizing the Buddha’s marks" and "contemplating the Buddha’s virtues", involve deeper levels of mental engagement. Visualizing the Buddha’s thirty-two major marks and eighty minor characteristics helps practitioners refine their samadhi and develop a vivid mental image of the Buddha surrounded by a great assembly. This practice is not merely about imagining physical forms but also about understanding the karmic causes and virtues represented by these marks, which the sutra discusses in extensive detail. For example, the Buddha’s golden skin symbolizes immeasurable virtues, while his long arms represent boundless generosity. By contemplating these marks, practitioners internalize the Buddha’s qualities and cultivate corresponding virtues in their own lives. Nāgārjuna highlights that these practices gradually transform the mind, turning defilements into purity and aligning the practitioner’s actions with the bodhisattva path.

The ultimate goal of Buddha recollection is "contemplating the Buddha as ultimate reality" (shixiang nianfo), which involves understanding the emptiness and dependent origination of all phenomena. Nāgārjuna explains that true Buddha recollection transcends attachment to physical forms or even the Dharma body. This practice is deeply connected to the bodhisattva’s cultivation of wisdom and compassion, as it requires seeing the true nature of reality while engaging in the six perfections. By integrating the understanding of emptiness into every aspect of Buddha recollection, practitioners can transform their minds, accumulate the resources for the pure land, and ultimately attain Buddhahood.

=== The chapter on the Easy Path ===
The Treatise on the Ten Stages contains an influential chapter entitled “Chapter on Easy Practice” (yìxíng pǐn 易行品, chapter nine), which discusses Amitābha Buddha and his Pure Land as an "easy" method for attaining non-retrogression on the path for bodhisattvas discouraged by the more traditional bodhisattva path which lasts many eons (kalpas).

The Treatise begins its discussion of the "easy" path with the following:

There are innumerable gates to the buddha-dharma. Just as there are difficult and easy paths in this world, going over land being wearying while taking a boat over water is pleasant, just so are the bodhisattva paths.

The Treatise acknowledges the difficulty of attaining liberation through the traditional bodhisattva path, emphasizing the vast obstacles bodhisattvas face on the ten-stage path and the great risk of falling from the path in a future life, which would entail losing one's spiritual gains. For frail and timid bodhisattvas who do not feel able to accomplish the long traditional path, the Treatise recommends the “path of easy practice”:

If a bodhisattva wishes to attain to the stage of non-retrogression in this body and accomplish supreme highest enlightenment, he should contemplate (niàn 念) all the buddhas of the ten directions and invoke their names.

The Treatise then discusses various named Buddhas and their buddhalands which can be recited by a bodhisattva following this practice. It then singles out Amitābha Buddha and discusses that Buddha's land and qualities. Nāgārjuna then provides a set of verses in praise of Amitābha Buddha.

This perspective laid the foundation for later Chinese Pure Land thought, where the "Path of Sages" was deemed impractical for most beings in the degenerate age (末法, mòfǎ). Instead, reliance on Amitābha Buddha's compassionate vows was presented as an expedient means accessible to all. The chapter on easy practice was widely cited by Chinese Pure Land Buddhists who used it to establish the doctrinal distinction between the "Path of Sages" (聖道門, shèngdào mén) and the "Easy Path" (易行道, yìxíng dào). This framework later emphasized by figures such as Tánluán (曇鸞, 476–542), Dàochuò (道綽, 562–645) and Shàndǎo (善導, 613–681). For these major Pure Land thinkers, the "Path of Sages" refers to the arduous practice of self-powered (自力, zìlì) cultivation through wisdom, meditation, and moral discipline, leading to enlightenment over countless lifetimes. In contrast, the "Easy Path" entails reliance on the Other power (他力, tālì) of Amitābha Buddha, enabling rebirth in the Pure Land through faith and invocation of Amitābha's name (nianfo, 念佛).

The influence of the Treatise on the Ten Stages on the Pure Land Buddhist tradition extends into the Japanese Pure Land schools, particularly Jōdo-shū and Jōdo Shinshū. The figures key figures of these traditions, like Hōnen, Benchō and Shinran, inherited the doctrinal insights of Chinese Pure Land masters and emphasized Other Power and nembutsu (nianfo) as the primary means of liberation. These authors cited the chapter on the Easy Path in their works to show the orthodoxy of their Pure Land Buddhist views and even saw Nagarjuna as a patriarch of Pure Land Buddhism. The Treatise thus serves as a critical link between early Mahāyāna thought and the fully developed Pure Land tradition in East Asia.

=== Corrupt bodhisattvas and true bodhisattvas ===
A key theme in the Treatise is the distinction between different types of bodhisattvas, particularly those who are only nominally bodhisattvas (敗壞菩薩, "corrupt bodhisattvas" or "defective bodhisattvas") and those who genuinely embody the path (真實菩薩, "true bodhisattvas"). The corrupt bodhisattvas, despite having aroused bodhicitta (the intent to become a Buddha for the sake of all living beings), lack actual practice and embodiment of the path. Nāgārjuna likens them to horses that bear the name "horse" but lack the capacity to walk or function as such. These bodhisattvas fail to uphold the conduct expected of them and instead engage in actions such as teaching profound Dharma to those incapable of receiving it, giving inferior teachings to those who seek greater wisdom, showing disrespect to those who uphold moral discipline, and placing faith in untrustworthy individuals while forming close bonds with those who break precepts.

The Treatise also discusses false bodhisattvas (像菩薩, "semblance bodhisattvas") who engage in superficial acts of virtue but lack genuine dedication to contemplation, moral discipline, and the cultivation of wisdom. They are preoccupied with personal gain, social recognition, and attachment to worldly relationships, failing to embody the detachment and compassionate commitment of a true bodhisattva. In contrast, true bodhisattvas exhibit four harmonious qualities that define their path. They cultivate an equal mind toward all beings, instruct others with beneficial teachings, expound the Dharma universally, and uphold right conduct in all interactions. These bodhisattvas are committed to self-discipline, practice, and altruistic action. They avoid the mistakes of false corrupt bodhisattvas by ensuring that their teachings and relationships align with the path of enlightenment. The Treatise emphasizes that a true bodhisattva must sincerely engage in practices such as renouncing personal desires, cultivating great compassion, and seeking liberation for all beings while maintaining faith in karma and dependent origination.

== See also ==
- Discourse on the Pure Land
- Dà zhìdù lùn

== Sources ==
- Jones, Charles B. (2019). Chinese Pure Land Buddhism, Understanding a Tradition of Practice. Honolulu: University of Hawai‘i Press.
- Jones, Charles B. (2021). Pure Land: History, Tradition, and Practice. Shambhala Publications. ISBN 978-1-61180-890-2.
- Dharmamitra, Bhiksu (tr.). Nāgārjuna’s Treatise on the Ten Bodhisattva Grounds (Two Volumes) Seattle, WA: Kalavinka Press, 2012.
