= Ten Stages Sutra =

Sutra in Mahāyāna Buddhism

The Ten Stages Sutra (Sanskrit: Daśabhūmika Sūtra; simplified Chinese: 十地经; traditional Chinese: 十地經; pinyin: shí dì jīng; Tibetan: འཕགས་པ་ས་བཅུ་པའི་མདོ། Wylie: phags pa sa bcu pa'i mdo) also known as the Daśabhūmika Sūtra, is an early, influential Mahayana Buddhist scripture. The sutra also appears as the 26th chapter of the Avataṃsaka Sūtra. Modern Buddhist studies scholars generally hold that these Mahayana sūtras first began to appear between the 1st century BCE and the 1st century CE. They continued being composed, compiled and edited until the decline of Buddhism in India.

== Contents ==
In the Daśabhūmika Sūtra, the Buddha describes ten stages of development that a bodhisattva must progress through in order to accomplish full Enlightenment and Buddhahood, as well as the subject of Buddha-nature and the awakening of the aspiration for Enlightenment.

== Commentary ==
There is a commentary which survives in Chinese called the Daśabhūmikavibhāṣā, it is attributed to Nagarjuna.

Another commentary on the Daśabhūmika Sūtra, the Dasabhūmikabhāsya, was written by Vasubandhu in Sanskrit and translated into Chinese by Bodhiruci and others during the 6th century CE.

== Chinese Daśabhūmikā school ==
A Daśabhūmikā school said to have existed in China at one time, which centered on this sutra, but was later absorbed by the Huayan school, as the Huayan school's principal sutra, the Avataṃsaka Sūtra, already contains the Daśabhūmika Sūtra. The Daśabhūmika Sūtra can also be found in modified form in the thirty-ninth chapter as part of the journey of the bodhisattva Sudhana. Huayan remains a major tradition in contemporary Chinese Buddhism, and its doctrines also provides major foundational teachings for other existing Mahayana traditions, such as Chan/Zen.

== See also ==
- Chinese Buddhism
