= The Amitāyus Sutra =

Popular Sutra in Mahāyāna Buddhism

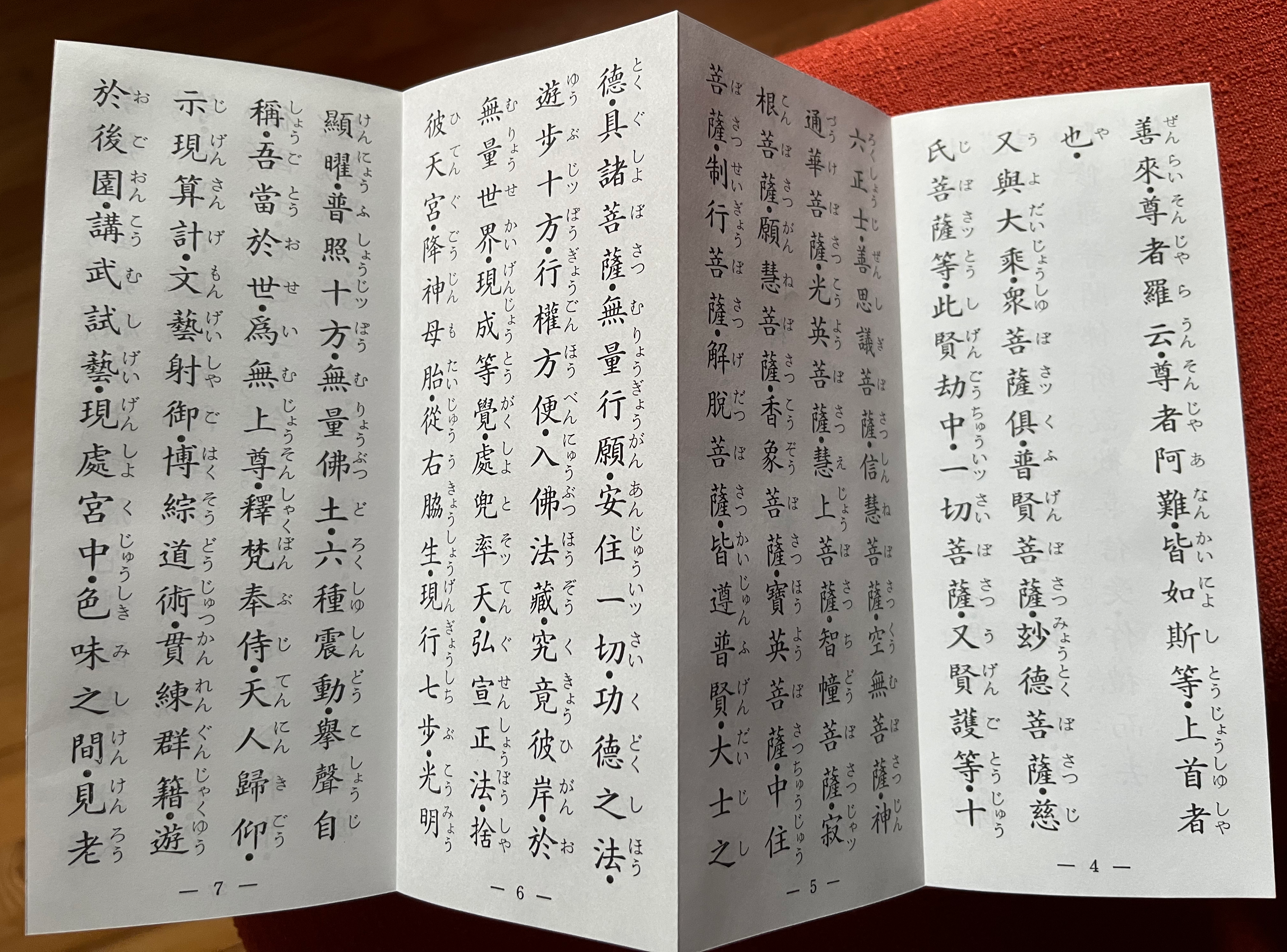
A sutra book (okyō) showing passages from the Sukhāvatīvyūha. Obtained from Nishi Honganji temple in Kyoto, Japan.

The Amitāyus Sutra (Sanskrit; "Sutra of Immeasurable Life"), also known as the Larger Sukhāvatīvyūhasūtra and the Amitābhavyūha (Array of Amitābha), is one of the two Indian Mahayana sutras surviving in Sanskrit which describe the pure land of Amitābha (also known as Amitāyus, "Measureless Life"), the other being the Amitābha Sūtra.

The Amitāyus Sutra contains the past-life tale of Dharmākara Bodhisattva, who would go on to become Buddha Amitābha. It also explains how he gave rise to the Original Vows which led to the creation of the Pure Land of Sukhavati. The title of the sutra is often translated in English as either the Sutra [on the Buddha] of Immeasurable Life, or simply the Immeasurable Life Sutra. The Immeasurable Life Sutra is one of the three central scriptures of East Asian Pure Land Buddhism, and is widely revered and chanted by Pure Land Buddhists throughout Asia.

== History and versions of the text ==
Some scholars believe that the Longer Sukhāvatīvyūha Sūtra was compiled in the age of the Kushan Empire in the first and second centuries by an order of Mahīśāsaka monastics who flourished in the Gandhāra region. It is likely that the longer Sukhāvatīvyūha owed greatly to the Lokottaravāda sect as well for its compilation, and in this sūtra there are many elements in common with the Mahāvastu.

The earliest of the Chinese translations show traces of having been translated from the Gāndhārī language, a prakrit used in the Northwest. It is also known that manuscripts in the Kharoṣṭhī script existed in China during this period.

The various versions of the sutra use various titles including Sutra of Amitāyus, Array of Amitābha (Amitābha-vyūha), and the Array of the Blissful Land (Sukhāvatīvyūha), a title it shares with the shorter Amitābha Sūtra.

In East Asian Buddhism it is most widely known as the Sutra of Immeasurable Life (simplified Chinese: 佛说无量寿经; traditional Chinese: 佛說無量壽經; pinyin: Fóshuō Wúliàngshòu Jīng; Sutra of Immeasurable Life Spoken by Buddha; Vietnamese: Phật Thuyết Vô Lượng Thọ Kinh; Japanese: Bussetsu Muryōju Kyō).

=== Versions ===
Traditionally the Longer Sukhāvatīvyūha Sūtra is believed to have been translated into Chinese twelve times from Indic language sources from 147 to 713 CE. Only five translations are extant in the Chinese Buddhist canon.

The five Chinese translations are (in order of translation date):

- Foshuo amituo sanyesanfo saloufotan guodu rendao jing (佛説阿彌陀三耶三佛薩樓佛檀過度人 道經; T. 362) - traditionally attributed to the translator Zhi Qian, but it is likely a translation of Lokakṣema (2nd century CE) or someone in his lineage. This is also called the Han translation and is likely the earliest version currently extant.
- Foshuo wuliangqingjing pingdengjue jing (佛説無量清淨平等覺經; T. 361), most likely the work of Zhi Qian (3rd-century). It is likely a revision of T.362 which introduces some verse passages. This is also called the Wu translation.
- Fóshuō Wúliángshòu Jīng (佛説無量壽經; T. 360) in two fascicles, by Buddhabhadra (359–429 ce) and his assistant Baoyun (寶雲; 376–449 ce). Traditionally it has also been attributed to Saṅghavarman at the White Horse Temple in Luoyang, though modern scholars now disagree with this. This is also called the Wei translation. This edition is the most common edition studied in East Asian Buddhism and it represents "an intermediate stage in the transmission of the larger Sukhāvatīvyūhasūtra".
- Wuliangshou rulai hui (無量壽如來會; T. 310), which is part of the composite Mahāratnakūṭasutra, which was translated by Bodhiruci II (late 6th-century and early 7th-century). This text reflects a "later recension" of the text than the previous three. It is called the "Tang translation."
- Foshuo dasheng wuliangshou zhuangyan jing (佛説大乘無量壽莊嚴經; T. 363), by Faxian (法賢; Dharmabhadra; also known as Tianxizai [天息災]; fl. 980–1000). This is often called the "Song translation" and it reflects a later recension of the Sukhāvatīvyūha.

Each of the five Chinese translations have different linguistic styles and differ slightly in content. For example, regarding the number of vows, the Han and Wu translations both have twenty-four vows and similar content, suggesting they derive from the same source text. Harrison considers these two to be archaic Chinese translations of an early Indic text of the Sukhāvatīvyūha. The Wei and Tang translations both have forty-eight vows, while the later Song translation has thirty-six vows and likely comes from a different Indic source.

Furthermore, there is a Tibetan translation, which is similar to the last two later recensions in Chinese. This is the ’Phags pa ’od dpag med kyi bkod pa (*Āryāmitābhavyūha; D 49/P 760) translated in the 9th century by Jinamitra, Dānaśīla, and Ye shes sde.

In addition to the translations, the Sūtra is also extant in Sanskrit, surviving in a late Nepalese manuscript. The Sanskrit has been directly translated into English by F. Max Mueller. It is a "late recension" type similar to the Tibetan edition.

There are also several fragments of another earlier version in Sanskrit (found in the manuscripts of the Schøyen Collection), along with fragments of Uighur, Khotanese, and Xixia translations.

According to Luis O. Gomez, there are some significant differences between the Sanskrit and the Chinese edition of Buddhabhadra / Saṅghavarman. Gomez writes:

the order of the narrative and the argument deviate, sometimes only on minor points, sometimes in major ways; differences in content occur throughout, and range from a regrouping and rearrangement of important themes (in the content and structure of the verse portions, for instance, and in the vows), to significant omissions and additions. The parallels, however, are more and stronger than the divergences, so that our understanding of one version may still benefit from our reading of the other. Two long passages in Sanghavarman's version have no correspondence in the Sanskrit (or, for that matter, in the Tibetan) versions. These passages are probably "interpolations," but we have no way of knowing for certain today where and when they were added to the text.

== Contents ==
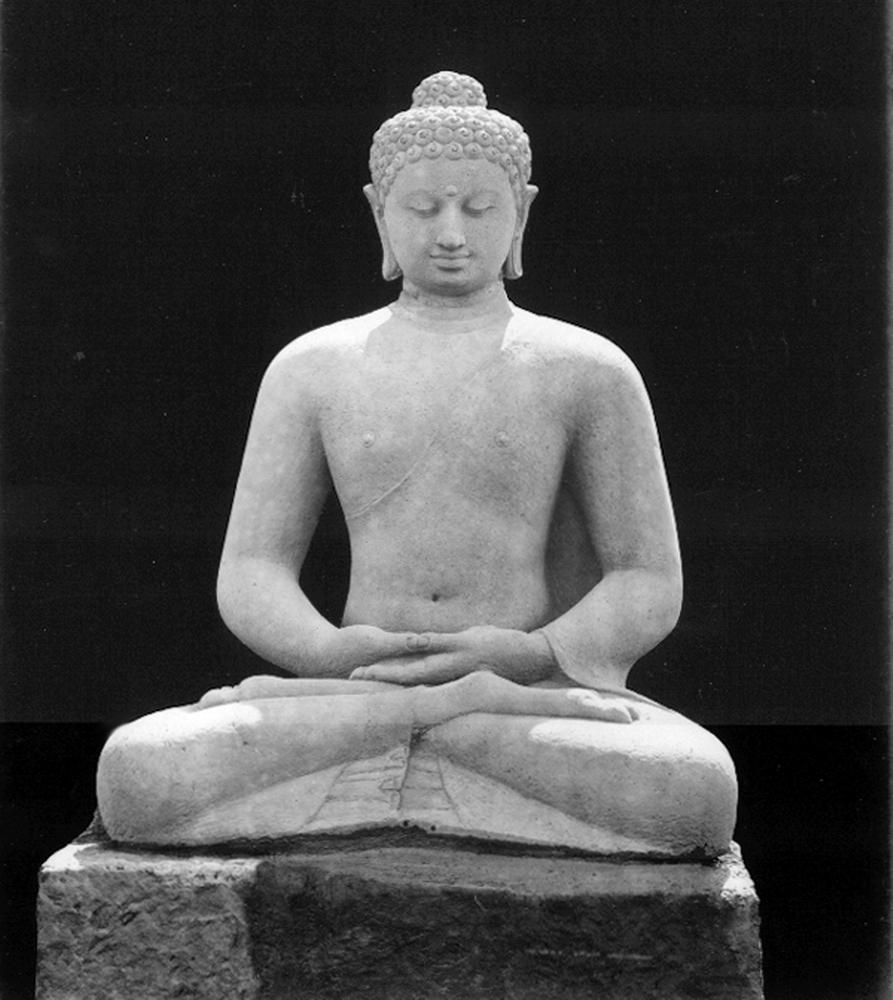
Statue of Amitābha seated in meditation. Borobudur, Java, Indonesia

The Longer Sukhāvatīvyūha Sūtra is presented as a discourse delivered by the Buddha Shakyamuni on Gṛdhrakūṭa (“Vulture Peak”) near Rājagṛha. The implicit setting is that of the Mahayana Buddhist cosmos of many world-systems, with Shakyamuni speaking in our world while also describing a distant realm. Amitabha (Measureless Light), the central figure in the sutra, is also known as Amitayus (Measureless Life). He is the Buddha of Measureless Light since his light is said to spread unimpeded over all buddha-fields. He is also the Buddha of Measureless Life, with an immeasurable life span, something that is also granted to the inhabitants of his land. Amitabha is said to have attained Buddhahood ten cosmic ages ago.

The sutra opens with the Buddha Shakyamuni begins by describing to his attendant Ānanda a past life of the Buddha Amitābha. He states that in a past life, Amitābha was once a king who renounced his kingdom and became a bodhisattva monk named Dharmākara ("Dharma Storehouse"). Under the guidance of the Buddha Lokeśvararāja ("World Sovereign King"), innumerable buddha-lands throughout the ten directions are revealed to him and he aspires to create the best of all buddha-fields, vowing:

I will have a magnificent field, the best and highest, and in this most noble beautified high seat of awakening, will be found the incomparable bliss of the state of nirvana. And I will purify this field so that in it all living beings will reach nirvana. (section 19.8; trans. Gómez, 1996, 67)

After meditating for five eons on all the qualities and features of all buddhafields, Dharmākara (i.e. Amitābha) then made a great series of bodhisattva vows to save all sentient beings, and through the great merit of his subsequent practice (which lasted many kalpas), created the realm of Sukhāvatī ("Ultimate Bliss"). This land of Sukhāvatī is "a buddha-field that is one hundred thousand million trillion buddha-fields away from where we are".

The number of vows made by Dharmākara bodhisattva differ depending on the sutra versions. Forty-eight are found in the common Chinese version, though a Sanskrit version mentions forty-seven. These vows articulate the bodhisattva's resolve to save all sentient beings and define the qualities and conditions of the buddha-field he intended to create (i.e. Sukhāvatī). The "past vows" are considered the pivotal force in Amitayus' attainment of Buddhahood and the generation of his pure buddhafield. Key vows include promises regarding:

- How Amitabha's name will be praised by all the buddhas of the ten directions
- The infinite light and life span of the Buddha Amitabha
- Rebirth in his Pure Land for those who aspire to it, even if one is only mindful of the Buddha ten times or less (this is the eighteenth vow, considered the foundational vow for Pure Land Buddhism).
- Those who hear Amitabha's name will be reborn in the Pure Land with pure golden bodies with infinite life, with the divine eye and divine ear.
- Amitabha will appear to the believer at the time of death to escort them to the Pure Land.
- Guaranteed Buddhahood for those reborn in his land. This means the immediate attainment of the bodhisattva state of non-retrogression (aivaivartika). This also means that beings reborn in this pure land are "tied to only one more birth" (ekajātipratibaddha) before buddhahood.
- Specific qualities of the land and its inhabitants, such as freedom from unpleasant experiences or ideas of property, beautiful landscapes with magical trees and animals that teach the Buddhist Dharma, and so on.

All versions of the Amitāyus Sutra contain a passage that has been seen as central to Pure Land Buddhism. In East Asia this passage is called the "18th vow" or the "Fundamental Vow" (本願, hongan). This passage promises birth in the Pure Land of Amitabha to all who merely think of Amitabha Buddha as little as ten times (excluding those who have commit the five heinous crimes and slander the True Dharma). In the Chinese translation by Buddhabhadra (T. 360) the vow states:

If, when I attain buddhahood, the sentient beings of the ten directions, with sincere mind, entrusting themselves in joy, and desiring to be born in my land, even down to ten thoughts, should not be born there, may I not attain perfect awakening. Excluded are those who commit the five heinous crimes (ānantarika karma) and slander the true Dharma.

The key passages which indicate how to attain birth in the Pure Land emphasizes hearing the Buddha's name (Sanskrit: nāmadheya), and "remembering" (anu √ smṛ) the Buddha with serene trust (prasannacitta), setting the mind on being reborn in that buddhafield (buddhakṣetre cittaṃ preṣayeyuḥ), and making the resolution (cittotpāda) to attain birth there only ten times. Since within the frame story of the sutra, it is clear that Dharmākara bodhisattva has already attain Buddhahood, becoming the Buddha Amitabha, then it is understood that whoever achieves these deeds will certainly attain birth in his pure land. In these passages, the practice of recollecting the Buddha (nianfo), even for just ten moments, is presented as a way to guarantee rebirth for all ordinary beings. A key theme of the sutra is the reliance on the spiritual power of the Buddha Amitabha, which can liberate all beings through his vast merit. In the sutra, Shakyamuni Buddha exhorts his audience to aspire to be reborn in the Land of Bliss. He states that rebirth there is achieved through generating an earnest desire, hearing and embracing Amitabha's name, and remaining mindful of it single-mindedly.

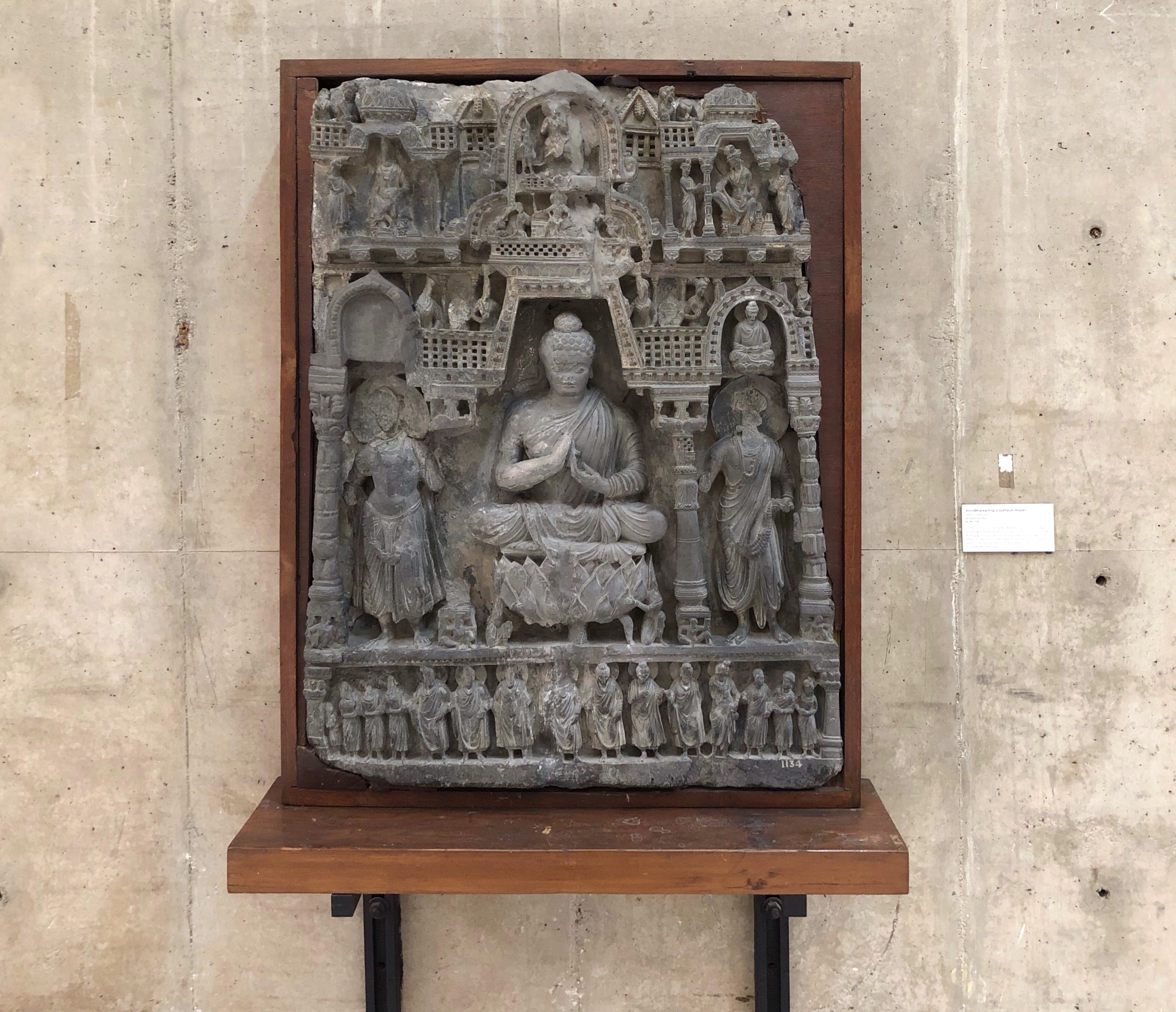
Gandharan sculpture of Amitabha in Sukhavati, 2nd century CE, from Khyber Pakhtunkhwa, Pakistan

The sutra also provides a detailed description of Amitayus' buddha-field called the "Array of Bliss" (Sukhāvatī). This buddhafield is depicted as far superior to any other world. The land is adorned with precious substances like gold, silver, emerald, and rock crystal, forming railings, rows of trees, and ponds. It features lotus ponds with clean water and golden sand. Heavenly music is constantly being played which teaches the Buddhadharma, various flower blossoms fall from the sky and there is a 9,000-kilometer-high Bodhi tree. The ground is there is of precious substances and pleasant.

Once in Sukhāvatī, beings experience only boundless happiness, never knowing evil or suffering. They have bodies of golden hue, and will possess the five supernormal abilities (abhijñās). They will lack any idea of property (parigrahasaṃjñā), even regarding their own bodies. They will spontanousely experience the joy of the third meditative absorption (dhyāna). Beings born in the Land of Bliss are said to progress irreversibly on the Buddhist path, being only one birth away from full awakening. They include a vast number of disciples (arhats) and bodhisattvas. The inhabitants of the Pure Land have other extraordinary abilities, such as being able to see and travel to other buddhafields to offer worship (pūjā) to countless buddhas throughout the cosmos.

Towards the end of the sutra, Shakyamuni explains to the bodhisattva Ajita (Maitreya) how there two main types of birth in Sukhavati:

- "those who dwell inside the closed calyxes of immense lotuses": these are beings who had doubts about rebirth in the pure land of Sukhāvatī yet had planted the necessary roots of merit and aspired to be reborn in Amitābha’s land. These beings must remain in this segregated state of purification for 500 years before they can see the Buddha and hear the Dharma from him directly.
- "those who sit cross-legged on the lotus flowers": these beings, because of their serene trust (prasanna) in the Buddha can immediately see the Buddha and enjoy all the qualities of the Pure Land right away.

Shakyamuni also recounts how numerous buddhas in all directions praise Sukhavati, confirming the truth of his message about the Land of Bliss and Amitabha.

Lastly the sutra shows the Buddha discoursing at length to the future Buddha, Maitreya, describing the various forms of evil that Maitreya must avoid to achieve his goal of becoming a buddha as well as other admonitions and advice.

== Commentaries and interpretation ==
=== Commentaries ===
There is one possible Indian commentary on the sutra, the Discourse on the Pure Land (Ch: Jìngtǔ lùn 浄土論; Sanskrit reconstruction: *Sukhāvatīvyūhopadeśa; T. 1524) attributed to Vasubandhu, and translated by Bodhiruci.

There are over twenty commentaries on the Sutra of Immeasurable Life written in China, Korea and Japan. All the commentaries are based on the Buddhabhadra / Saṅghavarman translation, which became the standard in East Asian Buddhism.

The Dilun scholar Jingying Huiyuan (c. 523–592) wrote the earliest extant Chinese commentary to the Sutra of Immeasurable Life, (this is Wu Liang Shou Jing Yi Shu 無量壽經義疏 T1745). Jizang (549–623) of the Sanlun school, also wrote another early commentary on this sutra (Wu Liang Shou Jing Yi Shu 無量壽經義疏 T1746).

There are several Korean commentaries on the sutra from the Silla era written in Chinese. Wŏnhyo (617–686) wrote two commentaries: Essentials of the Sūtra of Immeasurable Life (無量壽經宗要 T1747) in one fascicle, and Treatise on the Peaceful Bliss of Rebirth (Youxin Anledao) in one fascicle (now lost). There is also the Record of Combined Commentaries on the Sutra of Immeasurable Life (無量壽經連義述文贊, T1748) in three fascicles by the 7th century Silla monk Kyŏnghŭng. These Silla Era commentaries were influential on Japanese Pure Land Buddhism and were widely studied by figures like Ryōgen (912–985), Genshin (942–1017) and Shinran.

Japanese Pure Land traditions produced a vast and diverse body of commentaries on the Larger Sukhāvatīvyūha Sūtra. In Japan, the 12th-century Pure Land scholar Hōnen wrote four separate works that commented on the sutra. The Shin Buddhist founder Shinran also commented on the Immeasurable Life sutra in his Kyōgyōshinshō and other works, seeing it as the primary sutra of the Pure Land tradition and widely citing Kyŏnghŭng's commentary. In the 13th century, the Jōdo-shū scholar-monk Ryōe (了恵) wrote the Muryōjukyō-shō (無量壽經鈔, in 7 fascicles), a highly regarded commentary on Larger Sukhāvatīvyūha. Another early Jōdo-shū commentary on the sutra is the Critical Edition, Collation, and Commentary on the Sutra of Immeasurable Life (無量壽經見譯會校釋, in 7 fascicles) by Ryōei (良栄).

There is also a commentary anthology by the Japanese monk Dōin called Discriminating Commentary on the Sūtra of Immeasurable Life (Zhenjie). It compiles commentaries by Huiyuan, Jizang, Wŏnhyo, and Kyŏnghŭng as well as those of twenty Japanese commentators.

=== Interpretations of the vows ===
For the East Asian Buddhist tradition, the most important element in this sutra is the forty eight vows of Dharmakara bodhisattva, especially how they relate to attaining birth in the Pure Land. One early influential schema was developed by Master Huiyuan of Jingying Temple. In his Commentary on the Sutra of Immeasurable Life, he categorized the vows as follows:

- Vows related to the Dharmabody (摄法身愿): These vows concern the perfections of Amitabha's Buddhahood and are:
  - Vow 12: The Vow of Amitabha's Immeasurable Light.
  - Vow 13: The Vow of Amitabha's Immeasurable Life.
  - Vow 17: The Vow of All buddhas' Praising Amitabha
- Vows related to the Pure Land (摄净土愿): These vows concern the excellence of the Pure Land
  - Vow 31: The Vow of a Pure Land that reflects all other buddhafields.
  - Vow 32: The Vow of a Land adorned with marvels and precious substances.
- Vows related to Sentient Beings (摄众生愿): These various vows discuss how Amitābha delivers all beings from samsara into his Pure Land, and the qualities, abilities and characteristics that beings will have once born in the Pure Land. Kyŏnghŭng names them "Vows for Benefiting Beings".

This classification schema was inherited by Jizang, Kyŏnghŭng (Jingxing), Daoguang, and others writers, eventually becoming the standard categories for the Forty-eight Vows.

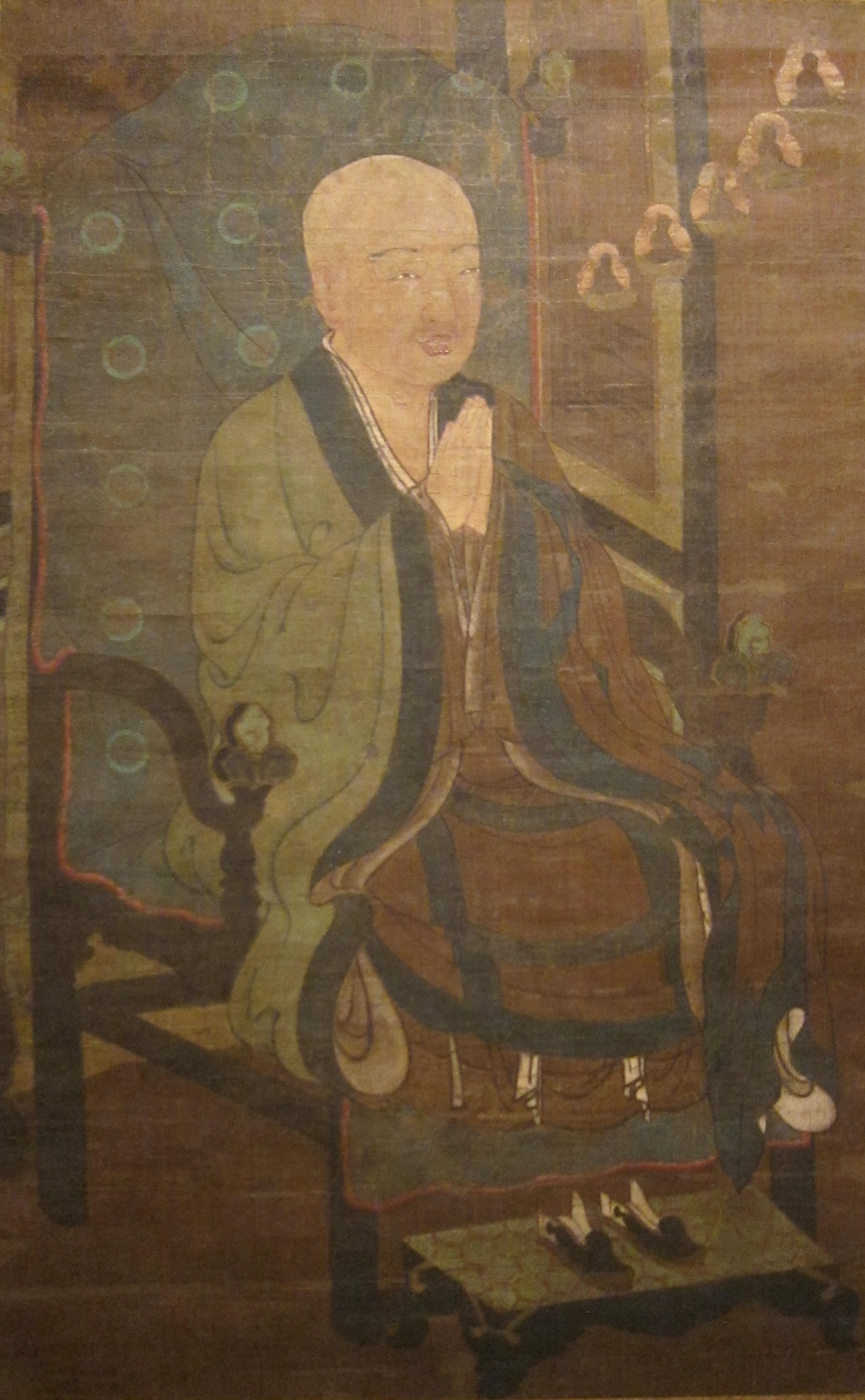
Portrait of Shandao reciting Amitabha's name, Nanbokuchō period, 14th century, Japan, hanging scroll; ink, color and gold on silk, private collection

Writing slightly afterwards, the Pure Land Master Shandao (613–681) refers to Master Huiyuan's three categories, but does not see them as truly different sets of vows. Shandao's interpretation is that every single one of the 48 vows ultimately points to, converges on and culminates in the 18th Vow. Shandao also interpreted the 18th vow as being based on reciting the Buddha's name.

According to Shandao, all other vows are grounded in and fulfill the 18th Vow, which for him, says that anyone who says Amitabha's name with faith is assured of rebirth in the Pure Land. This is known as the doctrine of "Returning to the One Vow" (一愿结归).

In his Commentary on the Contemplation Sutra, Shandao states that the essential meaning of every vow is the single vow to save all sentient beings without exception. As such, the fulfillment of the Dharma-body vows, the myriad splendors of the Pure Land (the Land vows), and the vows for sentient beings, are all encompassed by the essential meaning of the 18th vow.

According to Shandao, the essential meaning of the 18th vow and thus of all the vows is universal liberation into the Pure Land for all who say the Buddha's name. Thus, Shandao writes that all the 48 vows all say the same thing:

If I attain Buddhahood, should sentient beings in the ten directions who recite my name and wish to be born in my land, even down to ten recitations, not be born, then I shall not attain perfect awakening.

Notably, Shandao's encapsulation of the essence of the 18th vow leaves out the exclusion clause that comes at the end of the 18th vow in all editions of the sutra, which states that those who commit the five immediate transgressions and slander the True Dharma are excluded from rebirth in the Pure Land. This is because Shandao's interpretation of the meaning of this passage also relies on the Contemplation Sutra which states that even those who have committed these transgressions can be saved by saying the name of Amitabha. As such, Shandao writes that the exclusion clause is a skillful means warning beings from committing these deeds, but that it should not be taken literally, since ultimately all beings are embraced by the vow. Therefore, Shandao holds that beings who have committed the five crimes of immediate retribution and have slandered the Dharma can still be born in the Pure Land. They will still need to spend many eons enclosed inside a jeweled flower until their evil karma is purified however.

==== In Japanese Pure Land ====
The Japanese Pure Land tradition founded by Hōnen was based closely on Shandao's interpretations. As such, Hōnen's tradition focuses on the essential meaning of the 18th vow, which he termed the "Select Original Vow" (選択本願, Senchaku Hongan). In his magnum opus, the Senchaku Hongan Nembutsushū (Collection of Selections on Nenbutsu and the Original Vow), Hōnen argues that Amitābha, when he was Dharmakara bodhisattva, had "selected" the practice of buddha name recitation from among all practices of all buddha-lands as the most accessible and universal practice for all beings. Since the essential meaning of all the vows are fully condensed within the 18th Vow, the practice of reciting the Buddha's name (nenbutsu) is the fundamental method of liberation.

Shinran (1173–1262), Hōnen's disciple and founder of Jōdo Shinshū, developed this basic idea further in his Pure Land works.

Shinran distinguished Vows 18, 19, and 20 as three ways of gaining birth in the Pure Land (or three "gates"), with vow 18 as being the "True Pure Land" way, while the others referring to provisional Pure Land paths:

- The 18th Vow (The Fundamental Vow, the True Pure Land Gate): This is the supreme way, which relies purely on true faith (shinjin) in Other-power (Tariki). Sentient beings who follow this way recite the Buddha's Name with faith, abandon all self-powered effort, and rely solely on the Buddha's power to be born.
- The 19th Vow (The Vow of Welcome at Death, The Gate of Birth Through Various Practices): Those who practice relying on this vow make use of self-power practices (like performing various good deeds, meditation, etc) to accumulate merit. This merit is then dedicated toward rebirth in the Pure Land.
- The 20th Vow (The Vow of Aspiring to Be Born, the True Provisional Gate): This is the path of exclusive recitation of the Buddha's name through self power. Those who practice in this manner relate to their recitation of the nenbutsu with a mind of self-power, attempting to make themselves "worthy" of the Buddha's compassion or meritorious enough to attain birth.

== Cultural influence ==
=== Quotation on the Peace Bell at Hiroshima ===
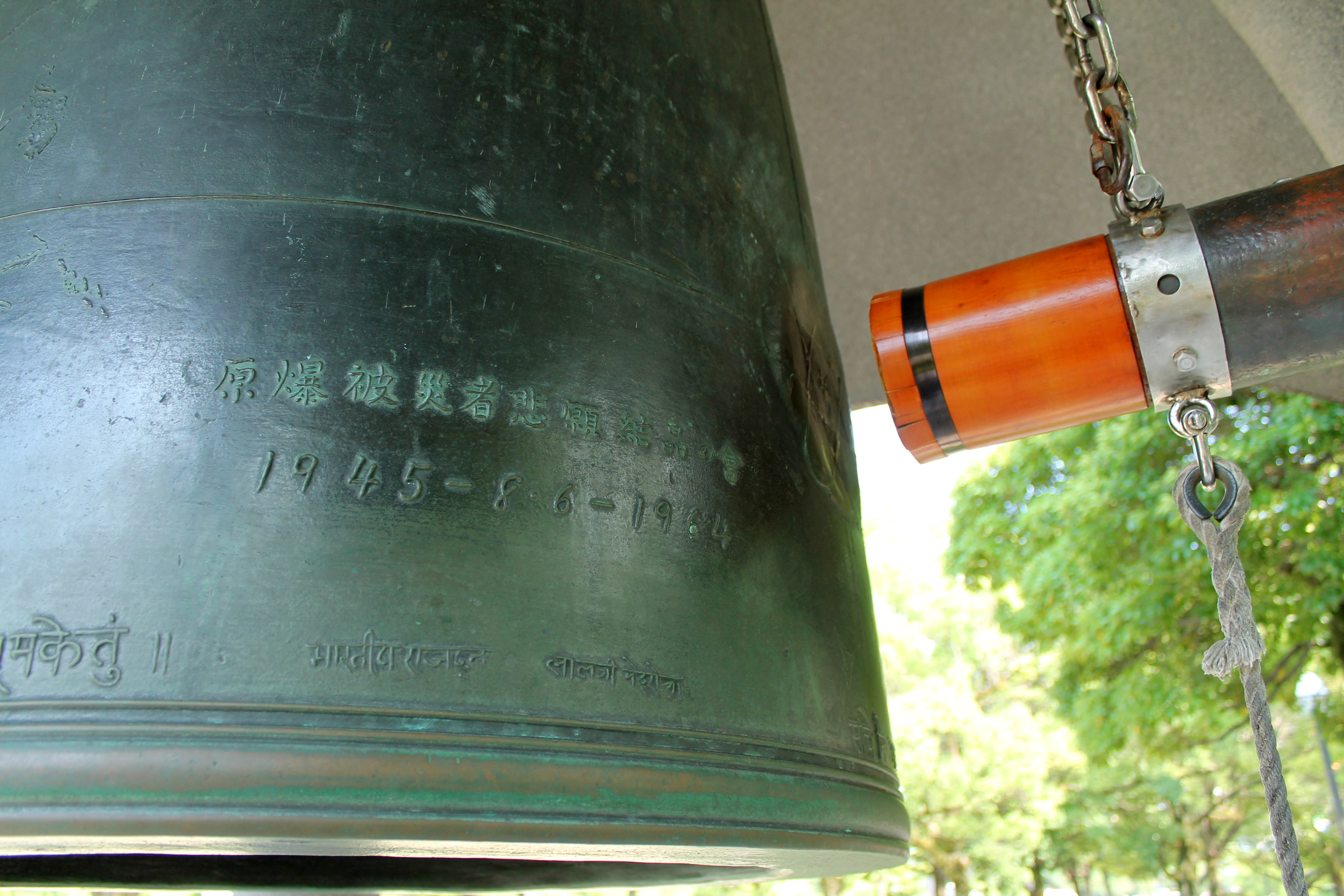
Peace Bell at Hiroshima Peace Memorial Park

A Peace Bell with an enclosure was constructed in the Hiroshima Peace Memorial Park on September 20, 1964. Among its inscriptions is a Sanskrit quote from Sukhāvatīvyūha Sūtra:

सचि मि उपगतस्य बोधिमण्डं, दश-दिशि प्रव्रजि नाम-धेयु क्षिप्रं.

saci mi upagatasya bodhi-maṇḍaṃ, daśa-diśi pravraji nāma-dheyu kṣipraṃ.

पृथु बहव अनन्त-बुद्ध-क्षेत्रां, म अहु सिया बल-प्राप्तु लोकनाथ.

ṛthu bahava ananta-buddha-kṣetrāṃ, ma ahu siyā bala-prāptu lokanātha. [2]

विपुल-प्रभ अतुल्य-नन्त नाथा, दिशि विदिशि स्फुरि सर्व-बुद्ध-क्षेत्रां,

vipula-prabhā atulya-nanta nāthā, diśi vidiśi sphuri sarvabuddha-kṣetrāṃ,

राग प्रशमि सर्व-दोष-मोहां, नरक-गतिस्मि प्रशामि धूम-केतुम्.

rāga praśāmi [praśamiya] sarva-doṣa-mohāṃ, naraka-gatismi praśāmi dhūma-ketum. [5]

The English translation (Müller, Max, trans. 1894, pp. 23–24, verses 2 and 5):

"If there should not be for me such a country, endowed with many and various mighty and divine endowments, I should gladly go to hell, suffering pain, and not be a King of treasures." [verse 2]

"The lord of vast light, incomparable and infinite, has illuminated all Buddha countries in all the quarters, he has quieted passions, all sins and errors, he has quieted the fire in the walk of hell." [verse 5]

The Chinese translation:

神力演大光

普照無際土 消除三垢冥

明濟眾厄難

== English translations ==
- Gomez, Luis, trans. (1996), The Land of Bliss: The Paradise of the Buddha of Measureless Light: Sanskrit and Chinese Versions of the Sukhavativyuha Sutras, Honolulu: University of Hawaii Press
- Inagaki, Hisao, trans. (2003), The Three Pure Land Sutras (PDF), Berkeley: Numata Center for Buddhist Translation and Research, ISBN 1-886439-18-4, archived from the original (PDF) on May 12, 2014
- Müller, Max, trans. (1894), The Larger Sukhāvatī-vyūha. In: The Sacred Books of the East, Volume XLIX: Buddhist Mahāyāna Texts, Part II. Oxford: Clarendon Press, ISBN 1-60206-381-8

== See also ==
- Shorter Sukhāvatīvyūha Sūtra (Amitabha Sutra)
- Sukhavati
- Amitābha
- Mahayana sutras

== Bibliography ==
- Nattier, Jan (2003). The Indian Roots of Pure Land Buddhism: Insights from the Oldest Chinese Versions of the Larger Sukhavativyuha, Pacific World (3rd series) 5, 179–201
