= Discourse on the Pure Land =

The Discourse on the Pure Land (Ch: Jìngtǔ lùn 浄土論, Jp: Jōdō ron; Sanskrit reconstruction: *Sukhāvatīvyūhopadeśa; T. 1524) is an Indic Buddhist treatise on Pure Land Buddhist practice attributed to Vasubandhu. The full title of the work in Chinese translates to Verses of Aspiration: An Upadeśa on the Amitāyus Sūtra (Ch: Wúliángshòujīng yōupótíshè yuànshēng jié 無量壽經優婆提舍願生偈, T.1524).

The Jìngtǔ lùn is said to have been translated into Chinese by the Indian monk Bodhiruci (6th century CE). It is one of the most important scriptures in Pure Land Buddhism alongside the three Pure Land sutras.

The Discourse on the Pure Land is also the basis for an influential commentary by the Pure Land patriarch Tanluan, the Jingtu lun zhu (浄土論註; T. 1819).

== Overview ==
Vasubandhu's Discourse on the Pure Land) serves as a comprehensive commentary on the Sutra of Infinite Life, elucidating the virtues of Amitābha Buddha's Pure Land (Sukhāvatī) and the means by which beings can be reborn there. The text consists of a Gāthā (a verse of aspiration) and an Exposition that systematically explains its meaning. Vasubandhu emphasizes that by contemplating Sukhāvatī, one can generate faith in Amitābha and aspire to be reborn in his land of supreme bliss.

=== The Gāthā ===
The Gāthā (Verses) opens with Vasubandhu taking refuge in Amitābha Buddha, whose "unhindered Light exhaustively fills the ten quarters" and expressing his aspiration to be born in the "Land of Peace and Bliss" (Sukhāvatī). He describes this world as transcending the limitations of the three realms (triloka) and likens it to "empty space, vast and boundless."

The Gāthā elaborates on the unparalleled virtues of Sukhāvatī. It explains how it arises from the "Great Compassion of the Right Path" and is adorned with a purity akin to a mirror or the sun. The land is composed of rare jewels, with "innumerable nets of jewels" covering the sky. Soft, jewel-like grasses sway with pleasure-giving movement, surpassing earthly delights. Furthermore, in that land, radiant, undefiled Light illuminates all over, and the sound of ringing jeweled bells proclaims the Dharma. The inhabitants of Sukhāvatī are free from suffering and experience "happiness without cease." They take meditation (dhyāna) and concentration (samādhi) as their nourishment. The pure land is said to be a place of equality, devoid of slander, impurity, or suffering.

=== The Exposition ===
That land of the Buddha of Immeasurable Life (Amitābha) is adorned with the supreme truth (paramārtha-satya) and wondrous characteristics. - Jìngtǔ lùn

The prose section explains the practices to attain birth in the pure land and then elaborates on the qualities of this pure realm by categorizing its features into twenty-nine adornments. These are further divided into three groups: seventeen attributes of the Pure Land itself, eight pertaining to Amitābha Buddha, and four associated with the bodhisattvas who reside there.

==== Five Gates of Mindfulness ====
The Exposition focuses on the means to attain rebirth in Sukhāvatī. Vasubandhu states that by contemplating Amitābha Buddha's Land of Peace and Bliss, a practitioner following the bodhisattva path will perceive the Buddha and attain rebirth in that realm. He further explains that through the cultivation of the five gates of mindfulness (五念門), the practitioner develops and realizes a singularly pure faith.

These Five Gates of Buddha Mindfulness serve as essential practices through which followers of the Pure Land path may achieve birth in Amitābha's land. Each gate is also linked with a specific type of virtue. These gates and virtues are as follows:

1. Worship (礼拝, pūjā): Physically bowing to and venerating Amitābha Buddha with the sincere aspiration to be born in Sukhāvatī. Perfecting this gate leads to the virtue of the gate of approach (近門), which is gaining birth into the pure land.
2. Praise (讃嘆, stuti): Reciting Amitābha's Names, which embody his wisdom and the path to unity with reality. Perfecting this gate leads into "inclusion within the multitudes of the great assembly" (大会衆門).
3. Aspiration (作願, praṇidhāna): Wholeheartedly and single-mindedly wishing for birth in Sukhāvatī. Perfecting this leads to the gate of the house (宅門) i.e. the attainment of samādhi.
4. Contemplation (観察, dhyāna / vipaśyanā): Meditating on the virtues of Sukhāvatī, Amitābha Buddha, and the Bodhisattvas present there. Perfection of this leads to the gate of the room (室門), the attainment of insight.
5. Merit-Transference (回向, pariṇāmanā): Dedicating all accumulated merits to the benefit of all beings, thereby cultivating great compassion. Perfecting this leads to the virtue of departure (出功徳), also called the gate of playing in the garden and forest (園林遊戯地門), whereby bodhisattvas manifest in saṃsāra to guide beings to the pure land.

The first three gates correspond to the practitioner's three modes of karmic activity: worshiping Amitābha Buddha with the body, praising the Buddha's name verbally, and generating the single minded aspiration for birth in the Pure Land. These are to be done with a still and calm mind (śamatha 奢摩他).

In the fourth gate, the practitioner meditates upon the adornments of the Pure Land, gaining insight into their true nature (which Vasubandhu describes as vipaśyanā 毗婆舎那). These adornments are not mundane physical objects, instead they are manifestations of dharma-nature itself. Vasubandhu characterizes this dharma as the virtue of purity, encapsulated in the concept of the "One Dharma Phrase" (一法句). More precisely, the adornments of the Buddha Land, Amitābha Buddha, and the bodhisattvas embody the perfections of the Buddha's vow and right practices. These adornments express the virtues of both self-benefit and benefiting others, thereby signifying purity.

Vasubandhu then explains how, through perfecting śamatha and vipaśyanā, one can attain the perfection of the fifth gate of merit transference. By engaging in the practices associated with the five gates, the practitioner accumulates good roots of merit. Rather than seeking personal pleasure, they aspire to relieve the suffering of all beings and wish for their collective birth in the Pure Land. Through the completion of the practice of merit transference, the practitioner renounces three obstacles that hinder the path to enlightenment, while simultaneously cultivating three qualities that align with it.

These are called the three pure minds. They are:

- one relinquishes self-centered attachment and ceases to look for personal happiness. Vasubandhu describes this as the undefiled pure mind (無染清浄心), which represents the perfection of the mind of wisdom.
- one abandons the tendency to withhold peace from others, instead striving to eliminate the suffering of all beings. This is the peaceful pure mind (安清浄心) and corresponds to the perfection of the mind of compassion.
- one renounces self-praise and self-veneration, choosing instead to extend compassion toward all beings. Vasubandhu refers to this as the blissful pure mind (楽清浄心), which aligns with the perfection of the mind of skillful means, enabling one to benefit others without obstruction.

Vasubandhu goes on to state that these three pure minds are all condensed into the one exquisite, blissful, superior, and true mind (妙 楽勝真心). In other words, the three fulfilled minds of wisdom, compassion, and expediency all comprise the single mind of prajñā.

The Discourse concludes with the following statement:

The bodhisattva, by entering the four types of gates, perfects the self-benefiting practices. This you should know. The bodhisattva, by departing through the fifth gate, perfects the practices of benefiting others through the transference of merits. This you should know. The bodhisattva, in this way performing the practices of the five gates, will accomplish self-benefit and benefiting-others and quickly obtain the perfection of the highest, perfect enlightenment.

==== Adornments of the Pure Land ====
Vasubandhu now moves on to explain the adornments of the pure land and then after the qualities of its inhabitants. First, he explains:

The adornments of the Land of the Buddha of Eternal Life are the embodiments of that wondrous World of the Highest Truth.

Vasubandhu further explains the attributes of Sukhāvatī into seventeen adornments, corresponding to specific lines of the Gāthā. The ornaments of the pure land include: Purity, Immeasurability, Marvelous Colors, pleasurable tactile objects (such as the grasses), adornments raining down from the sky (like flowers etc.), light that fills the land, wondrous voice that fills the land teaching Dharma, Amitābha Buddha and the bodhisattvas, etc. These seventeen adornments (alamkara) collectively illustrate the perfection of Sukhāvatī and serve as objects of contemplation for practitioners. Vasubandhu also emphasizes how the pure land has no gender (specifically, he mentions how there no women in the pure land), how there are no imperfect bodies, and how beings with the seeds of the sravakayana are not born there.

According to Vasubandhu, the seventeen adornments of the Buddha's Pure Land correspond to the "Purity of the World-as-Vessel" (器世間清浄), while the eight adornments of Amitābha Buddha and the four adornments of the bodhisattvas represent the "Purity of the World of Sentient Beings" (衆生世間清浄). Vasubandhu asserts that these two forms of purity are integrated within the One Dharma Phrase (入一法句), which is really "the unconditioned dharma-body of true and real wisdom" (真実智慧無為法身). In other words, this One Dharma Phrase, which he also calls "the principle of purity" (清浄句), corresponds to the Dharmakāya, which compassionately manifests the Land, the Buddha, and the bodhisattvas for the purpose of delivering all sentient beings to full Buddhahood via the pure land Dharma gate.

==== The Perfections of Amitābha Buddha and the bodhisattvas ====
The text details eight aspects of Amitābha Buddha’s perfections, including Amitābha's delicate flower seat pedestal, how Amitābha's light extends for fathoms, how his voice is heard throughout the land and how his mind is without any mental discrimination. These perfections affirm that seeing Amitābha Buddha leads to the attainment of the Dharma Body of Equality and ultimate tranquility.

Thus Vasubandhu writes:

“In contemplating the power of the Buddha’s primal vow, I realize that no one who encounters it will pass by in vain. It enables one to quickly attain the great treasure-ocean of virtues.” That is to say, upon seeing that Buddha, the bodhisattva who has not yet realized the pure mind will ultimately attain the realization of the dharma-body of equality.

The perfections of the bodhisattvas in the Pure Land are described in four aspects:

1. They can manifest transformed bodies throughout the ten quarters without actually leaving the pure land (不動而至)
2. They may radiate great light to illuminate and teach sentient beings throughout the ten quarters in an instant (一念遍至)
3. They make offerings to and praise all Buddhas in all Buddha lands of the ten directions (供養讃歎)
4. They sustain the Three Jewels in worlds where they are absent (三宝住持).

Vasubandhu also discusses the bodhisattvas' dedication of merit to all beings. According to Vasubandhu, bodhisattvas transfer their merit out compassion, without seeking personal glory, since they aspire for all beings to be born in the pure land.

Vasubandhu praises these adornments as the manifestations of the virtues perfected through Amitābha Buddha's primal vow to establish a Pure Land where all sentient beings may attain rebirth.

== See also ==
- Longer Sukhāvatīvyūha Sūtra (Infinite Life Sutra)
- Shorter Sukhāvatīvyūha Sūtra (Amitābha Sutra)
- Abhidharmakośabhāṣya
- Tanluan
