= Bodhiruci =

Indian Buddhist monk

Bodhiruci (Chinese: 菩提流支; pinyin: pú tí liú zhī) was a Buddhist monk from North India (6th century CE) active in the area of Luoyang, China. He was appointed as master translator at Yongning (永寧寺) temple by emperor Xuanwu of the Northern Wei. In his translations, Bodhiruci was assisted by the central Indian monk Ratnamati (勒那摩提).

Bodhiruci translated various important texts including the Ten Stages Sutra (Chinese: 十地経論) and the commentary on this sutra by Vasubandhu (Shidi jing lun 十地經論). He translated the Sukhāvatīvyūha Sūtra as well as Vasubandhu's commentary titled Stanzas of the vow to be reborn [in the Pure Land] in the Sūtra [of the Buddha] Infinite Life (Wuliangshou jing youbotishe yuansheng jie 無量壽經優波提 舍願生偈). He also translated Sūtra of the descent to Laṅka (Ru lengqie jing 入楞伽經), and a Sūtra of Buddha names (Foming jing 佛名經).

By the time of his death Bodhiruci had translated between 20 and 30 texts.

Bodhiruci is regarded as the patriarch of the Dashabhumika (Chinese: 地論宗; pinyin: Dìlùn zōng) school, which used his Ten Stages Sutra and Vasubandhu's commentary as its chief object of study.

Bodhiruci's disciple, Daochong (道寵), founded of the northern Dilun branch which focused on the practice of reciting the names of the Buddhas. Bodhiruci was also the master of Tanluan (曇鸞), one of the patriarchs of the Pure Land tradition.

== Translations ==
Numerous translations are attributed to Bodhiruci by the Chinese Buddhist catalogues. They include the following:

=== Sūtras ===
- Vajracchedikā Prajñāpāramitā Sūtra (金剛般若波羅蜜經) (T 236a).
- Sūtra of the Teaching of the Great Satyanirgranthaputra (大薩遮尼乾子所說經; Sanskrit: Bodhisattvagocarôpāyaviṣayavikurvāṇanirdeśa, also known as Mahāsatyanirgranthaputra vyākaraṇa Sūtra) (T 272).
- Saṃdhinirmocana Sūtra (Sūtra of the Unraveling of the Deep Secret, 深密解脫經) (T 675).
- Laṅkāvatāra Sūtra (入楞伽經) (T 671).
- Anūnatvāpūrṇatvanirdeśa Sūtra (Sūtra on the Teaching of Neither Increase nor Decrease, 不增不減經) (T 668).
- Buddha-name Sūtra (佛名經 Buddhanāmasūtra) (T 440).
- Gayāśīrṣa Sūtra (Sūtra of the Gayāśīrṣa Hill, 伽耶山頂經) (T 465).
- Mañjuśrīvihāra Sūtra (Sūtra of Mañjuśrī’s Sojourn/Practice, 文殊師利巡行經) (T 470).
- Kṣemavatīvyākaraṇa Sūtra (Sūtra of the Prophecy of Kṣemavatī, 差摩婆帝授記經) (T 573).
- Bhavasaṃkrānti Sūtra (Sūtra of the Transmigration of Existence / Great Vaipulya Sūtra King, 大方等修多羅王經) (T 575).
- Viśeṣacintabrahmaparipṛcchā Sūtra (Sūtra of the Questions of Brahmā with Superior Thought) (T 587).
- Dharmasaṃgīti Sūtra (Sūtra of the Collection of Dharma, 法集經) (T 761).
- Anakṣarakaraṇḍaka Sūtra (Sūtra of the Letterless Casket, 無字寶篋經) (T 828).
- Sūtra on Reviling the Buddha – Chinese: 謗佛經 (T 831).
- Buddha-vacana Sūtra (Sūtra of the Buddha’s Words, 佛語經) (T 832).
- Dhāraṇī Sūtra for Protecting All Children (護諸童子陀羅尼經) (T 1028A).

=== Treatises and Commentaries ===
- Vasubandhu's Discourse on the Pure Land — Jìngtǔ lùn (浄土論) also called 無量壽經優波提舍; (Sukhāvativyūhôpadeśa) (T 1524).
- Vasubandhu's Treatise on the Ten Stages Sutra (Daśabhūmikasūtra-śāstra, 十地經論) (T 1522).
- Upadeśa on the Saddharmapuṇḍarīka (妙法蓮華經憂波提舍, Saddharmapuṇḍarīkôpadeśa) (T 1519).
- Treatise on the Vajracchedikā Prajñāpāramitā Sūtra (金剛般若波羅蜜經論) (T 1511).
- Treatise on the Great Jewel Heap Sūtra (大寶積經論, Ratnakūṭa Sūtra Śāstra (T 1523).
- Upadeśa on the Questions of Maitreya Bodhisattva (彌勒菩薩所問經論, Maitreyaparipṛcchôpadeśa) (T 1525).
- Commentary on the Gayāśīrṣa Sūtra (文殊師利菩薩問菩提經論, Gayāśīrṣasūtra Ṭīkā) (T 1531).
- Treatise on the Viśeṣacintabrahmaparipṛcchā Sūtra (勝思惟梵天所問經論) (T 1532).
- Akṣaraśataka Vṛtti (Treatise on One Hundred Syllables / Commentary on the Hundred Letters) – Chinese: 百字論; Sanskrit: Akṣaraśataka[vṛtti] (T 1572).
- Āryadeva’s Treatise on Refuting the Four Tenets of Tīrthikas and Hīnayānists Found in the Laṅkāvatāra Sūtra (提婆菩薩破楞伽經中外道小乘四宗論) (T 1639).
- Āryadeva’s Treatise on Explaining the Nirvāṇa of Tīrthikas and Hīnayānists Found in the Laṅkāvatāra Sūtra – (提婆菩薩釋楞伽經中外道小乘涅槃論) (T 1640).
- Pratītyasamutpāda Śāstra (Treatise on the Twelve Links of Dependent Origination, 十二因緣論) (T 1651).
- Vajra-sage Treatise (Jin’gangxian Lun, 金剛仙論) – now regarded as likely a Chinese apocryphon (T 1512).
