= West Hill =

West Hill may refer to:

== Canada ==
- West Hill, Toronto, a neighbourhood in the east of the city

== England ==
- West Hill, Brighton, East Sussex
- West Hill, Devon
- West Hill, Dorset
- West Hill, East Riding of Yorkshire, a location
- West Hill, Hastings, a location
- West Hill, Highgate
- West Hill, London
  - West Hill (ward)
- West Hill, Kirknewton, Northumberland
- West Hill, North Somerset, a location in Somerset
- West Hill, South Somerset, a location in Somerset
- West Hill, Staffordshire, a location
- West Hill, West Sussex, a location
- West Hill, Wiltshire
- West Hill School, Stalybridge, Greater Manchester

== India ==
- West Hill railway station, Kozhikode District, Kerala

== Scotland ==
- Craig Leith (hill), also known as West Hill, in the Ochil Hills

== United States ==
- West Hill Historic District (West Hartford, Connecticut), listed on the NRHP in Connecticut
- West Hill (Lumpkin, Georgia), listed on the NRHP in Georgia
- West Hill Historic District (Muscatine, Iowa), listed on the NRHP in Iowa
- West Hill (Hamilton County, New York), a summit
- West Hill, Ohio
- West Hill, Pennsylvania

== See also ==
- Westhill (disambiguation)
- West Hill Historic District (disambiguation)
- West Hills (disambiguation)
