= Western Hills (disambiguation) =

Western Hills is a mountainous region of China.

Western Hills may also refer to:

- Western Hills, Cincinnati, a neighborhood
  - Western Hills Airport, former airport near Cincinnati
- Western Hills Group, a faction of the Chinese Nationalist Party, or KMT
- Xishan Society, or Western Hills Society, a faction of the Chinese Communist Party
- Western Hills Mall, a shopping mall in metro Birmingham, Alabama

== See also ==
- Western Hills High School (disambiguation)
- Western Hill, St. Catharines, Ontario, Canada
- West Hills (disambiguation)
- 西山
