= Westhill =

Westhill may refer to:

== Places ==
- Westhill, Aberdeenshire, a small town approximately 7.5 miles due west of the city of Aberdeen in Scotland
- Westhill, Highland, a community area approximately 4 miles to the east of Inverness in the Scottish Highlands, and 2.5 miles west of Culloden
- Westhill (Austin, Texas), listed on the National Register of Historic Places in Travis County, Texas

== Schools ==
- Westhill High School (Connecticut) in Stamford, Connecticut
- Westhill Senior High School in Syracuse, New York
- West Hill School - Stalybridge in Stalybridge, NW, UK
- Westhill Institute in Mexico City

== Other ==
- Devon Westhill, American attorney
- West Hill railway station, Kerala, India

== See also ==
- West Hill (disambiguation)
