= List of United Kingdom locations: Weste-West L =

The United Kingdom

This is part of the list of United Kingdom locations: a gazetteer of place names in the United Kingdom showing each place's locality and geographical coordinates.

== West (continued) ==
=== Weste ===
Location	Locality	Coordinates (links to map & photo sources)	OS grid reference
Westenhanger	Kent	51.09°N 01.02°E	TR1237
Wester Aberchalder	Highland	57.23°N 04.40°W	NH5519
Wester Arboll	Highland	57.80°N 03.90°W	NH8781
Wester Auchinloch	North Lanarkshire	55.90°N 04.16°W	NS6570
Wester Balgedie	Perth and Kinross	56.22°N 03.35°W	NO1604
Wester Broomhouse	East Lothian	55.97°N 02.53°W	NT6776
Westerdale	Highland	58.43°N 03.50°W	ND1251
Westerdale	North Yorkshire	54.43°N 00.98°W	NZ6605
Wester Dechmont	West Lothian	55.91°N 03.56°W	NT0270
Wester Deloraine	Scottish Borders	55.46°N 03.06°W	NT3320
Wester Eggie	Angus	56.81°N 03.06°W	NO3570
Wester Essendy	Perth and Kinross	56.57°N 03.41°W	NO1343
Wester Essenside	Scottish Borders	55.47°N 02.88°W	NT4420
Westerfield	Suffolk	52.07°N 01.16°E	TM1747
Westerfield	Shetland Islands	60.24°N 01.36°W	HU3551
Wester Foffarty	Angus	56.59°N 02.96°W	NO4145
Westergate	West Sussex	50.83°N 00.68°W	SU9305
Wester Gruinards	Highland	57.89°N 04.51°W	NH5192
Wester Hailes	City of Edinburgh	55.90°N 03.28°W	NT2069
Westerham	Kent	51.26°N 00.06°E	TQ4454
Westerhope	Newcastle upon Tyne	54.99°N 01.70°W	NZ1967
Wester Housebyres	Scottish Borders	55.61°N 02.74°W	NT5336
Wester Kershope	Scottish Borders	55.52°N 03.01°W	NT3626
Westerleigh	South Gloucestershire	51.50°N 02.44°W	ST6979
Westerleigh Hill	South Gloucestershire	51.50°N 02.43°W	ST7079
Wester Meathie	Angus	56.60°N 02.89°W	NO4546
Western Bank	Cumbria	54.82°N 03.18°W	NY2448
Western Downs	Staffordshire	52.78°N 02.14°W	SJ9021
Western Heights	Kent	51.11°N 01.29°E	TR3140
Western Hill	Durham	54.77°N 01.59°W	NZ2642
Western Park	City of Leicester	52.63°N 01.17°W	SK5604
Wester Parkgate	Dumfries and Galloway	55.17°N 03.54°W	NY0288
Wester Quarff	Shetland Islands	60.09°N 01.28°W	HU4035
Wester Skeld	Shetland Islands	60.17°N 01.47°W	HU2943
Westerton	West Sussex	50.85°N 00.75°W	SU8807
Westerton	Durham	54.67°N 01.64°W	NZ2331
Westerton of Runavey	Perth and Kinross	56.80°N 03.44°W	NO1269
Westerwick	Shetland Islands	60.16°N 01.49°W	HU2842
West Ewell	Surrey	51.35°N 00.27°W	TQ2063
West Farleigh	Kent	51.24°N 00.44°E	TQ7152
West Farndon	Northamptonshire	52.15°N 01.24°W	SP5251
West Felton	Shropshire	52.81°N 02.98°W	SJ3425
West Ferry	City of Dundee	56.46°N 02.91°W	NO4431

=== Westf ===
Location	Locality	Coordinates (links to map & photo sources)	OS grid reference
Westfield	Hampshire	50.78°N 00.99°W	SZ7199
Westfield	East Sussex	50.90°N 00.57°E	TQ8115
Westfield	Herefordshire	52.12°N 02.41°W	SO7247
Westfield	Highland	58.55°N 03.63°W	ND0564
Westfield	Bath and North East Somerset	51.28°N 02.47°W	ST6754
Westfield	Surrey	51.29°N 00.56°W	TQ0056
Westfield	Redcar and Cleveland	54.60°N 01.08°W	NZ5924
Westfield	Cumbria	54.62°N 03.56°W	NX9927
Westfield	Bradford	53.85°N 01.71°W	SE1940
Westfield	Kirklees	53.71°N 01.68°W	SE2124
West Field	York	53.94°N 01.14°W	SE5650
Westfield	Sheffield	53.32°N 01.35°W	SK4381
West Field	North Lincolnshire	53.65°N 00.30°W	TA1219
Westfield	Norfolk	52.64°N 00.94°E	TF9909
Westfield	Angus	56.63°N 02.91°W	NO4449
Westfield	West Lothian	55.92°N 03.71°W	NS9372
Westfield	North Lanarkshire	55.93°N 04.05°W	NS7273
Westfields	Dorset	50.85°N 02.39°W	ST7206
Westfields	Herefordshire	52.07°N 02.74°W	SO4942
West Fields	Berkshire	51.39°N 01.34°W	SU4666
Westfields of Rattray	Perth and Kinross	56.59°N 03.33°W	NO1846
Westfield Sole	Kent	51.32°N 00.53°E	TQ7761
West Firle	East Sussex	50.84°N 00.08°E	TQ4707
West Fleetham	Northumberland	55.54°N 01.70°W	NU1928
West Flodden	Northumberland	55.60°N 02.14°W	NT9134
Westford	Somerset	50.97°N 03.25°W	ST1220
Westford	Highland	57.69°N 04.28°W	NH6469

=== West G ===
Location	Locality	Coordinates (links to map & photo sources)	OS grid reference
West Garforth	Leeds	53.78°N 01.40°W	SE3932
Westgate	Durham	54.73°N 02.15°W	NY9038
Westgate	North Lincolnshire	53.55°N 00.83°W	SE7707
Westgate	Norfolk	52.92°N 00.92°E	TF9740
Westgate Hill	Kirklees	53.75°N 01.69°W	SE2029
Westgate-on-Sea	Kent	51.38°N 01.33°E	TR3270
Westgate Street	Norfolk	52.74°N 01.24°E	TG1921
West Ginge	Oxfordshire	51.57°N 01.36°W	SU4486
West Gorton	Manchester	53.46°N 02.21°W	SJ8696
West Grafton	Wiltshire	51.33°N 01.65°W	SU2460
West Green	West Sussex	51.11°N 00.20°W	TQ2637
West Green	Haringey	51.58°N 00.09°W	TQ3289
West Green	Hampshire	51.29°N 00.93°W	SU7456
West Green	Barnsley	53.56°N 01.44°W	SE3708
West Grimstead	Wiltshire	51.03°N 01.70°W	SU2126
West Grinstead	West Sussex	50.96°N 00.33°W	TQ1720

=== West H ===
Location	Locality	Coordinates (links to map & photo sources)	OS grid reference
West Haddlesey	North Yorkshire	53.72°N 01.15°W	SE5626
West Haddon	Northamptonshire	52.33°N 01.07°W	SP6371
West Hagbourne	Oxfordshire	51.57°N 01.26°W	SU5187
West Hagley	Worcestershire	52.41°N 02.14°W	SO9080
Westhall	Suffolk	52.37°N 01.53°E	TM4181
West Hallam	Derbyshire	52.96°N 01.36°W	SK4341
Westhall Hill	Oxfordshire	51.80°N 01.62°W	SP2612
West Halton	North Lincolnshire	53.66°N 00.63°W	SE9020
Westham	Somerset	51.21°N 02.86°W	ST4046
Westham	East Sussex	50.81°N 00.31°E	TQ6304
Westham	Dorset	50.60°N 02.48°W	SY6679
West Ham	Newham	51.52°N 00.01°E	TQ4083
West Ham	Hampshire	51.26°N 01.12°W	SU6152
Westhampnett	West Sussex	50.84°N 00.75°W	SU8806
West Hampstead	Camden	51.55°N 00.19°W	TQ2585
West Handley	Derbyshire	53.28°N 01.41°W	SK3977
West Hanney	Oxfordshire	51.62°N 01.42°W	SU4092
West Hanningfield	Essex	51.66°N 00.50°E	TQ7399
West Hardwick	Wakefield	53.65°N 01.38°W	SE4118
West Harlsey	North Yorkshire	54.37°N 01.37°W	SE4198
West Harptree	Bath and North East Somerset	51.30°N 02.63°W	ST5656
West Harrow	Harrow	51.57°N 00.35°W	TQ1487
West Harting	West Sussex	50.98°N 00.89°W	SU7821
West Harton	South Tyneside	54.96°N 01.43°W	NZ3664
West Hatch	Somerset	50.98°N 03.02°W	ST2821
West Hatch	Wiltshire	51.04°N 02.11°W	ST9227
Westhay	Somerset	51.17°N 02.81°W	ST4342
Westhead	Lancashire	53.55°N 02.86°W	SD4307
West Head	Norfolk	52.62°N 00.31°E	TF5705
West Heath	Bexley	51.47°N 00.11°E	TQ4777
West Heath	Birmingham	52.39°N 01.97°W	SP0277
West Heath	Cheshire	53.16°N 02.24°W	SJ8463
West Heath (Wootton St Lawrence)	Hampshire	51.31°N 01.15°W	SU5958
West Heath (Farnborough)	Hampshire	51.29°N 00.78°W	SU8556
West Helmsdale	Highland	58.11°N 03.68°W	ND0115
West Hendon	Brent	51.57°N 00.25°W	TQ2188
West Hendred	Oxfordshire	51.58°N 01.36°W	SU4488
West Heogaland	Shetland Islands	60.48°N 01.60°W	HU2278
West Herrington	Sunderland	54.87°N 01.47°W	NZ3453
West Heslerton	North Yorkshire	54.16°N 00.60°W	SE9175
West Hewish	North Somerset	51.37°N 02.87°W	ST3964
Westhide	Herefordshire	52.09°N 02.61°W	SO5844
West Hill	Devon	50.73°N 03.33°W	SY0694
West Hill	East Riding of Yorkshire	54.07°N 00.22°W	TA1666
Westhill	East Riding of Yorkshire	53.83°N 00.14°W	TA2239
West Hill	East Sussex	50.86°N 00.58°E	TQ8210
West Hill	North Somerset	51.48°N 02.79°W	ST4576
West Hill	Somerset	51.05°N 02.42°W	ST7028
West Hill	Staffordshire	52.70°N 02.01°W	SJ9912
West Hill	Wandsworth	51.45°N 00.21°W	TQ2474
West Hill	West Sussex	51.05°N 00.11°W	TQ3230
West Hill	Wiltshire	51.39°N 02.18°W	ST8766
Westhill	Aberdeenshire	57.14°N 02.29°W	NJ8206
Westhill	Highland	57.46°N 04.15°W	NH7144
West Hills	Angus	56.58°N 02.76°W	NO5344
West Hoathly	West Sussex	51.07°N 00.06°W	TQ3632
West Holme	Dorset	50.66°N 02.17°W	SY8885
West Holywell	North Tyneside	55.04°N 01.53°W	NZ3072
Westhope	Shropshire	52.46°N 02.78°W	SO4786
Westhope	Herefordshire	52.15°N 02.79°W	SO4651
West Horndon	Essex	51.56°N 00.33°E	TQ6288
Westhorp	Northamptonshire	52.17°N 01.25°W	SP5153
Westhorpe	Suffolk	52.28°N 00.98°E	TM0469
Westhorpe	Nottinghamshire	53.06°N 00.98°W	SK6852
Westhorpe	Lincolnshire	52.86°N 00.18°W	TF2231
West Horrington	Somerset	51.22°N 02.61°W	ST5747
West Horsley	Surrey	51.25°N 00.46°W	TQ0752
West Horton	Northumberland	55.56°N 01.96°W	NU0230
West Hougham	Kent	51.11°N 01.22°E	TR2640
Westhoughton	Bolton	53.54°N 02.52°W	SD6505
West Houlland	Shetland Islands	60.23°N 01.51°W	HU2750
Westhouse	North Yorkshire	54.16°N 02.50°W	SD6774
West Houses	Lincolnshire	53.06°N 00.01°W	TF3354
Westhouses	Derbyshire	53.10°N 01.37°W	SK4257
West Howe	Bournemouth	50.75°N 01.93°W	SZ0595
West Howetown	Somerset	51.09°N 03.55°W	SS9134
Westhumble	Surrey	51.24°N 00.33°W	TQ1651
West Huntspill	Somerset	51.19°N 03.00°W	ST3044
West Hurn	Bournemouth	50.76°N 01.84°W	SZ1196
West Hyde	Hertfordshire	51.60°N 00.51°W	TQ0391
West Hynish	Argyll and Bute	56.44°N 06.93°W	NL9639
West Hythe	Kent	51.06°N 01.02°E	TR1234

=== West I – West J ===
Location	Locality	Coordinates (links to map & photo sources)	OS grid reference
West Ilkerton	Devon	51.19°N 03.86°W	SS7046
West Ilsley	Berkshire	51.53°N 01.32°W	SU4782
Westing	Shetland Islands	60.72°N 00.95°W	HP5705
Westington	Gloucestershire	52.04°N 01.79°W	SP1438
West Itchenor	West Sussex	50.80°N 00.88°W	SU7901
West Jesmond	Newcastle upon Tyne	54.98°N 01.61°W	NZ2566

=== West K ===
Location	Locality	Coordinates (links to map & photo sources)	OS grid reference
West Keal	Lincolnshire	53.14°N 00.03°E	TF3663
West Kennett	Wiltshire	51.41°N 01.84°W	SU1168
West Kensington	Hammersmith and Fulham	51.48°N 00.21°W	TQ2478
West Kilbride	North Ayrshire	55.69°N 04.86°W	NS2048
West Kilbride	Western Isles	57.10°N 07.36°W	NF7514
West Kilburn	Royal Borough of Kensington and Chelsea	51.52°N 00.21°W	TQ2482
West Kingsdown	Kent	51.34°N 00.25°E	TQ5763
West Kingston	West Sussex	50.79°N 00.46°W	TQ0801
West Kington	Wiltshire	51.49°N 02.28°W	ST8077
West Kington Wick	Wiltshire	51.48°N 02.27°W	ST8176
West Kirby	Wirral	53.36°N 03.18°W	SJ2186
West Knapton	North Yorkshire	54.16°N 00.66°W	SE8775
West Knighton	Dorset	50.68°N 02.38°W	SY7387
West Knoyle	Wiltshire	51.08°N 02.21°W	ST8532
West Kyo	Durham	54.86°N 01.73°W	NZ1752
Westlake	Devon	50.36°N 03.94°W	SX6253

=== West L ===
Location	Locality	Coordinates (links to map & photo sources)	OS grid reference
West Lambrook	Somerset	50.95°N 02.84°W	ST4118
Westland Green	Hertfordshire	51.86°N 00.06°E	TL4221
Westlands	Staffordshire	52.99°N 02.23°W	SJ8444
Westlands	Worcestershire	52.27°N 02.17°W	SO8864
West Langdon	Kent	51.17°N 01.30°E	TR3147
West Langwell	Highland	58.04°N 04.22°W	NC6908
West Lavington	West Sussex	50.97°N 00.73°W	SU8920
West Lavington	Wiltshire	51.26°N 02.00°W	SU0052
West Layton	North Yorkshire	54.48°N 01.78°W	NZ1410
West Lea	Durham	54.83°N 01.37°W	NZ4049
Westlea	Northumberland	55.12°N 01.62°W	NZ2481
Westlea	Swindon	51.55°N 01.82°W	SU1284
West Leake	Nottinghamshire	52.82°N 01.22°W	SK5226
West Learmouth	Northumberland	55.62°N 02.25°W	NT8437
West Leigh	Devon	50.82°N 03.87°W	SS6805
Westleigh (near Burlescombe)	Devon	50.94°N 03.33°W	ST0617
Westleigh (near Instow)	Devon	51.03°N 04.18°W	SS4728
Westleigh	Wigan	53.50°N 02.54°W	SD6401
West Leigh	Hampshire	50.86°N 00.97°W	SU7208
West Leigh	Somerset	51.06°N 03.27°W	ST1130
Westleton	Suffolk	52.26°N 01.57°E	TM4469
West Lexham	Norfolk	52.71°N 00.72°E	TF8417
Westley	Shropshire	52.64°N 02.94°W	SJ3606
Westley	Suffolk	52.24°N 00.66°E	TL8264
Westley Heights	Essex	51.54°N 00.42°E	TQ6886
Westley Waterless	Cambridgeshire	52.17°N 00.36°E	TL6256
West Lilling	North Yorkshire	54.07°N 01.02°W	SE6465
West Linga	Shetland Islands	60.36°N 01.03°W	HU531645
Westlington	Buckinghamshire	51.78°N 00.89°W	SP7610
Westlinton	Cumbria	54.96°N 02.95°W	NY3964
West Linton	Scottish Borders	55.74°N 03.35°W	NT1551
West Liss	Hampshire	51.04°N 00.90°W	SU7728
West Littleton	South Gloucestershire	51.47°N 02.34°W	ST7675
West Lockinge	Oxfordshire	51.58°N 01.39°W	SU4287
West Looe	Cornwall	50.35°N 04.46°W	SX2553
West Luccombe	Somerset	51.20°N 03.59°W	SS8946
West Lulworth	Dorset	50.61°N 02.25°W	SY8280
West Lutton	North Yorkshire	54.10°N 00.57°W	SE9369
West Lydford	Somerset	51.07°N 02.62°W	ST5631
West Lydiatt	Herefordshire	52.08°N 02.65°W	SO5543
West Lyn	Devon	51.21°N 03.83°W	SS7248
West Lyng	Somerset	51.04°N 02.98°W	ST3128
West Lynn	Norfolk	52.75°N 00.38°E	TF6120
