= Craig Leith =

Craig Leith may be (in Scotland):

- Craig Leith (hill), in the Ochil Hills
- Craigleith, an island
- Craigleith, Edinburgh, a suburb
