= Xishan =

Xishan may refer to the following locations in China:

- Western Hills (西山), mountain range in the west of Beijing
- Western Mountains (西山), mountain range located 12 km west of Kunming in Yunnan
- Xishan (锡山, Xīshān, lit. "Tin Hill"), a hill in Wuxi's Xihui Park
- Xishan District, Wuxi (锡山区), Jiangsu
  - Xishan Senior High School
- Xishan District, Kunming (西山区), Yunnan
- Xishan, Guiping (西山镇), town in Guangxi
- Xishan Island, Jiangsu
- Xishan Community, a village-level division in Liaoning
- Xishan Township (disambiguation)
- Xishan Forest Park, Yunnan
- Xishan, the former name of Xianyueshan in Hunan

== People ==
- Wang Xishan, Chinese astronomer, almanac maker, and mathematician
- Yan Xishan, Chinese general, warlord, and politician

== Other ==
- Xishan Coal and Electricity Power, a Chinese coal company
- Xishan Coal Electricity Group, a Chinese coal company
- Xishan Society, a group from Shanxi

== See also ==
- 西山 (disambiguation), including Japanese uses
- Nishiyama (disambiguation), most common Japanese reading
