= Nishiyama =

Nishiyama (Japanese: 西山, "western mountain") may refer to:

== People with the surname ==
- Hidetaka Nishiyama, American martial arts exponent and founder of Shotokan
- Kazutaka Nishiyama, Japanese baseball player
- Keiki Nishiyama, Japanese volleyball player
- Kiyoshi Nishiyama (西山 清; 1893–1983), Japanese photographer
- Kiyoshi Nishiyama (handballer) (西山 清; born 1959), Japanese handball player
- Koutaro Nishiyama (西山 宏太朗; born 1991), Japanese voice actor and singer
- Michitaka Nishiyama (西山 道隆; born 1980), Japanese baseball player
- Misa Nishiyama (西山 実沙; born 2010), Japanese artistic gymnast
- Norio Nishiyama, Japanese mixed martial artist
- Rei Nishiyama, Japanese softball player
- Shunta Nishiyama (西山 峻太; born 1989), Japanese footballer
- Soin Nishiyama, Tokugawa-era poet
- Taiga Nishiyama (西山 大雅; born 1999), Japanese footballer
- Takahisa Nishiyama, Japanese soccer player
- Takashi Nishiyama, Japanese video game developer
- Teppei Nishiyama, Japanese football player
- Tomoka Nishiyama, Japanese shogi player
- Uzō Nishiyama (西山 夘三; 1911–1994), Japanese architect, city planner and architectural scholar
- Yusuke Nishiyama (footballer) (西山 雄介; born 1994), Japanese footballer
- Yusuke Nishiyama (runner) (西山 雄介; born 1994), Japanese long-distance runner

Fictional characters

- Kankuro Nishiyama, a character in the manga/anime Muteki Kanban Musume

== Places ==
- Nishiyama, Niigata
- Nishiyama Station (disambiguation), name of two different railway stations in Japan

== Other uses ==
- Nishiyama Craters, volcanic craters in Shikotsu-Tōya National Park, Hokkaido
- 6745 Nishiyama, an asteroid

== See also ==
- 西山 (disambiguation)
- Xishan (disambiguation)
