= St Martin de Porres School (Ghana) =

Private co-educational school in Ghana

Location
- Dansoman, Greater Accra Region.West Hills,Greater Accra; Ghana
- Coordinates: 5.560547°N 0.264275°W

Information
- Type: Private
- Established: 1973 (53 years ago)
- Founder: Florence Laast
- Educational authority: Ghana Education Service
- Superintendent: Samuel Addison
- School code: 0119058
- President: Florence Laast
- Director: William Laast
- Headmistress: Shiela Turpin
- Headmaster: Victor Kablan
- Gender: Co-educational
- Campuses: Dansoman and West Hills
- Website: martindeporresgh.com

St Martin de Porres School (SMDP) is private co-educational school in Dansoman and West Hills in the Greater Accra Region of Ghana.

== History ==
The school was founded on October 3, 1973 by Florence Laast. The school celebrated its 50th anniversary in 2023.

== Curriculum ==
It offers the basic curriculum as prescribed by the Ghana Education Service (GES).

== Facilities ==
In addition to classrooms, the school has a fully equipped information and communications technology lab, science laboratory, library and basketball court, and a decent football pitch.

== See also ==
- Education in Ghana
- List of schools in Ghana
