= West Lynn =

West Lynn may refer to:

- West Lynn, Norfolk, part of King's Lynn, Norfolk, England
- West Lynn, Massachusetts
- West Lynn Township, McLeod County, Minnesota

== See also ==
- West Linn, Oregon
- West Lyn, Devon, England
- West Lyn River, England
