= Michitaka =

- Gender: Male

Origin
- Word/name: Japanese
- Meaning: Different meanings depending on the kanji used

Michitaka (written: 道孝, 道隆, 通孝 or 倫孝) is a masculine Japanese given name. Notable people with the name include:

- Michitaka Akimoto (秋本 倫孝, born 1982), Japanese footballer
- Fujiwara no Michitaka (藤原 道隆, 953–995), Japanese kugyō
- Michitaka Kinami (木南 道孝, 1920–2008), Japanese hurdler
- Michitaka Kobayashi (小林 通孝, born 1955), Japanese voice actor
- Kujō Michitaka (九条 道孝, 1839–1906), Japanese kuge
- Michitaka Nishiyama (西山 道隆, born 1980), Japanese baseball player
