= WHHS (disambiguation) =

WHHS is a radio station.

WHHS may also refer to:

- Walnut Hills High School (Cincinnati, Ohio)
- West Haven High School, Connecticut
- West Hempstead High School, New York (Long Island)
- West Hills High School. Santee, California
- Westchester Hebrew High School, Mamaroneck, New York (Hudson Valley)
- Western Heights High School, Rotorua, New Zealand
- Western Hills High School (disambiguation), several schools
- Westmont Hilltop High School, Cambria County, Pennsylvania
- Whitehouse High School, Texas
- White House High School, Tennessee
- Wilmer-Hutchins High School, Dallas, Texas
- Winter Haven High School, Florida
- Woodland Hills High School, Woodland Hills, Pennsylvania (Pittsburgh area)
