= Eikan-dō Zenrin-ji =

Buddhist temple in Kyoto, Japan

Coordinates: 35°0′52.29″N 135°47′43.05″E

Eikan-dō Zenrin-ji 永観堂禅林寺
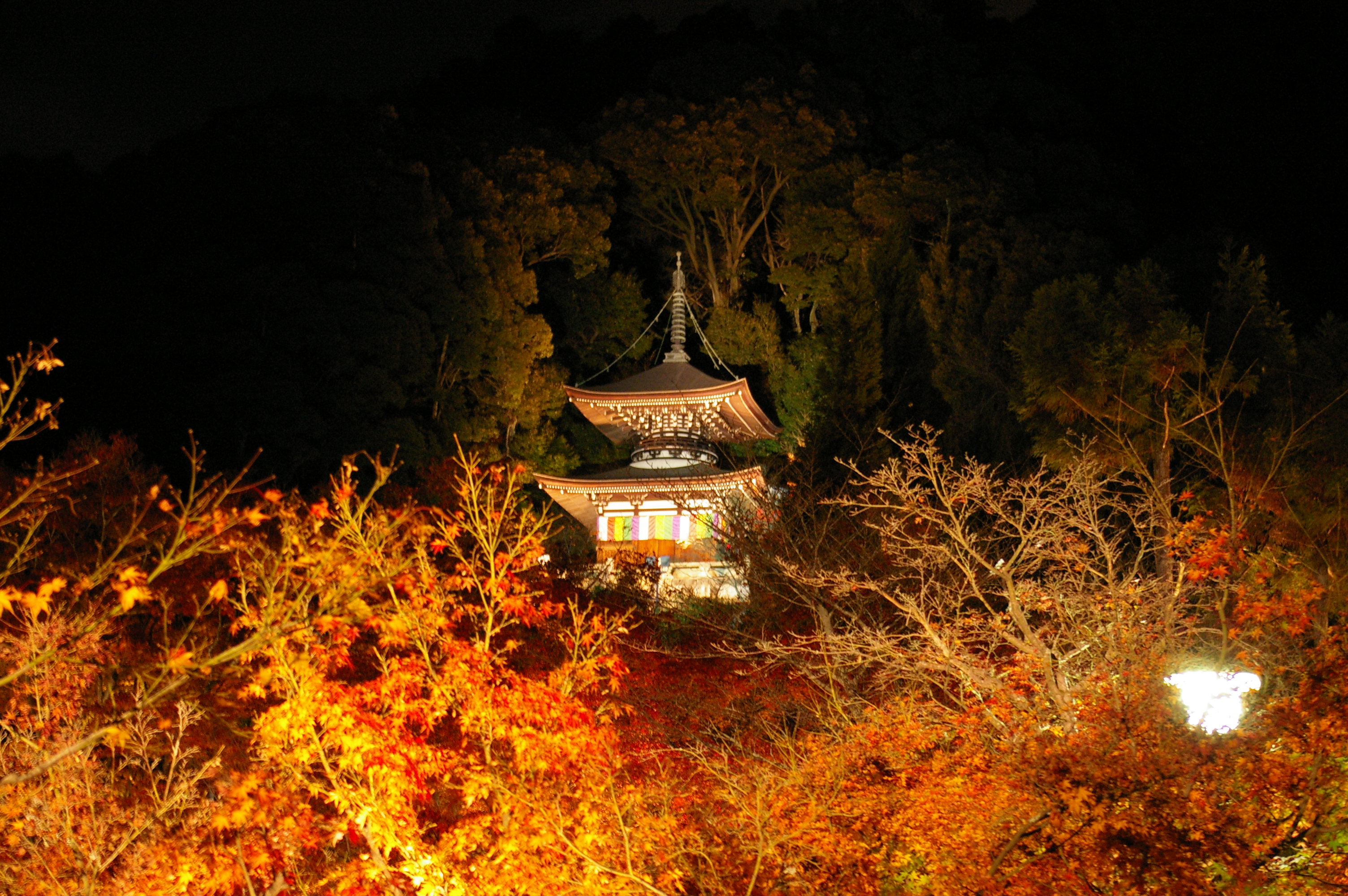
- Tahōtō rising above the fall foliage

Religion
- Affiliation: Jōdo shū, Seizan branch

Location
- Location: Eikandō-chō 48, Sakyō-ku, Kyoto
- Country: Japan
- Interactive map of Eikan-dō Zenrin-ji 永観堂禅林寺

Architecture
- Founder: Shinshō
- Established: 853
- Completed: 1912 (Reconstruction)

Website
- http://www.eikando.or.jp/

Eikan-dō Zenrin-ji (永観堂禅林寺) is the head temple for the Seizan branch of Japan's Jōdo-shū (Pure Land) Buddhist sect, located in Kyoto, Sakyō-ku. It was founded by Shinshō, a pupil of Kūkai, and is famous for its fall foliage and for its prominence in the past as a center of learning.

== Names ==
The temple is commonly referred to as either just "Eikan-dō" (永観堂, "View of Eternity Hall" or "Hall of Yōkan") or "Zenrin-ji" (禅林寺, "Temple of Forest of Zen"). However, it also has two other names. "Shōju-raigō-san" (聖衆来迎山) translates roughly to "Mountain where the saints welcome you", while "Muryōsu-in" (無量寿院) means roughly "Temple of Immeasurable Life".

== History ==
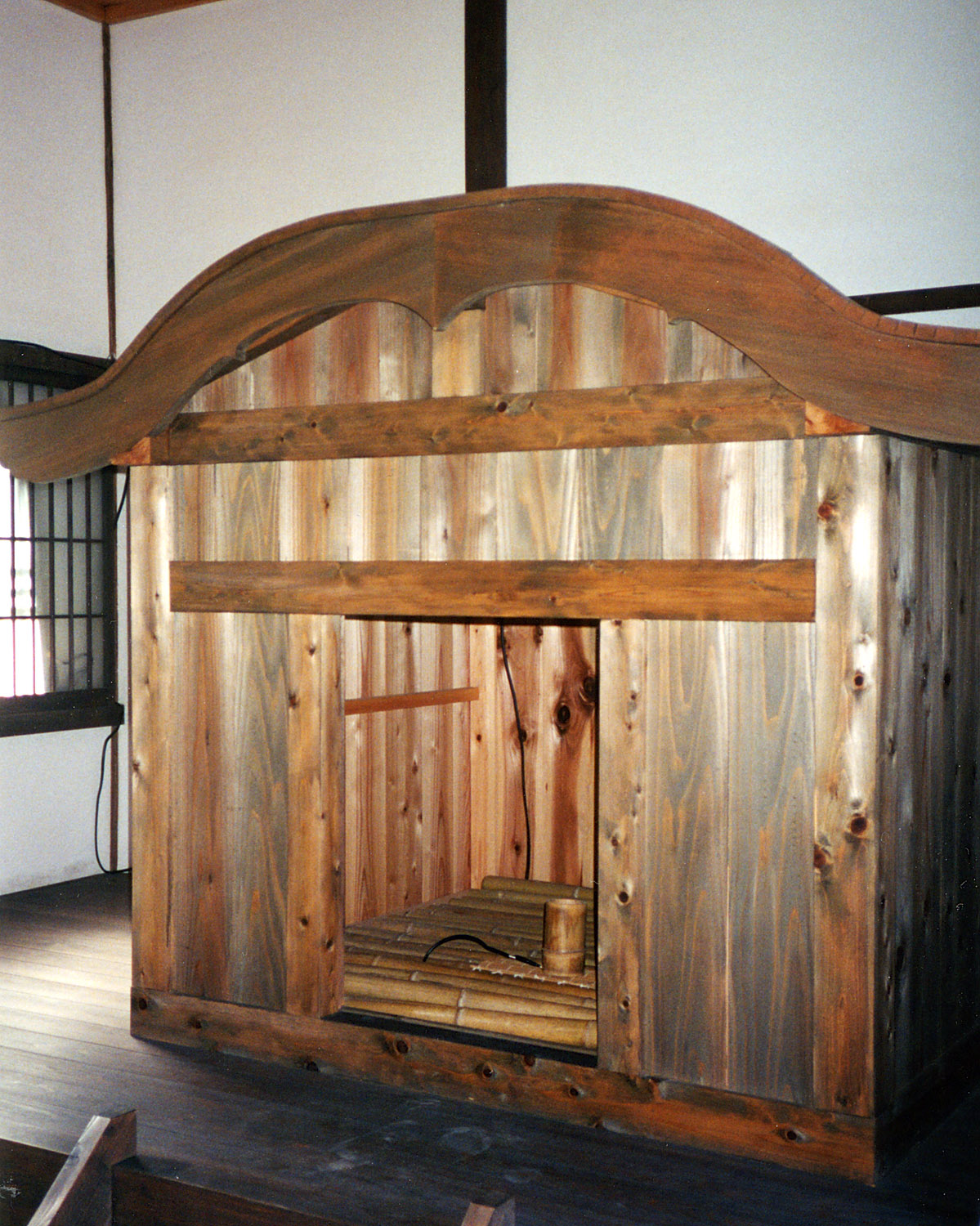
A bathroom, akin to a modern sauna

The temple got its start when Kūkai's pupil, the monk Shinshō, aspired to found a temple for the worship of the Gochi Nyorai, or Five Wisdom Buddhas. In 853, he purchased the mansion of Fujiwara no Sekio for this purpose. The construction of temples was forbidden in Kyoto at the time, however, and so it was not until ten years later, when formal Imperial approval was granted by Emperor Seiwa, that the Zenrin-ji was formally founded.

Though originally devoted to the Shingon sect, beginning in the time of Yōkan (永観, 1033–1111), the seventh head monk, the temple began to shift towards Jōdo-shū, a sect formally established roughly a century later in 1175. Yōkan had trained in a number of temples of different disciplines in Nara, and was a passionate devotee of the Amida Buddha. In 1072, he established a Yakuō-in (薬王院) on the grounds, which organized giving to the needy and caring for the ill. He also introduced the practice of Nenbutsu, a Chinese practice which was quite new in Japan, into the temple, and cultivated its observance among the monks and devotees.

Zenrin-ji has grown famous for its unusual statue of the Amida Buddha, which looks over its shoulder, rather than straight ahead. In Japanese this is called the Mikaeri Amida. According to tradition, at one point in 1082, when Yōkan was fifty, he and a number of monks were practicing a ritual, walking around the statue and reciting sutras when the statue of Amida came to life and stepped down from its dais. Yōkan halted the ritual in surprise; the Buddha looked over its shoulder at the monk, and said to him, "Yōkan you are slow". Ever since then, goes the story, the posture of this statue has remained in that position. Alternate versions of the story involve the Buddha joining the monks in a ritual dance.

The twelfth head of the temple, Jōhen (1166–1224), originally a Shingon monk like the rest at Zenrin-ji, was a disciple of Hōnen, one of the founders of Jōdo-shū; Jōhen was thus the first head of Zenrin-ji to be a formal devotee of this emerging sect. He was succeeded as head monk by Shōkū (1177–1247), and it was under Shōkū's successor, Shōon (1201–1271), that the temple formally became devoted to Jōdo-shū.

== Grounds ==
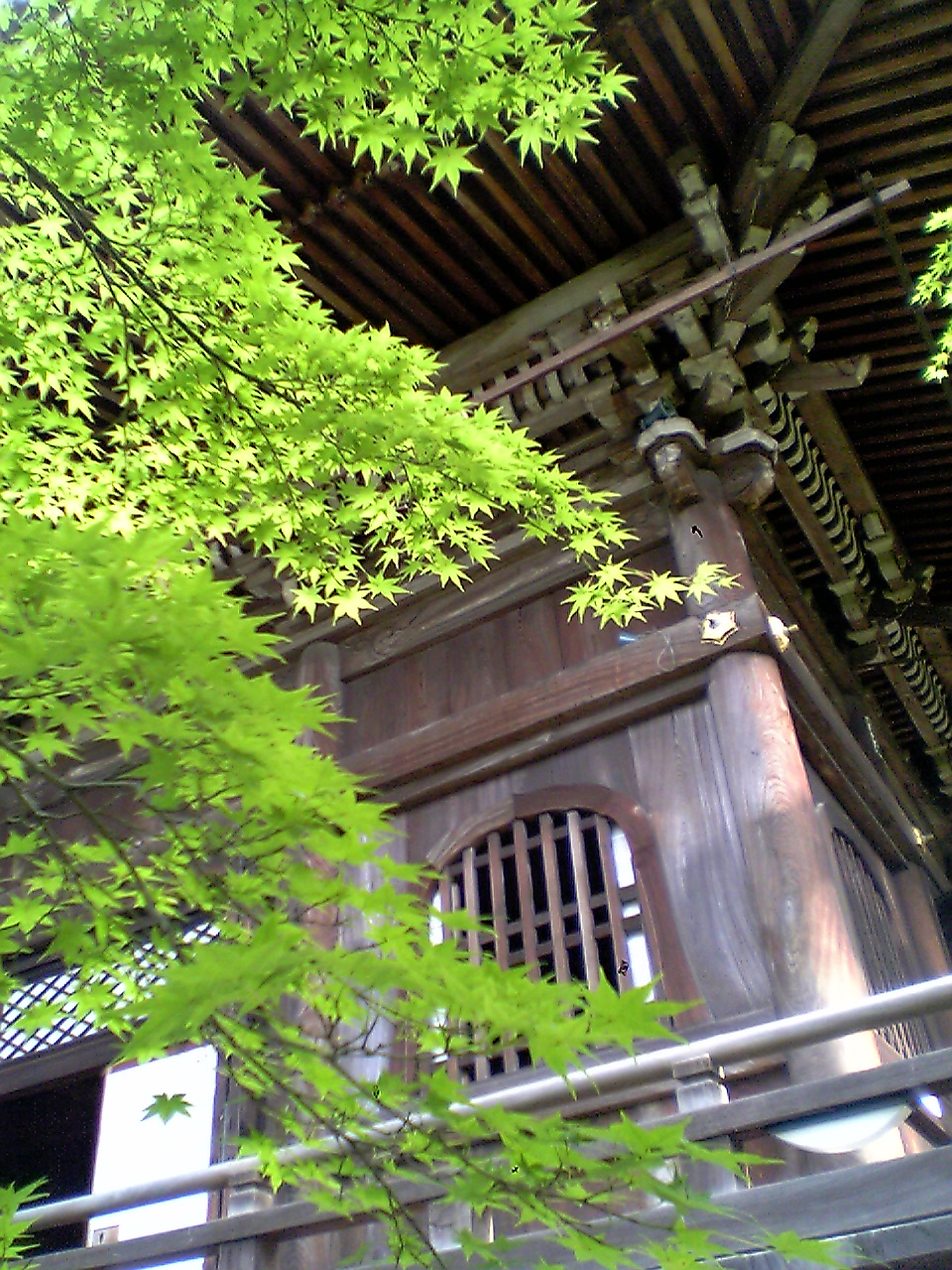
The Founder's Hall

The Zenrin-ji compound is nestled in Kyoto's Eastern Mountain (Higashiyama), and its buildings, most of them connected by covered walkways and staircases, are scattered among a range of heights.

- Main gate – the Kōrai-mon (高麗門) is named after the ancient Korean kingdom of Goguryeo (Kōrai in Japanese). The current structure dates from the late Edo period (mid-19th century).
- Inner gate – the Yakui-mon (薬医門), along with the Kōrai-mon, derive from the fortress gates that would have surrounded the aristocratic mansion before it became a temple. Their placement and architecture are said to still reflect these origins today. The current structure dates to 1744.
- Founder's Hall (御影堂, Goe-dō) – enshrines and honors Hōnen, the founder of Jōdo-shū. The current structure was completed in 1912, and is larger than the Amida Hall.
- Amida Hall (阿弥陀堂, Amida-dō) – the famous Amida statue which is the central object of worship for the temple, is enshrined here. The hall is seated higher on the mountain than the Founder's Hall; the current structure was built at the beginning of the 17th century.
- Tahōtō – the temple's tower is situated at the highest point in the compound, and offers the greatest view of the scenery. The current structure was completed in 1928.
- Zen Chief Priests' Chamber (方丈, Hōjō) – despite Zenrin-ji's name, it is not a temple of Zen Buddhism; nevertheless, the compound includes this priests' chamber in the Zen style. Its construction is said to have been ordered by Emperor Go-Kashiwabara (r. 1500–1526), but was not built until the Edo period.

== Treasures ==
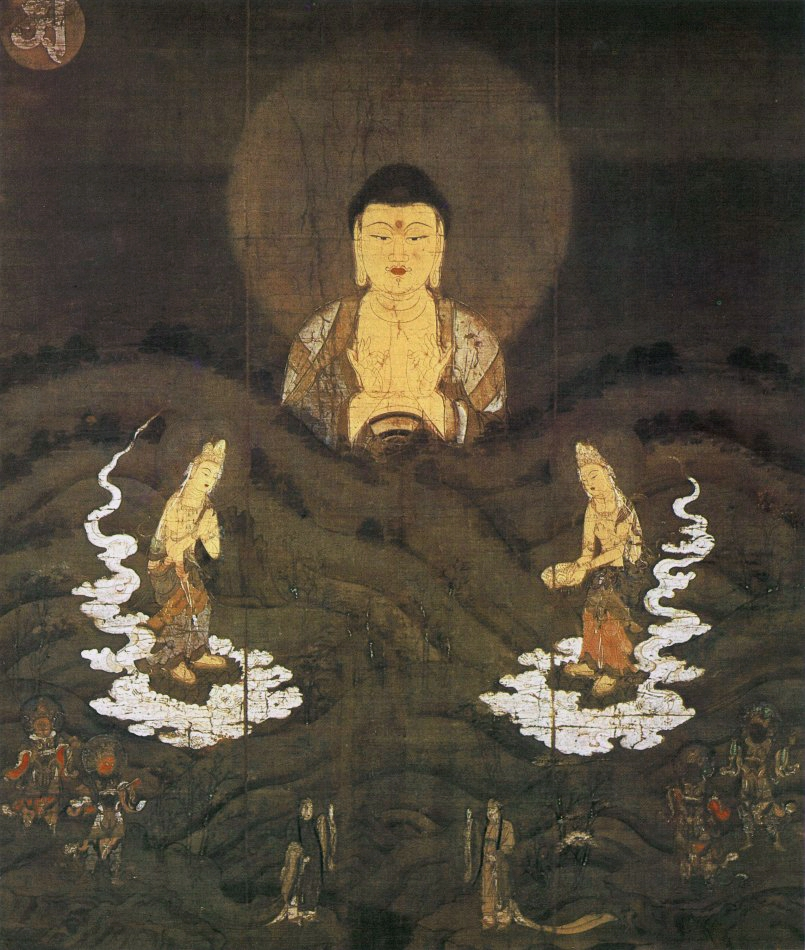
Descent of Amitabha over the Mountain or Yamagoe no Amida (山越えの阿弥陀), a cultural treasure from Eikando Temple. Note the seed syllable "a" for Amida on the upper-left.

In addition to the famous Amida statue, which is designated an Important Cultural Property by the Japanese government, there are a great many cultural treasures stored in Zenrin-ji's Tahōtō. These primary consist of paintings of a variety of Buddhist subjects, including images of Amida, Shakyamuni, Yakushi Nyorai, and the Parinirvana of the Buddha. Paintings by Kanō Motonobu, Tosa Mitsunobu, and Hasegawa Tōhaku are also kept by the temple.

The wooden Amida statue is 77 cm in height, and though for a long time believed to date from the Kamakura period (1185–1333), is now thought to have been carved somewhat earlier in the 12th century (Heian period, 794–1185). This change in dating came about with the comparison to Song dynasty (960–1279) sculptures in Sichuan Province which show strong similarities in style. Zenrin-ji's Amida statue was formally named an Important Cultural Property in 1999.

== Gallery ==
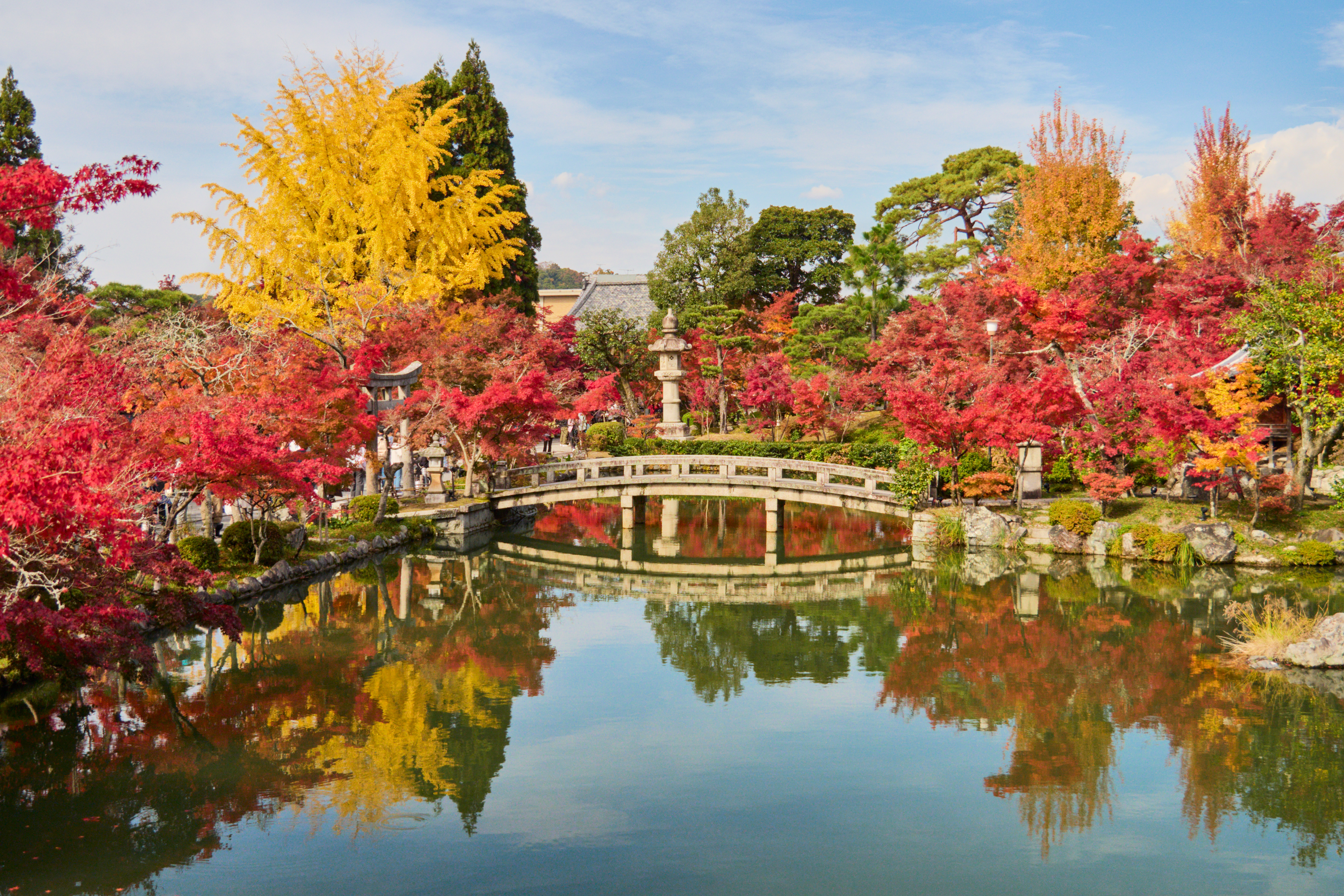

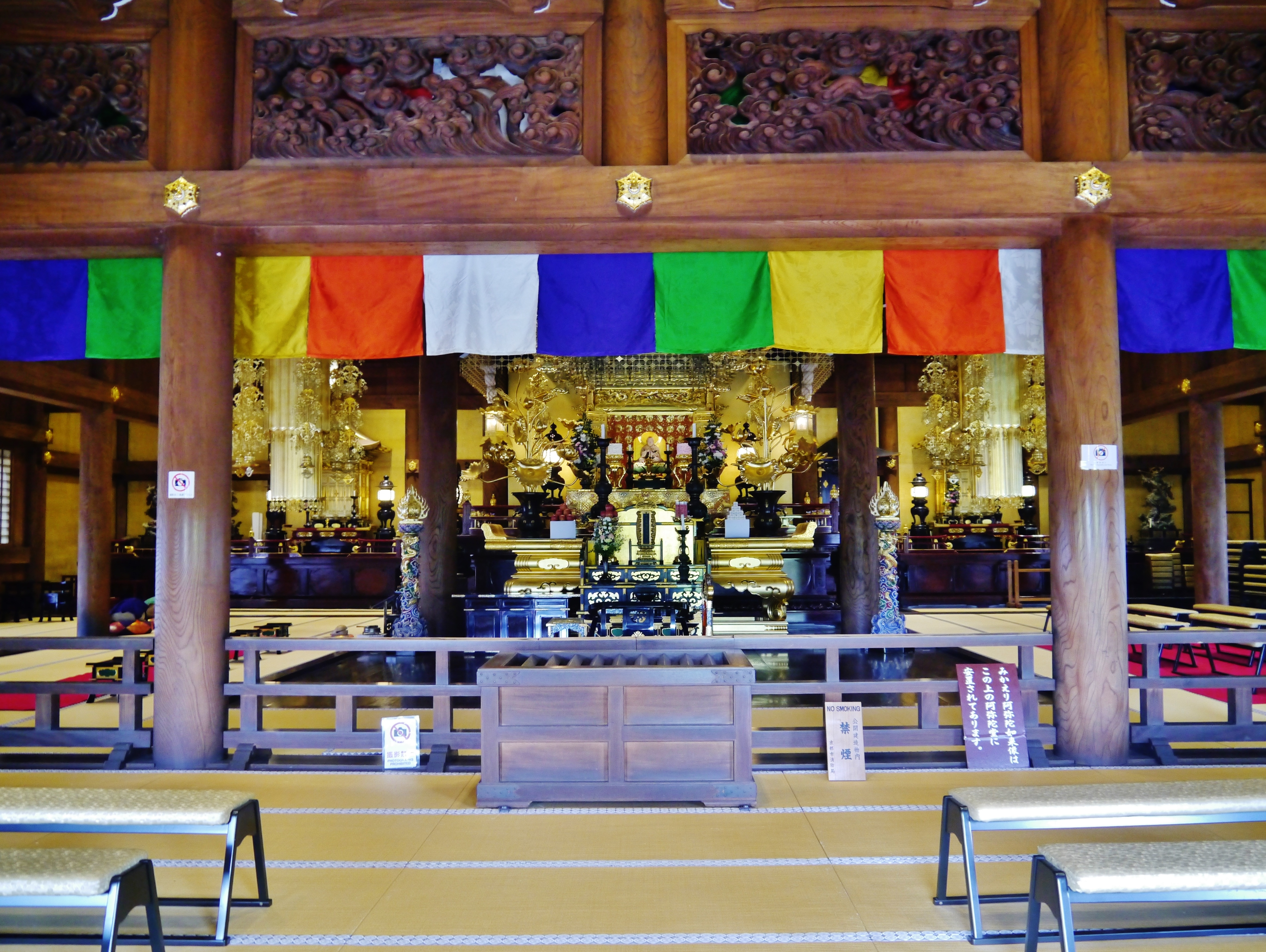

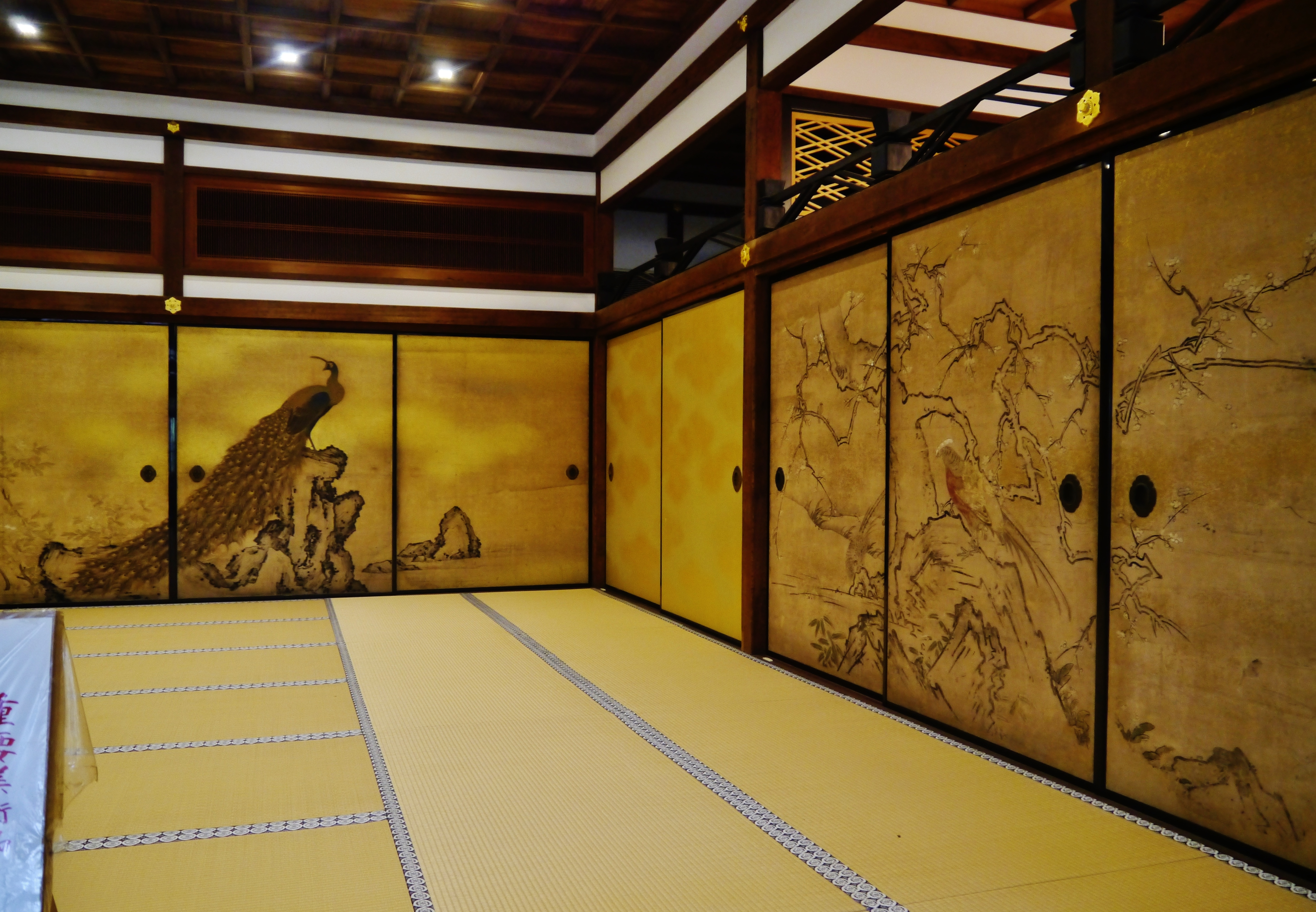

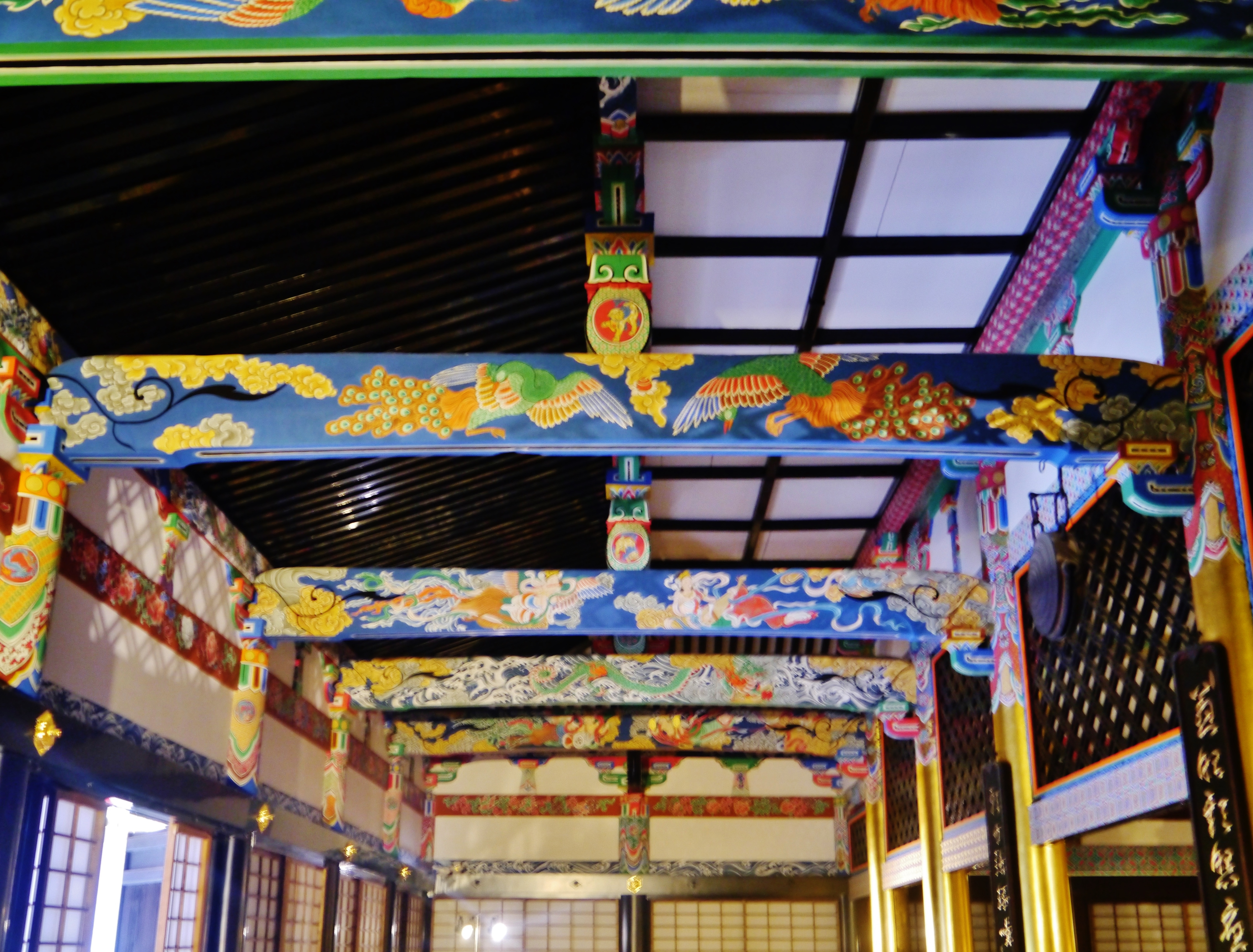

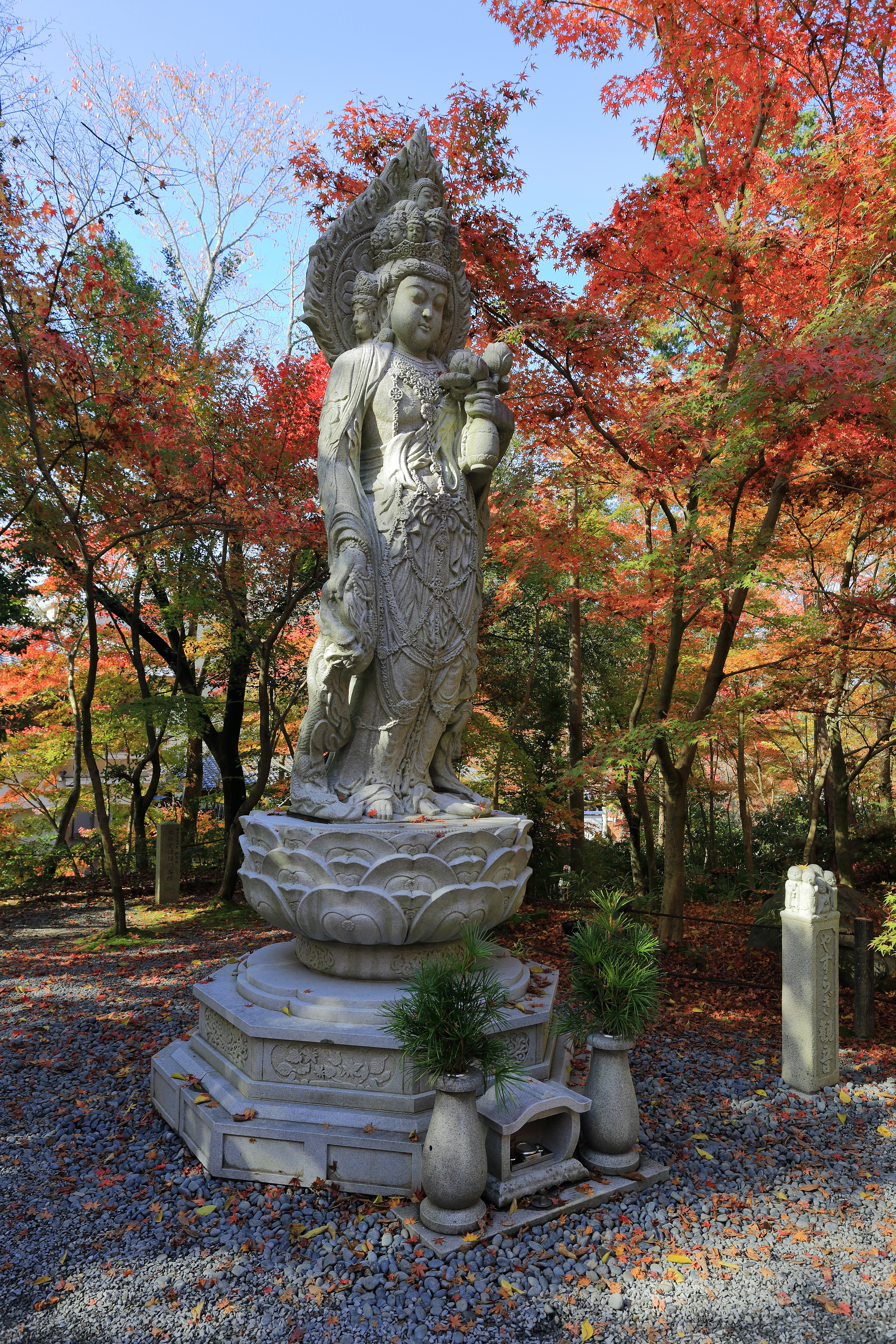

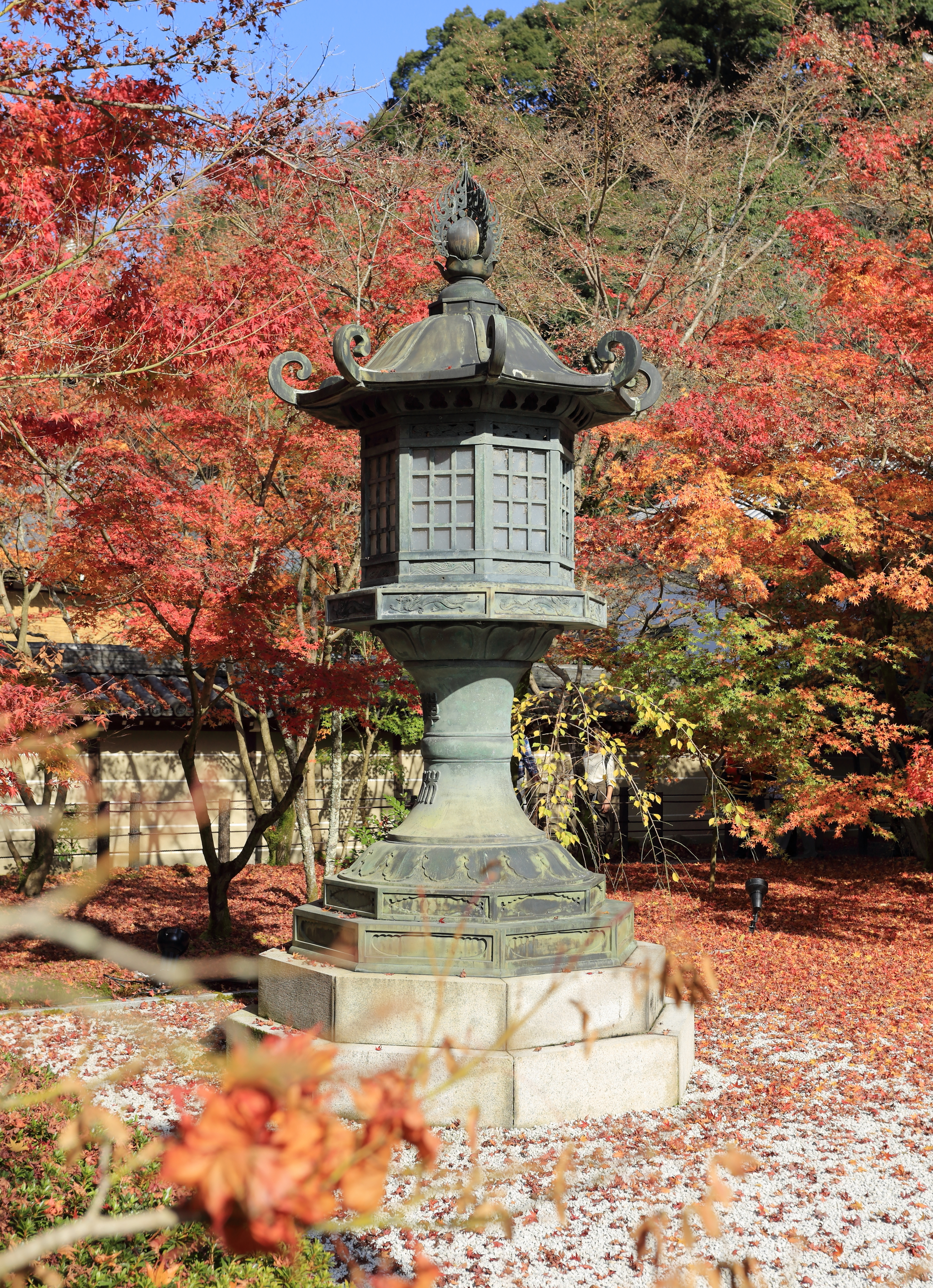

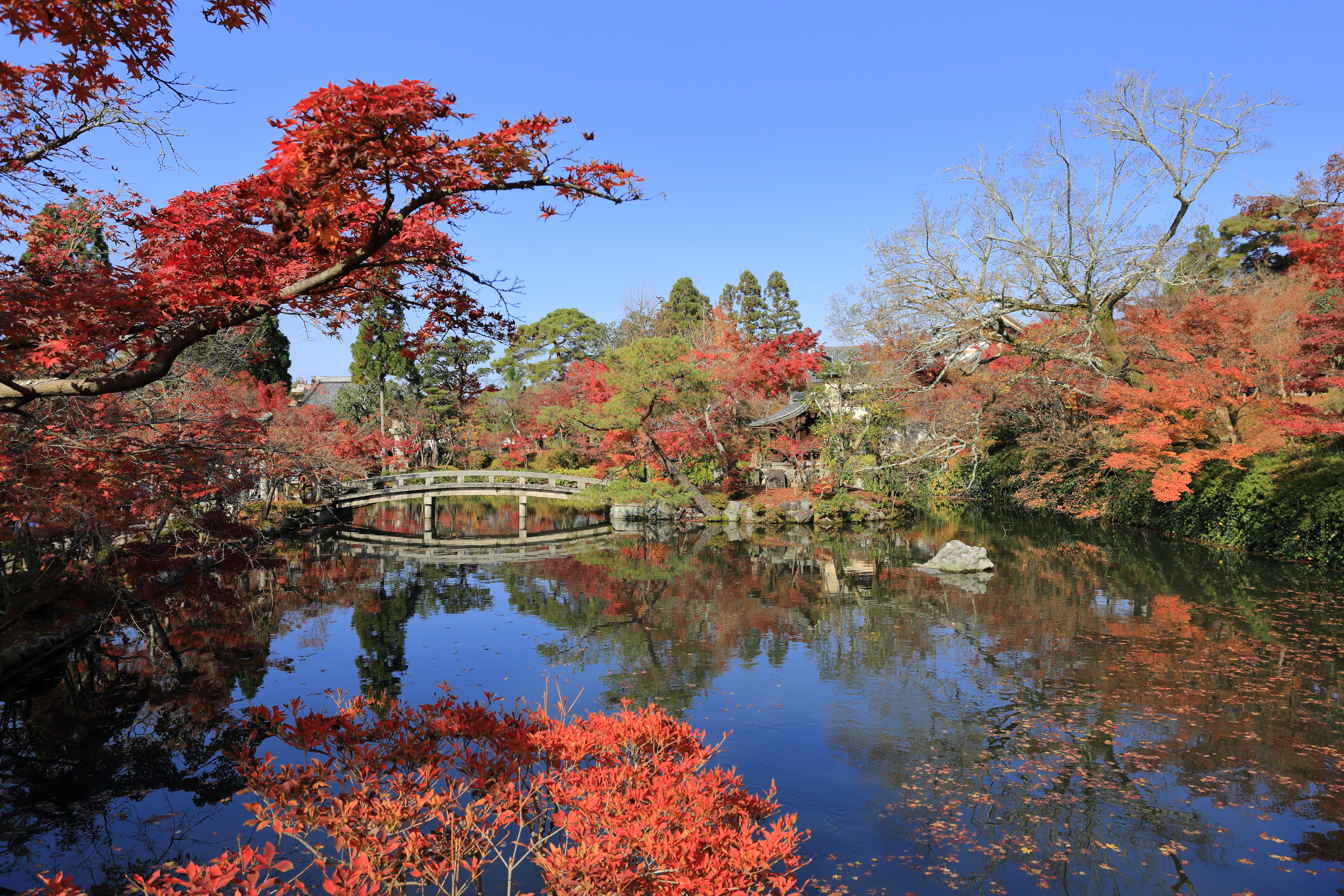

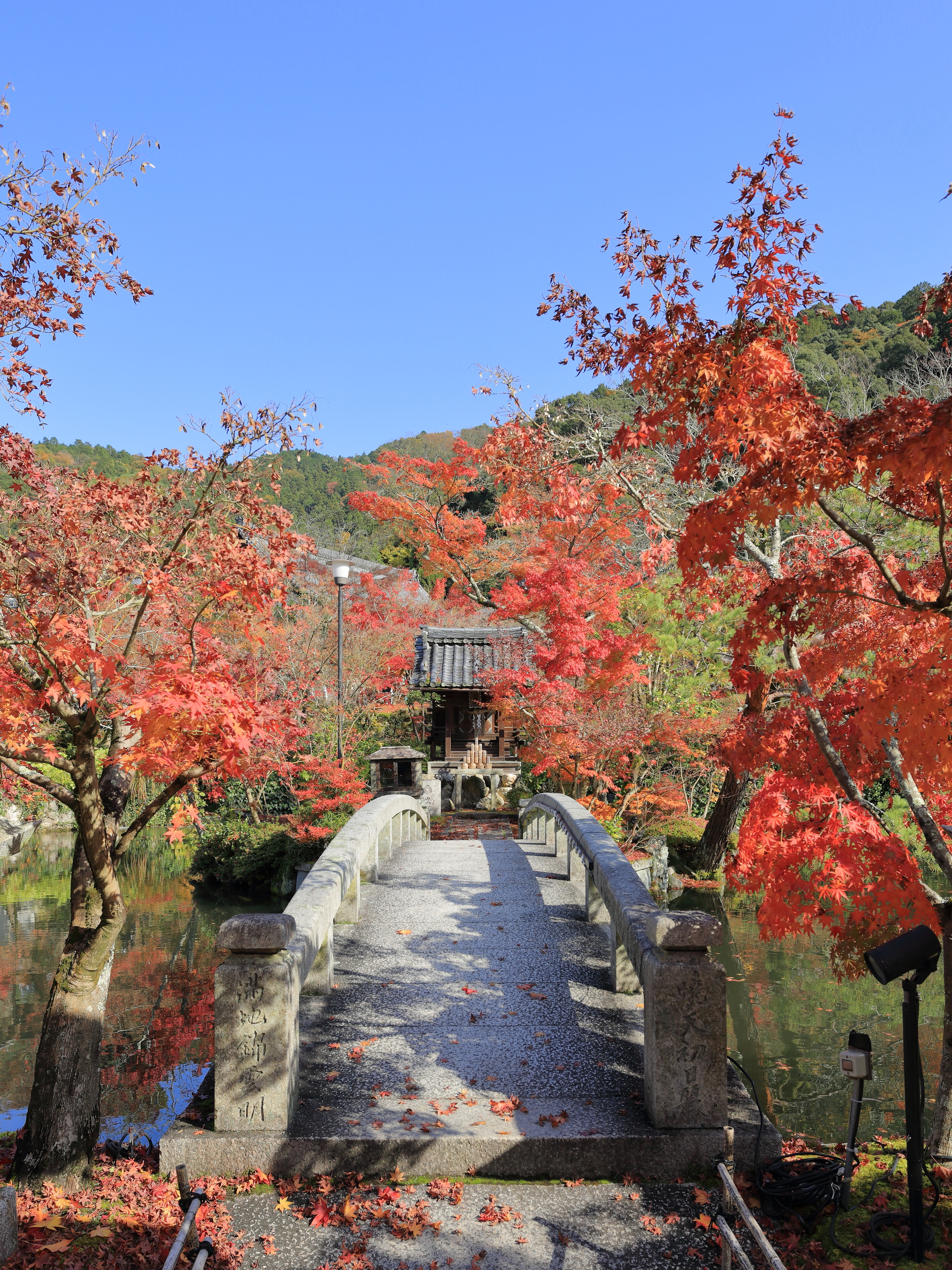

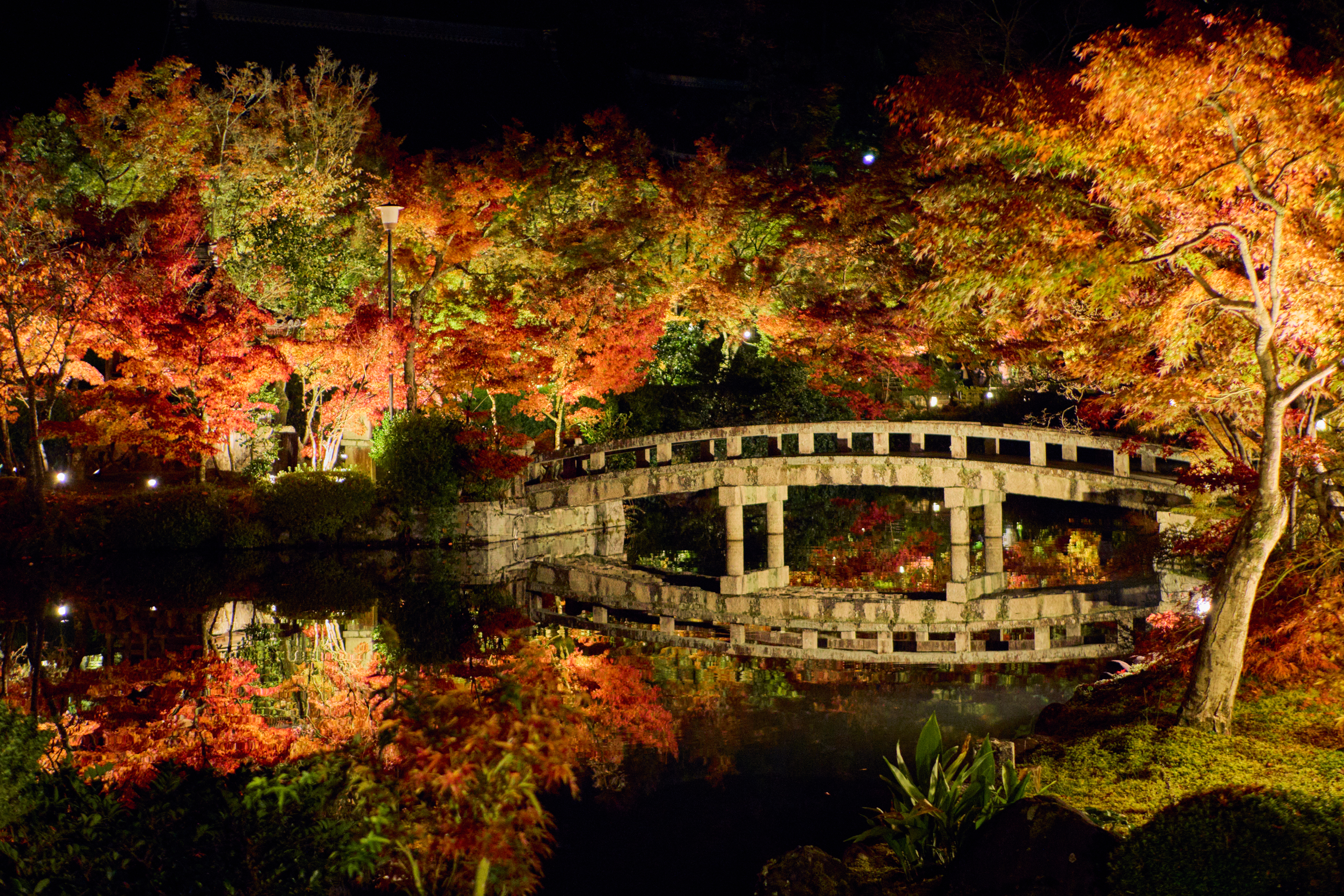

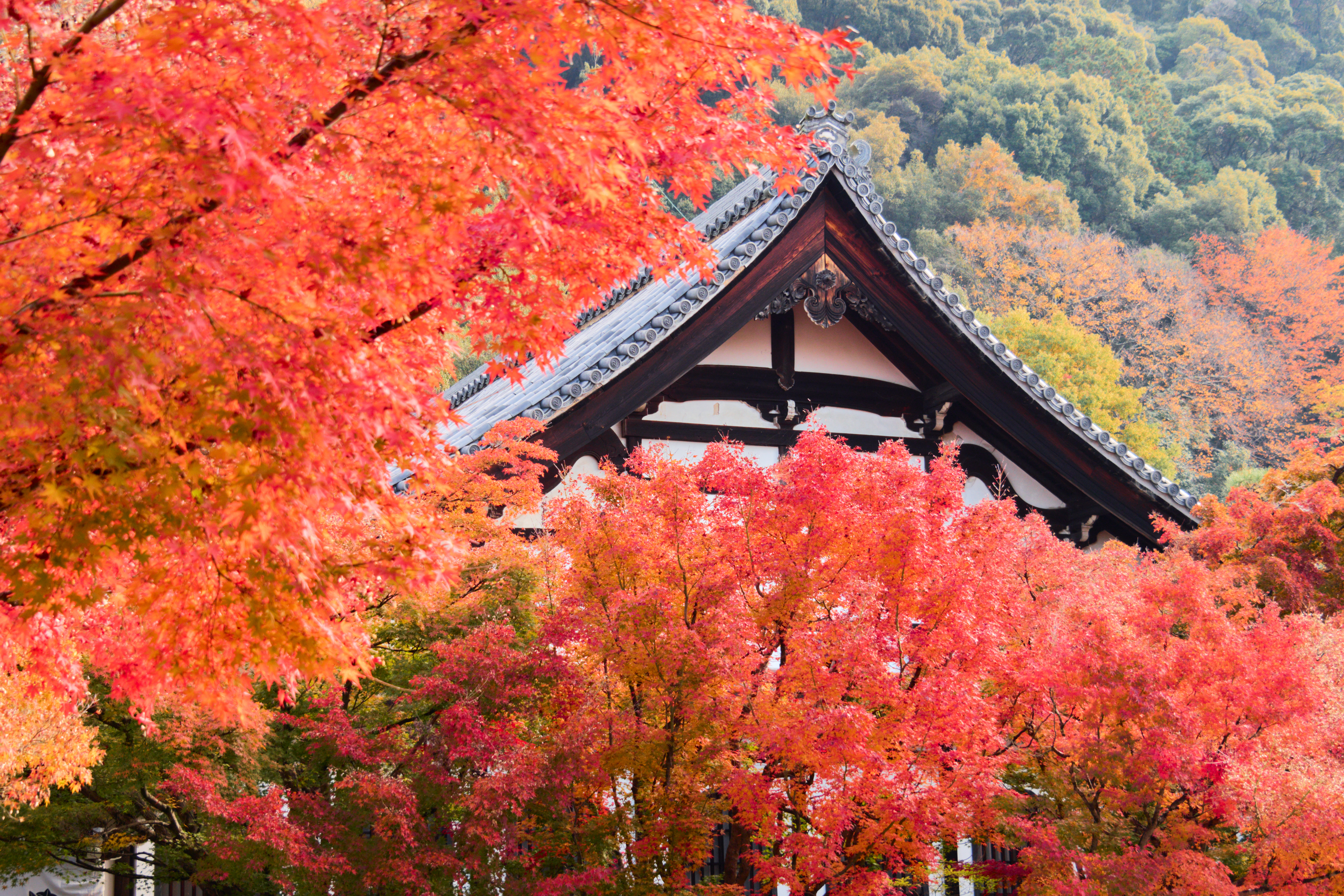

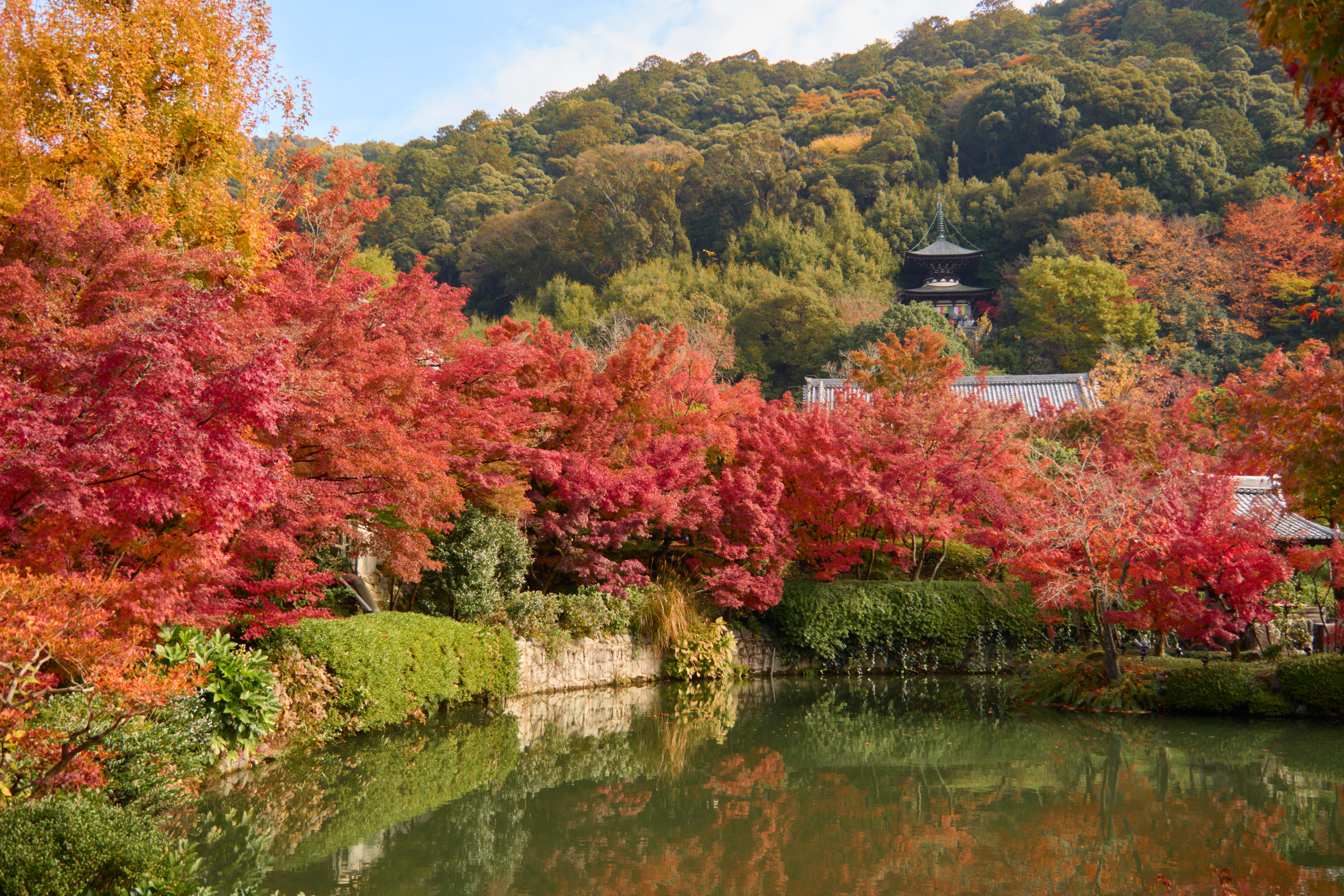

== See also ==
- List of National Treasures of Japan (paintings)
- List of National Treasures of Japan (crafts-others)
