= West Hill Historic District =

West Hill Historic District may refer to:

in the United States

- West Hill Historic District (West Hartford, Connecticut), listed on the National Register of Historic Places in Connecticut
- West Hill Historic District (Muscatine, Iowa), listed on the NRHP in Iowa
- West Hill Residential Historic District, listed on the NRHP in Wisconsin

== See also ==
- West Hill (disambiguation)
