= West Hills =

West Hills may refer to:

- West Hills, Los Angeles, California
- West Hills (New Haven), a neighborhood in the Amity area of New Haven, Connecticut
- West Hills, Baltimore, Maryland, a neighborhood
- West Hills, New York
- West Hills (Pennsylvania), the western suburbs of Pittsburgh
- West Hills, Pennsylvania
- West Hills, Knoxville, Tennessee)
- West Hills (Box Elder County, Utah), a mountain range
- Tualatin Mountains, a.k.a. the West Hills of Portland, Oregon, United States
- West Hills Community College District, a community college district located in California, with campuses in Coalinga, Lemoore, etc.
- "West Hills", a song by the Killers, 2021

== See also ==
- West Hill (disambiguation)
- Western Hills (disambiguation)
- 西山
