= 西山 =

西山 is an East Asian name meaning "Western mountain" or "Western mountains".

西山 may refer to:

- Xishan (disambiguation) (xīshān), the Chinese pinyin transliteration
- Nishiyama (disambiguation), the Japanese transliteration of native Japanese reading
- Seizan, Japanese transliteration of borrowed Chinese reading
  - Shōkū, Buddhist monk, also called Seizan
  - Seizan, Buddhist sect, named for the monk
