= Anjin Ketsujō Shō =

The Anjin Ketsujō Shō (安心決定鈔; "Essence of the Determination of the Settled Mind") (AKS) is a Japanese Pure Land Buddhist text which is influential in the Seizan and Jōdo Shinshū traditions. The work was written soon after the time of Hōnen, and modern Japanese scholars argue that it was likely written in the Seizan branch of Jōdo-shū.

As its title indicates, the Anjin Ketsujō Shō focuses on the key Pure Land Buddhist topics of the "settled mind" or "peaceful mind", which is another term for true entrusting (shinjin) in Buddha Amida, and on the idea of "assurance" (ketsujō) of one's future birth in the Pure Land of Sukhavati. Modern scholars are unsure of the author of the AKS, though most Japanese scholars now accept the view that it was written in the Seizan school, possibly by Shōkū (1177–1247).

By the 14th century, the text had become influential in Jōdo Shinshū, possibly being introduced into the tradition via the figure of Anichibō, who has also been claimed as a possible author. Two surviving manuscripts exist from the 14th century, copied by Jōsen (1295–1377). By this time, the AKS was already being studied by important Jōdo Shinshū figures, like Kakunyo (1270–1351), the third head of Hongan-ji, as well as by his son, Zonkaku (存覚). The work was important to the great Shin reformer Rennyo (1415–1499), who called it a "gold mine" that "expresses the essentials of the Jōdo Shinshū tradition."

== Teaching ==
The main teaching behind the Anjin Ketsujō Shō is that, due to the boundless power of Amida's Vow, both Amida's attainment of Buddhahood and our birth in the Pure Land take place within a single, timeless moment that transcends time. This means that our future birth in Sukhavati and Buddhahood have ultimately already been accomplished, and thus no self-powered practice is necessary to attain the non-dual unity of ourselves and the Buddha. When we recite the nembutsu, we are merely expressing this non-dual truth and waking up to the liberation already granted to us by the Buddha's power. Since we are already one with the Buddha, any attempt to "attaining" or generate Buddhahood through our efforts is pointless. It is Amitabha Buddha that has already worked in the recitation of the nembutsu.

The first fascicle of the AKS emphasizes the centrality of Amida Buddha's Original Vow, which the author interprets as Amida Buddha's original intention to guarantee the birth of all sentient beings in the Pure Land. Drawing on Shandao's work, the text asserts that Amida's attainment of Buddhahood inherently confirms the assurance of all beings' eventual birth in the Pure Land. This reality is described as the timeless "simultaneity in a single thought-moment,". By reciting the nembutsu with faith, believers recognize their inseparability from the Buddha's awakening, which naturally leads to joy and reverence. The text emphasizes that true reliance on Amida's other-power, rather than self-power efforts, is the key to attaining birth. The nembutsu is understood as both an expression of awakening and a manifestation of Amida’s compassionate work.

The second fascicle introduces the concept of the "Pure Flower Assembly," a spiritual gathering of bodhisattvas symbolized by lotuses that arose at the moment of Dharmākara's Primal Vow. This symbolizes the unsullied nature of those destined for the Pure Land. The text emphasizes that even those guilty of grave offenses can be included in this assembly through Amida's compassion. Furthermore, the nembutsu is explored as the primary practice that aligns with the other-power faith. Exclusive nembutsu practice is presented as the highest path, while reciting it through self-power efforts is seen as ineffective. The text underscores that genuine faith in the Vow ensures birth in the Pure Land, even in cases of confusion or periods of spiritual negligence, as Amida’s compassion is unhindered by samsāric conditions.

== See also ==
- Tannishō

== Sources ==
- O’Neill, Alexander James (translator). The Essence of the Determination of the Settled Mind: A Translation of the Anjin Ketsujō Shō. 1st ed., Dharmakāya Books, 2025. ISBN 9781739472528.
- Dennis Hirota. "On Attaining the Settled Mind: The Condition of the Nembutsu Practitioner." In: George J. Tanabe Jr. (Hrsg.): Religions of Japan in Practice. Princeton Readings in Religions, Princeton University Press, Princeton 1999, S. 257–267, ISBN 0-691-05788-5.
