= Nishiyama Station =

Nishiyama Station (西山駅) is the name of two train stations in Japan:

- Nishiyama Station (Fukuoka), a station on the Chikuhō Electric Railroad Line
- Nishiyama Station (Niigata), a station on the Echigo Line

== See also ==
- Nishiyama (disambiguation)
