= Wester Aberchalder =

Coordinates: 57.24748°N 4.40439°W

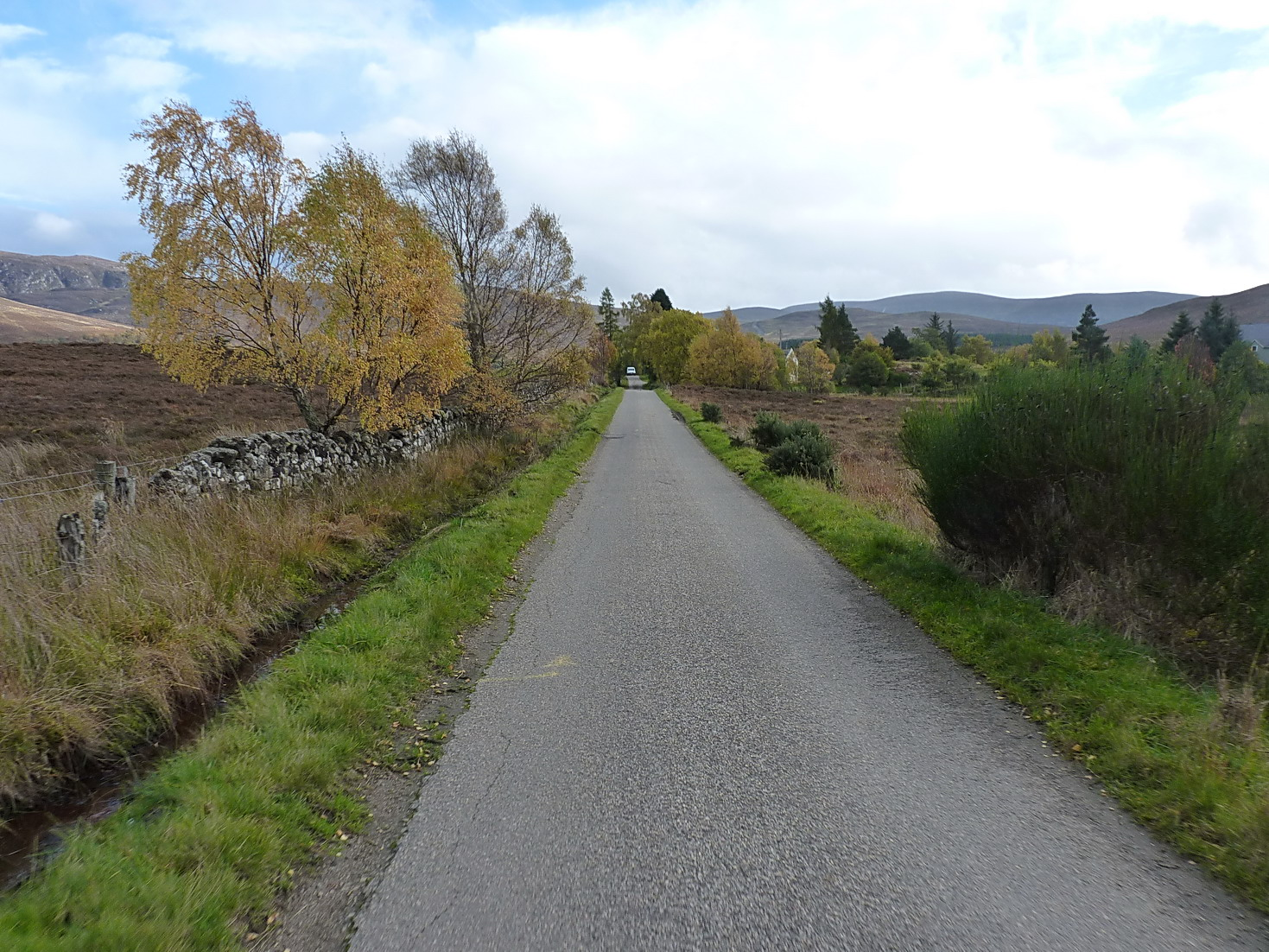

- Location within the Inverness area
- OS grid reference: NH550199
- Council area: Highland
- Country: Scotland
- Sovereign state: United Kingdom
- Post town: Gorthleck
- Postcode district: IV2 6
- Police: Scotland
- Fire: Scottish
- Ambulance: Scottish

Wester Aberchalder is a small village, situated on the south shore of Loch Mhòr, lying on the Aberchalder Burn, which flows into the loch, in Gorthleck, Inverness-shire, Scottish Highlands and is in the Scottish council area of Highland. The village of Easter Aberchalder lies approximately one mile to the 0.5 miles to the east.
