= Yashiki =

Yashiki (written: 屋敷 lit. "residence" or 家鋪)

Places:

- A prison in Japan to held kirishitan during the persecution of Catholics in 17th century Japan by the Tokugawa Shogunate.

Notable people with the surname include:

- Gota Yashiki (屋敷 豪太; born 1962), Japanese musician
- Nobuyuki Yashiki (屋敷 伸之; born 1972), Japanese shogi player
- Takaji Yashiki (家鋪 隆仁; 1949–2014), better known as Takajin, Japanese singer and television personality
