= West Heath, Hampshire =

Hamlet in Hampshire, England

Coordinates: 51.316667°N 1.15°W

West Heath
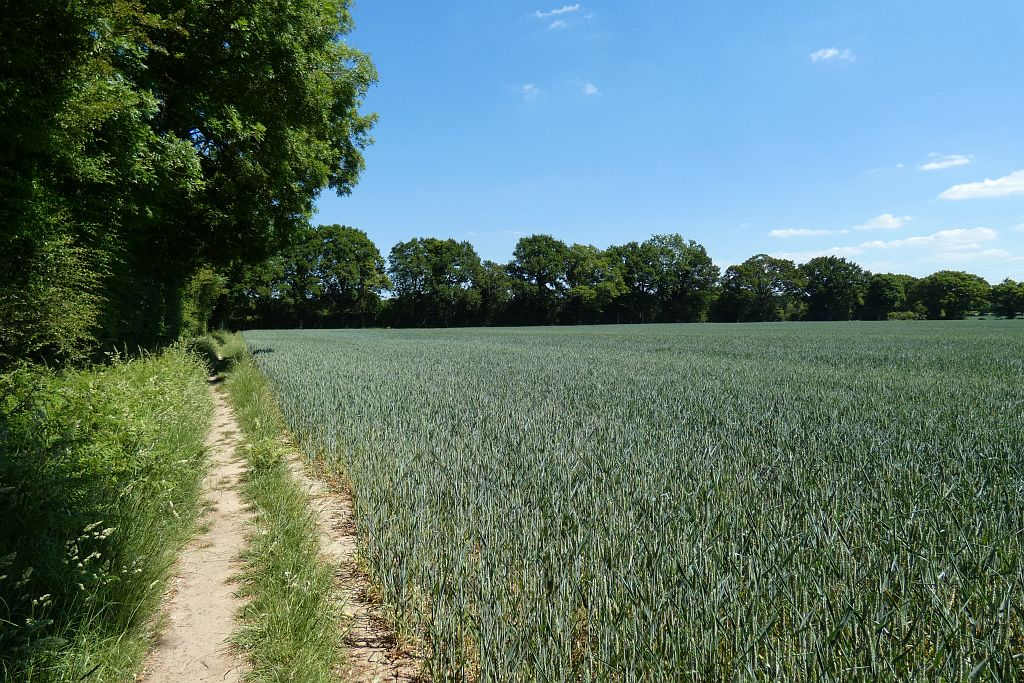
- Farmland at West Heath

- Location within Hampshire
- OS grid reference: SU593578
- District: Basingstoke and Deane
- Shire county: Hampshire
- Region: South East
- Country: England
- Sovereign state: United Kingdom
- Post town: BASINGSTOKE
- Postcode district: RG26 5
- Dialling code: 01256
- Police: Hampshire and Isle of Wight
- Fire: Hampshire and Isle of Wight
- Ambulance: South Central
- UK Parliament: Basingstoke and Deane

West Heath is a hamlet in the Basingstoke and Deane district of Hampshire, England. It is in the civil parish of Wootton St Lawrence. Its nearest town is Tadley.
