= Shōkū =

Founder of the Jōdo-shū Buddhist sect

Shōkū (証空)
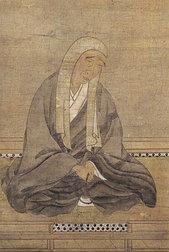
- Undated portrait of Shoku
- Title: Founder of Seizan branch of Jōdo-shū Buddhism

Personal life
- Born: November 30, 1177 Kyoto, Japan
- Died: December 24, 1247 (aged 70) Kyoto, Japan
- Other name: Seizan (西山)

Religious life
- Religion: Buddhism
- School: Jōdo-shū Buddhism, Seizan Branch

Senior posting
- Teacher: Hōnen

Zen'ebo Shōkū (証空; November 30, 1177 – December 24, 1247), sometimes called Seizan (西山), was a disciple of Hōnen, founder of the Jōdo-shū Buddhist sect. Shōkū later succeeded Jōhen, a Shingon monk with an affinity for Pure Land Buddhism, as the head Eikandō (itself a former Shingon temple). Shōkū then established a separate branch of Jōdo-shū called the Seizan-ha ("West Mountain" branch), and completed the transition of Eikandō from a Shingon temple into a Jōdo-shū one.

Shōkū’s teachings reflect a synthesis of Pure Land thought, emphasizing the inseparability of true settled faith (anjin), nembutsu, and the non-duality between sentient beings and the Dharma through the doctrine of kihō ittai (one essence, one reality).

Shōkū’s thought laid the foundation for later doctrinal developments within the Seizan branch and influenced subsequent Pure Land traditions. His ideas are particularly influential on Jōdo Shinshū, through a text called the Anjin Ketsujō Shō (Determination of the Settled Mind), which was popularized by Rennyo. This text shows the influence of Shōkū’s teaching and may have been written by him or a disciple of his.

== Biography ==
Born as the eldest son of Minamoto no Chikatsune, the governor of Kaga Province, he was later adopted by Koga Michichika, a high-ranking noble. At the age of 14, Shōkū renounced secular life and entered Hōnen's monastic community, where he dedicated himself to the study and propagation of Pure Land teachings. In one legend about his life, his mother stood before a famous bridge to have his fortune told. At that time, a monk passed by chanting the Lotus Sutra, which convinced her that he should be a priest.

It was then that Shōkū studied under Hōnen for 23 years. Shōkū played a significant role in Hōnen's circle, serving as a scribe for Hōnen’s seminal work, Senchakushū, and signing the Seven-Article Pledge as the fourth-ranked disciple. He was deeply engaged in doctrinal discussions, notably debating with Shinran on the interpretation of "losing the body in birth" (taishitsu ōjō) and "not losing the body in birth" (futaishitsu ōjō), ultimately seeking Hōnen’s judgment on the matter. Shōkū integrated elements of Tendai Buddhism into his Pure Land practice, reflecting his deep engagement with esoteric teachings. He studied under prominent Tendai monks, including Jien, and sought to synthesize Tendai doctrine with Pure Land thought. His works, such as Kangyōsho Kanganmon Gi (21 fascicles) and Ōjō Raizan Kanganmon Gi (10 fascicles), demonstrate his theological contributions to the Jōdo tradition.

During the persecutions against Hōnen’s followers in 1207 and 1227, known respectively as the Jōgen and Karoku Suppressions, Shōkū was implicated but managed to escape severe punishment through his connections within the nobility and the Tendai sect. In 1213, he moved to the Northern Peak (Kita-no-O) of Saiyama Zenpō-ji, later known as Sankō-ji, where his lineage became known as the Seizan school.

Later in life, Shōkū became a disciple of Jōhen, who had recently converted from the Shingon school to the Jōdo-shū school, subsequently converting the Eikan-dō as well. Shōkū later took over as head of this temple, and fully converted the temple into a Jōdo shū temple, and began the Seizan branch.

After Hōnen had died, Shōkū also studied Tendai and esoteric Shingon Buddhism extensively with a focus on Pure Land teachings and practices. Shōkū’s teachings were characterized by their philosophical depth and the integration of Tendai thought to reorganize and further develop Hōnen’s doctrine. His teachings gained strong support, particularly among the aristocracy. He is known for his extensive commentary on the Taima Mandala at the invitation of the head priest of Taima-dera temple.

His later years were marked by significant scholarly and devotional activities. In 1243, he and ten of his disciples transcribed major Buddhist scriptures, including the Bodhisattva Precepts Sutra, the Lotus Sutra, and the three Pure Land sutras, and enshrined them within an Amitābha statue at Dainen-ji. The following year, he cast a bronze bell at Jōkyō-ji, inscribing it with key passages from Pure Land scriptures, symbolizing his doctrinal legacy.

Shōkū died on November 26, 1247, at the age of 71 in his retreat at Kenkō-in, located in the southern part of Kyoto. His remains were later transferred to the Seizan lineage’s ancestral temple, the Kadan-no-byō at Ōjōzanmai-in. His teachings and writings continue to shape the doctrinal framework of the Seizan school of Jōdo Buddhism.

Shōkū’s disciples include Hokkō Jōon (法興浄音, 1201–1271), Enkū Ryūshin (円空立信, 1213–1284), Kankyō Shōnyū (観鏡証入, 1196–1245), and Dōkan Shōe (道観証慧, 1195–1264). These disciples formed the four branches of the Seizan school: Nishitani (西谷), Fukakusa (深草), Higashiyama (東山), and Saga (嵯峨).

== Teaching ==
The temple biography mentions that Shōkū was very intense in his study and practice, and would recite the nembutsu up to 60,000 times a day, in addition to other ascetic practices. Shōkū described his practice as shiroki no nembutsu (白木念仏, "unvarnished nembutsu"), meaning that after studying the Buddhist sutras extensively, and engaging in other Buddhist practices, one should then recite the nembutsu with total faith in Amida Buddha. This echoes the words of Hōnen where one should study Buddhist teachings, but then return to the humble self to be saved by Amida Buddha. '

=== Faith and non-duality ===
Shōkū viewed the nembutsu as an act of faith that united the believer with Amida Buddha. Central to Shōkū’s teaching was the concept of anjin (settled faith), which he considered essential for the arising of nembutsu. He argued that genuine faith requires abandoning the attitude of self-power (the idea that our efforts liberate us), in favor of totally entrusting oneself to Amida’s original vow. In this framework, the believer transitions from attempting to achieve salvation through personal effort to fully relying on Amida’s boundless compassion.

Faith is also explained through the threefold devotional heart, as taught by Shandao, which means "the most sincere heart, the deep heart, and the heart wishing for a rebirth in the Pure Land." According to Shōkū, the utmost sincerity is simplicity in abandoning self-power and truthfulness in honestly recognizing the futility of our own efforts. The deep heart is to have no doubt about the Buddha's Original Vow which has always embraced us, and that in fact, our own Buddhahood is inseparable from Amida's Buddhahood. Thus, according to Shōkū, Amida’s attainment of Buddhahood ten kalpas ago already ensured the salvation of sentient beings (as it is stated in the original vow of the Sutra of Infinite Life). Thus, just as Amida’s enlightenment is indisputable, so too is the believer’s salvation, which is intrinsically linked to it. This absence of doubt, he maintained, is synonymous with faith itself.

According to Shōkū, in the six-character phrase Namu Amida Butsu (I take refuge in Amida Buddha), the first two characters, Namu, signify the believer’s reliance on Amida, while the remaining four, Amida Butsu, represent the Buddha’s salvific power. Thus, reciting the nembutsu embodies the unity of the believer and Amida's Dharma-body. This non-duality between us and Amida was termed kihō ittai (one essence, one reality), signifies that the believer, though limited in spiritual capacity, becomes inseparably linked to the absolute truth embodied by the Buddha.

Because of this unity of beings and the Buddha, the instant we gain faith in Amida we are united with his Buddhahood forever, "embraced and never forsaken" (sesshu-fusha). At this point, whatever actions or practices we undertake are done through the Buddha's power. At this point, even the nembutsu happens spontaneously through the Buddha's power. Instead of an instrumental practice that causes birth in the Pure Land, the nembutsu becomes an expression of our non-duality with Amida. Shōkū explains this unity with the simile of how fire (Buddha) lights and consumes wood (sentient beings). The wood does not burn itself, it requires fire to burn. As Shōkū writes:

when the wood turns into embers, one cannot say whether these are fire or wood: one may call them fire just as well as wood. In this, the dry wood represents mortal beings as they are unable to do any good work by themselves, being only capable of doing evils. But when they, relying on Amida, give themselves up to him, he enters into their hearts, and his enlightenment becomes their enlightenment. To give another analogy, the moon reflects itself in water wherever there is some: the moon and the water become inseparable here. Therefore, it is said that the rebirth is attained when Amida enters into our hearts and when thus our works are his and his are ours: in the unity of Amida and ourselves, Amida realises his Buddhahood and on our side rebirth is attained.

For Shōkū, Buddhahood the essence of Amida's Vow, which in turn is the embodiment of Buddhahood universally permeating all sentient beings. Thus, there is no ultimate distinction between the Amida Buddha as the liberator and sentient beings as the subjects to be liberated. Furthermore, the Amida's Vow is the ultimate source of all teachings, including the other-power practice of nembutsu, and the self-power practices (which are only manifested to lead beings to other-power nembutsu).

Unlike interpretations that saw the nembutsu as a practice which causes birth in the Pure Land after death, Shōkū asserted that salvation occurs immediately upon the emergence of faith. He thus held that once true faith arises, on reciting the nembutsu, the distinction between the believer and Amida dissolves, making birth in the Pure Land an immediate reality (sokutoku ōjō). All actions—physical, verbal, and mental—become manifestations of nembutsu and expressions of Amida’s power rather than the efforts of the believer.

=== Unvarnished nembutsu ===
Although Shōkū rejected religious practices as a means of attaining salvation, he did not discard them altogether. He engaged in activities such as extensive nembutsu chanting, scriptural recitation, monastic discipline, and temple lectures. However, he regarded these not as self-powered efforts to achieve rebirth in the Pure Land, but as manifestations of Amida’s other-power working through him. In this way, he reconciled religious observances with the doctrine of faith-based salvation.

Shōkū is also known for his teaching of nembutsu as “unvarnished wood” (shiroki nembutsu), meaning it should be free from personal interpretations and attachments to self-power practices. People who rely on their own efforts—whether through doctrinal understanding, precepts, or meditation—add their own “color” to the nembutsu, leading either to arrogance or discouragement. However, true nembutsu, as taught in the Pure Land sutras, requires no such modifications. Shōkū, like Shandao, emphasized that sincere faith and simple calling Amida’s name are sufficient for birth in the Pure Land. Shōkū saw this as a kind of unembellished practice of recitation.

Through nembutsu, even those who have lived entirely immoral lives and are in their final moments, unable to perform good deeds or understand Buddhist teachings, can attain birth in the Pure Land by simply calling Amida’s name. Those who rely solely on the Buddha practice nembutsu entirely uncolored by self-effort, much like how a child’s hand is guided in writing by a teacher. Shōkū stressed that nembutsu alone without reliance on meditative or non-meditative practices can ensure one's birth in the Pure Land, regardless of one’s background. This teaching underscores complete reliance on Amida’s other-power (tariki) rather than self-power (jiriki), though it does not dismiss the value of nembutsu recited by those knowledgeable in Mahayana or precepts.

Shoku explains his view of the "unvarnished nembutsu" as follows:

Now if a person just says the nembutsu, he or she will attain birth [in the pure land] - no matter whether the person leads a pure or impure life, whether their karma is bad or good, whether the person is of high class or low, a scholar or a fool. And yet people committed to the self-power (jiriki) method of emancipation keep on making meditative and non-meditative practices their objective. They insist that it is useless to try to attain birth without the coloring these practices give to their nembutsu. But they are all totally out of line. That is why we teach the method of emancipation by dependence upon other power (tariki) and the complete rejection of the principles of the self-power method. Now this doesn’t mean that there’s no value in the nembutsu of people either deeply or just ordinarily knowledgeable of the Mahayana teachings, or of those who keep the precepts. It’s very important to avoid all confusion of thought here.

=== Other practices ===
Shōkū is known for his unique interpretation of "other-power cultivation" (他力修行) which harmonizes all practices, including the five main Pure Land practice and all practices of the threefold training (precepts, meditation, and wisdom), into a schema which remains focused on Amida Buddha. He argued that all virtuous practices are ultimately rooted in the merit of Amida Buddha, and thus, even practices traditionally associated with "self-power" could be understood as expressions of other-power faith if one approaches them with the right attitude. This perspective allowed Shōkū to reconcile the single-minded other-power focus of Japanese Pure Land with the broader Mahayana emphasis on ethical and meditative practices.

Regarding the five main Pure Land practices as taught by Shandao (sutra recitation, visualization of Amida, worship, nembutsu recitation and praising and making offerings), Shōkū writes that while only the nembutsu is necessary, one may still engage in the other four auxiliary practices as a way to deepen one's connection to Amida's vow and express one's gratitude to Amida Buddha.

Shōkū's also taught that even all the miscellaneous practices of the threefold training (precepts, meditation, and wisdom), which are not necessarily Pure Land focused, can still be adopted in an other-power mode. Regarding precepts, Shōkū equated them with nembutsu, asserting that taking refuge in Amida Buddha is the essence of ethical discipline. In meditation, he emphasized the achievement of samādhi (meditative absorption) through the contemplative practices described in the Contemplation Sutra, though he cautioned that vivid visions of the Buddha were not necessary for rebirth in the pure land. For wisdom, Shōkū identified it with the "three minds" (三心) of faith in other-power, particularly the mind of sincere dedication to Amida's vow.

Shōkū's teachings also critically addressed the conventional self-power practices prevalent in the Buddhist traditions of his time. He argued that practitioners who relied on their own efforts without recognizing the primacy of Amida's power for the Buddhist path were trapped in a cycle of doubt and attachment. By contrast, "other-power practice" involves recognizing one's own limitations and the futility of self-reliance, thereby opening oneself to the transformative power of Amida's vow. As such, what made one's practice self-powered or other-powered was one's relationship with Amida's power, rather than the practical details of one's specific practice.

As such, if one "recognizes one's own evil", sees self-power as futile, and turns to solely to Amida Buddha's power, all practices become effective through the infinite merit of the Buddha's original vow. Thus, Shōkū writes in his Kangyōsho Taii (観経疏大意):

The third mind of dedication and aspiration, means that all practices, all good deeds, the roots of goodness from past, present, and future, and the merits of oneself and others are all the merit of Amida Buddha. When one practices with a mind that separates these, it is difficult to achieve. But when one returns to the universal vow, they become one and the same.

Shōkū taught that even mundane and deluded desires could be transformed and added to the Pure Land path by relying on the Buddha. Shōkū thus taught that every moment of delusion and desire we experience could be transformed and used as part of the Pure Land path. For example, Shōkū writes:

when we covet material treasure, let us turn this desire into that for the seven treasures of the Pure Land. When we crave for some particular food, let us imagine all kinds of dainties procurable in the Pure Land. When we desire fine clothes, let us turn our minds to the divine raiments in the Pure Land. When we are affected with heat and cold, let our hearts dwell on the climate of that Land. When we long for a recreation, let us fancy a stroll with Buddhas and Bodhisattvas. When we hear music on earth, let us apply our minds to the celestial music in that Land. When we see flowers, let us conceive those made of the seven treasures in the Land of Amida. When we see the sun, let us figure before our eyes the moonlike face of Buddha. In this way, whenever we enjoy anything pleasurable in this life, let us practise the Nembutsu, thinking of all the enjoyments in the Pure Land; and whenever we experience anything painful, let us also practise the Nembutsu, thinking of the eight pains suffer able in the three evil paths of existence.

=== Spiritual realization ===
Shoku's view of realization holds that through practicing Buddha contemplation, one can attain a partial realization or insight in this life. According to Shōkū, the attainment of "the patience of non-arising" (mushōnin 無生忍, Skt. anutpattika-dharma-kṣānti) could be partially reached in this life, not just on birth in the pure land. He outlined two elements of the attainment of non-arising: one refers to attaining the stage of non-retrogression (a point at which one cannot regress on the bodhisattva path), and the other refers to attaining the Dharma-nature body (法性身). These are respectively assigned to the practice of the seventh contemplation of the Buddha's Lotus Throne (taught in the Contemplation Sutra), and to the period after rebirth in the Pure Land, during which one realizes the nature of Dharmakaya.

Shōkū bases his theory of realization in this life on several passages from the Contemplation Sutra, one of which states:

Seeing the supremely wondrous pleasures of that land, one's heart is filled with joy, and accordingly, at that moment, one attains the insight into non-arising.

Shōkū also relies on Shandao's commentary which states that Queen Vaidehi (the main recipient of the teaching of the Contemplation Sutra), on "seeing Amida directly" has her "heart open further" and then "realizes insight". Shōkū held that this refers to attaining the patience within the ten faiths (jūshin 十信), which are the first ten stages in the traditional East Asian schema of the bodhisattva stages. Furthermore, he held that the phrase "the mind increasingly opens and awakens to patience" in Shandao's Commentary to the Contemplation Sutra (found in the section on the visualization of the Buddha's Lotus seat) refers to Vaidehi's attainment of the first bodhisattva stage. Moreover, Shōkū also draws on the fact that the Contemplation sutra contains another passage which states that five hundred of Vaidehi's ladies-in-waiting attained the patience of non-arising after hearing the teaching on the sixteen contemplations. Shōkū interprets this passage to mean that future sentient beings, if they truly hear and internalize the teachings of the sixteen contemplations in the Contemplation Sutra, can attain the state of realization in the present life.

Regarding realizations after attaining rebirth in the pure land itself, Shōkū's position is that bodhisattvas reborn in Sukhavati reach the fifty-first stage of near-enlightenment. According to Shōkū, all beings who have attained true faith in Amida Buddha can reach this stage regardless of their position within the nine grades of birth in the Pure Land.

== Works ==
Some of Shōkū's main works include:

- Kangon Yōgishō (観門要義鈔) – Annotated Essentials of the Gate of Contemplation (43 fascicles), a commentary on Shandao's works, especially his Contemplation Sutra Commentary
- Kangyōshō Tahitsushō (観経疏他筆鈔) – Annotated Writings on the Commentary on the Contemplation Sutra (10 fascicles)
- Kangyō Hishiketsu-shū (観経秘決集) – Collection of Secret Determinations on the Contemplation Sutra (2 fascicles), a commentary on the Contemplation Sutra.
- Mandara Chūki (曼陀羅註記 in 10 fascicles), an explanation of Taima Mandala
- Senchaku Mitsuyō Ketsu (選択集密要決 in 10 fascicles) – Secret Essential Determinations of the Senchaku Collection, a commentary on the Senchakushū.
- Shijuhachigwan Yōshakushō (四十八願要釋抄 in 2 fascicles), notes on the forty-eight vows of Amida.
- Shugyō Yōketsu (修業要決 in 1 fascicle), a brief commentary on Shandao’s work.
- Kangyōsho Taii (観経疏大意 ) – General Meaning of the Commentary on the Contemplation Sutra
