= Seizan =

Buddhist sect

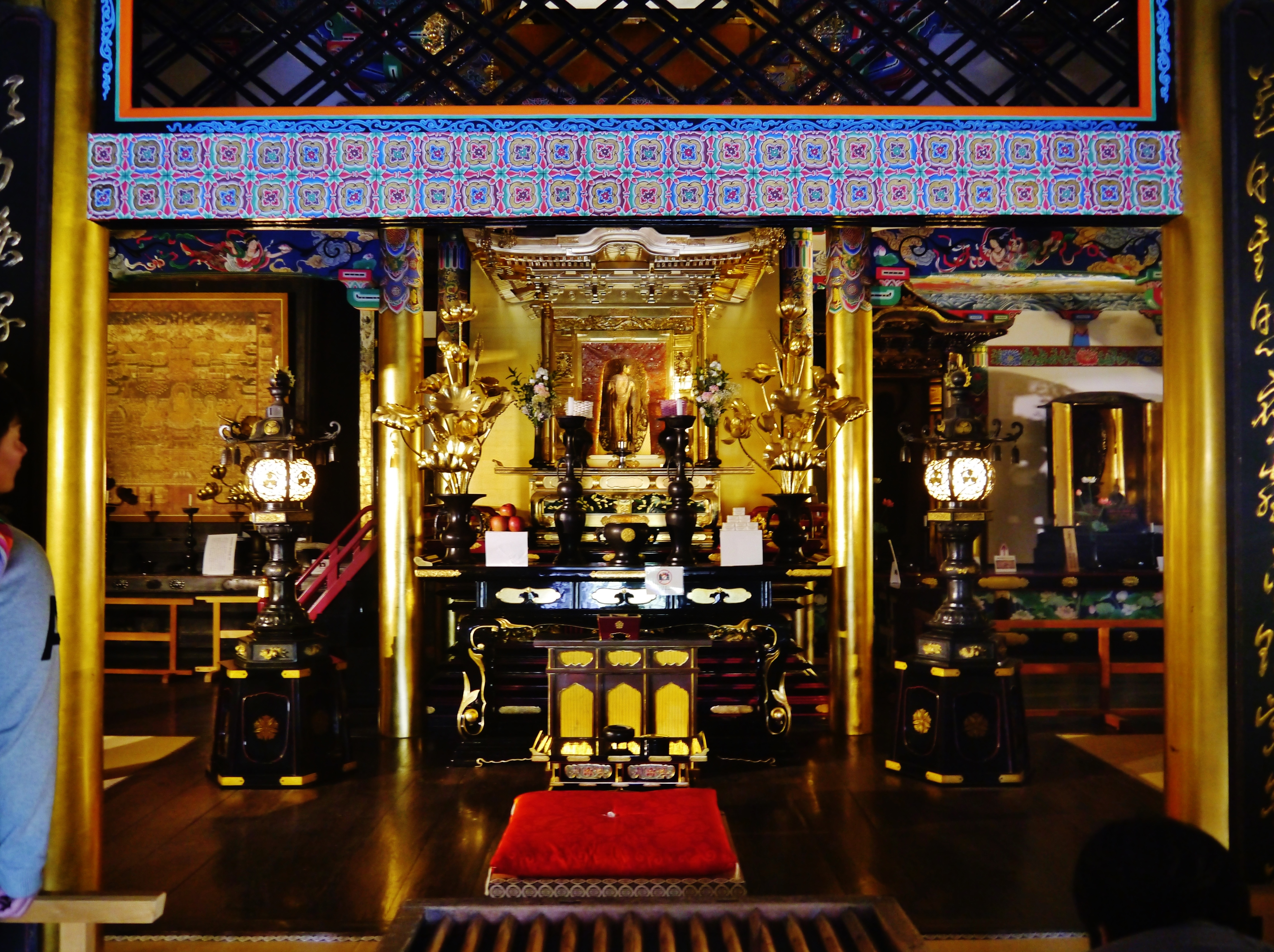
Amida Hall at Eikan-dō Zenrin-ji, with the famous "Amida looking back" (Mikaeri Amida) statue.

Seizan (西山; West Mountain) is a branch of Japanese Pure Land Buddhism (Jōdo-shū) that was founded by Hōnen's disciple, Shōkū (1177–1247), who often went by the name Seizan. The name derives from the western mountains of Kyoto where Shōkū often dwelt. Seizan Jōdo-shū emphasizes the single-minded recitation of the nembutsu (念仏, "Namu Amida Butsu") as the actualization of the non-duality of Amida Buddha and sentient beings, while also incorporating some influence of Tendai and Shingon Buddhism.

There currently three main sub-branches of the Seizan school, each with its own head temple: Seizan Jōdo-shū (Kōmyō-ji temple), Seizan Zenrin-ji-ha (Eikan-dō Zenrin-ji temple), and Seizan Fukakusa-ha (Seigan-ji temple).

Seizan teaching also influenced the Jōdo Shinshū school (through the Anjin Ketsujō Shō) and the Ji-shu sect (since Ippen studied with Seizan teachers and adopted their theory of non-duality).

== Overview ==
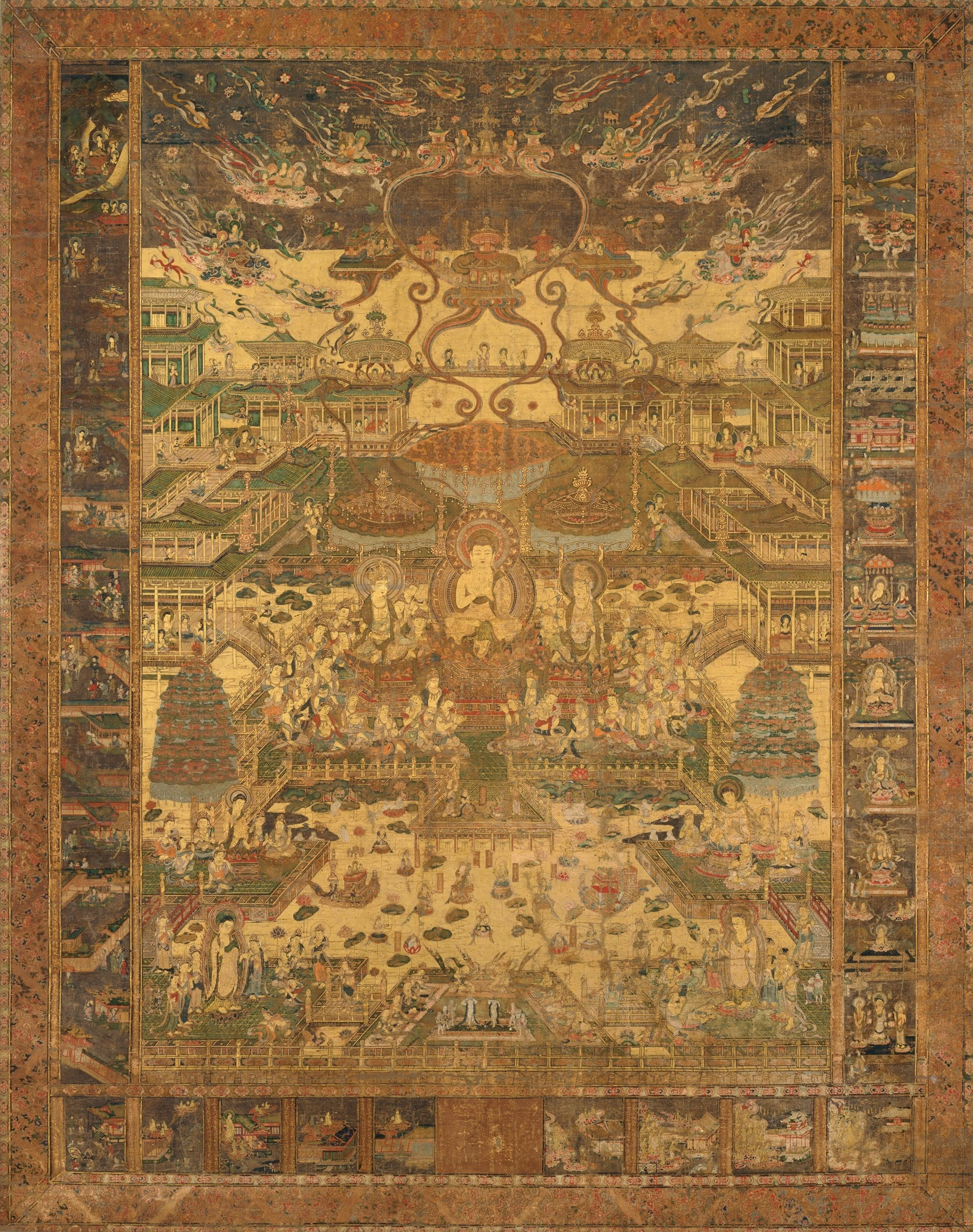
14th-century copy of the Taima Mandala. Japan, Kamakura period

The Seizan school traces its origins to Shōkū, a prominent disciple of Hōnen, who studied and systematized Pure Land doctrine of Hōnen with an emphasis on faith, other-power and the non-duality of Amida and sentient beings. Seizan Jōdo-shū was also influenced by the Tendai and Shingon traditions due to the background of its early teachers.

One of the key locations for Seizan Jōdo-shū’s development was Eikan-dō Zenrin-ji, which was originally a Shingon temple. Jōhen (静遍), one of its abbots, took an interest in Jōdo Buddhism initially as a means to criticize it. However, he later designated Hōnen as the 11th chief priest of Eikan-dō. Afterward, Shōkū became the head priest and officially converted the temple into a Jōdo institution, establishing the temple as a Seizan branch of Jōdo-shū.

Shōkū had 27 direct disciples, and the Seizan tradition eventually divided into six sub-branches, collectively known as the Seizan Six Lineages (西山六流, Seizan Rokuryū). The main Seizan branches were all centered around Kyoto, and had close connections to elite circles.

Among them, four lineages were particularly influential:

- Sagagiryū (嵯峨義) - Founded by Shōė (證慧)
- Higashiyamagiryū (東山義) - Founded by Shōnyū (證入)
- Saitanigiryū (西谷義) - Founded by Jōonbō Hōkō (浄音房法興)
- Fukakusagiryū (深草義) - Founded by Risshin (立信)

Of these, Saitanigiryū was inherited by Kōmyō-ji and Eikan-dō, while Fukakusagiryū continued at Kyōgoku Seigan-ji (京極誓願寺).

Later, two other minor lineages—Rokkakugiryū (六角義) and Honzangiryū (本山義)—emerged, but they eventually merged with other branches. By the end of the Nanbokuchō period (14th century), several Seizan sub-schools had declined or disappeared.

Today, Seizan Jōdo-shū consists of three main branches, collectively called the Seizan Three Schools (西山三派, Seizan Sanpa):

- Seizan Jōdo-shū (西山浄土宗) – Kōmyō-ji (光明寺) as its head temple. Originally called Jōdo-shū Seizan Kōmyō-ji-ha (浄土宗西山光明寺派), this sect adopted its current name in 1948.
- Seizan Zenrin-ji-ha (西山禅林寺派) – Eikan-dō Zenrin-ji (永観堂禅林寺) as its head temple
- Seizan Fukakusa-ha (西山深草派) – Seigan-ji (誓願寺) as its head temple

Seizan temples, including Kōmyō-ji and Eikan-dō, remain important historical and cultural sites for Japanese Pure Land Buddhism. Kōmyō-ji, in particular, is recognized as the site where Hōnen first chanted the nembutsu and was later cremated.

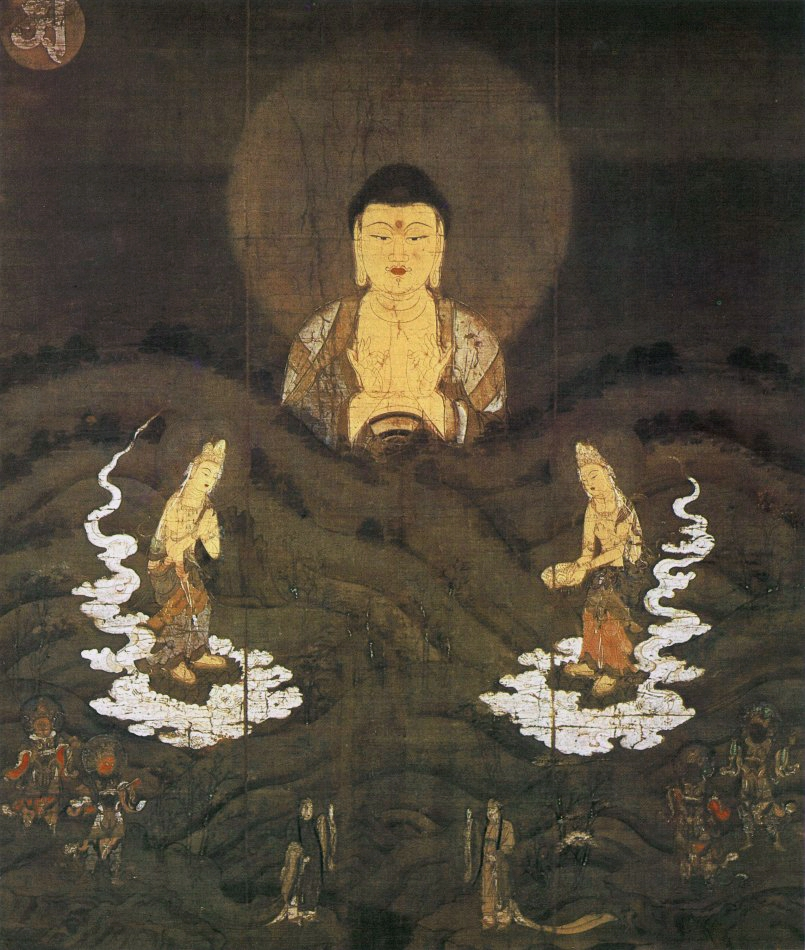
Descent of Amitabha over the Mountain or Yamagoe no Amida (山越えの阿弥陀), a cultural treasure from Eikando Temple. Note the seed syllable "a" for Amida on the upper-left.

=== Teaching ===
As a branch of Jōdo-shū, Seizan Jōdo-shū centers on devotion to Amida Buddha and the recitation of the nembutsu. However, it has some doctrinal differences from other Pure Land schools.

Shōkū maintained that salvation comes solely through Amida Buddha’s power (tariki) and not through self-effort (jiriki), yet he did not reject religious practices entirely. He engaged in nembutsu chanting, scripture recitation, and monastic discipline, viewing these not as means to attain rebirth in the Pure Land but as expressions of Amida’s working through him. His concept of “unvarnished nembutsu” (shiroki nembutsu) emphasized reciting Amida’s name without attachment to personal interpretations or additional practices, as any reliance on self-power leads to either arrogance or discouragement. Even those who have led immoral lives can attain rebirth simply by calling Amida’s name, as their nembutsu remains untainted by self-effort, like a child guided in writing. While he completely rejected self-powered methods of emancipation, he acknowledged the value of nembutsu recited by those well-versed in Mahayana teachings or precepts, urging a clear distinction between tariki and jiriki without dismissing the learned.

Thus, unlike some of Hōnen’s disciples, such as Kōsai, who rejected all practices except the nembutsu, Seizan Jōdo-shū acknowledges the merit of other Buddhist practices. However, it ranks them in a hierarchy where nembutsu is the foremost practice, similar to how the Shingon, Tendai, and Kegon traditions organize their teachings. While other practices contain some merit, they are not considered equal to even a single recitation of the nembutsu.

Seizan Buddhism also seems to incorporate techniques from the Shingon and Tendai sects including the use of mandala (such as the famous Taima Mandala), and other ascetic practices. Shōkū, its founder, was said to recite the nembutsu 60,000 times a day and would endure other ascetic practices.

=== The Anjin Ketsujō Shō ===
The Anjin Ketsujō Shō (Essence of the Determination of the Settled Mind) is a significant Pure Land Buddhist text, particularly influential in the Seizan and Jōdo Shinshū traditions of Japan. Written soon after the time of Hōnen, modern scholars believe it originated within the Seizan school, possibly authored by Shōkū (1177–1247). The text focuses on the concept of the "settled mind" (anjin), which refers to true entrusting (shinjin) in Amida Buddha, and the assurance (ketsujō) of birth in the Pure Land. By the 14th century, the text had been adopted into Jōdo Shinshū, possibly through Anichibō, and was studied by key figures like Kakunyo, Zonkaku, and later, Rennyo, who regarded it as essential to the Jōdo Shinshū tradition.

The core teaching of the Anjin Ketsujō Shō is that, due to Amida Buddha’s boundless Vow, both Amida’s attainment of Buddhahood and the practitioner's birth in the Pure Land occur simultaneously in a timeless, non-dual reality. Since this realization has already been accomplished through Amida’s power, self-powered practices are unnecessary. Instead, reciting the nembutsu serves as an expression of this truth and an awakening to the liberation already granted by Amida. Any attempt to attain Buddhahood through personal effort is seen as futile; all that is required is absolute trust in Amida Buddha through nembutsu recitation.
