= Xishan Township =

Xishan Township may refer to:

- Xishan Township, Bama County, a township in Bama Yao Autonomous County, Guangxi, China
- Xishan Township, Langzhong, a township in Langzhong, Sichuan, China
- Xishan Township, Yuexi County, a township in Yuexi County, Sichuan, China
- Xishan Township, Xifeng County, a township in Xifeng County, Guizhou, China
- Xishan Township, Eryuan County, a township in Eryuan County, Yunnan, China
- Xishan Township, Mangshi, a township in Mangshi, Yunnan, China
- Xishan Township, Huzhu County, a township in Huzhu County, Qinghai, China
- Xishan Township, Hami, a township in Hami, Xinjiang, China
