= West Hill School =

Coordinates: 53.4868°N 2.0658°W

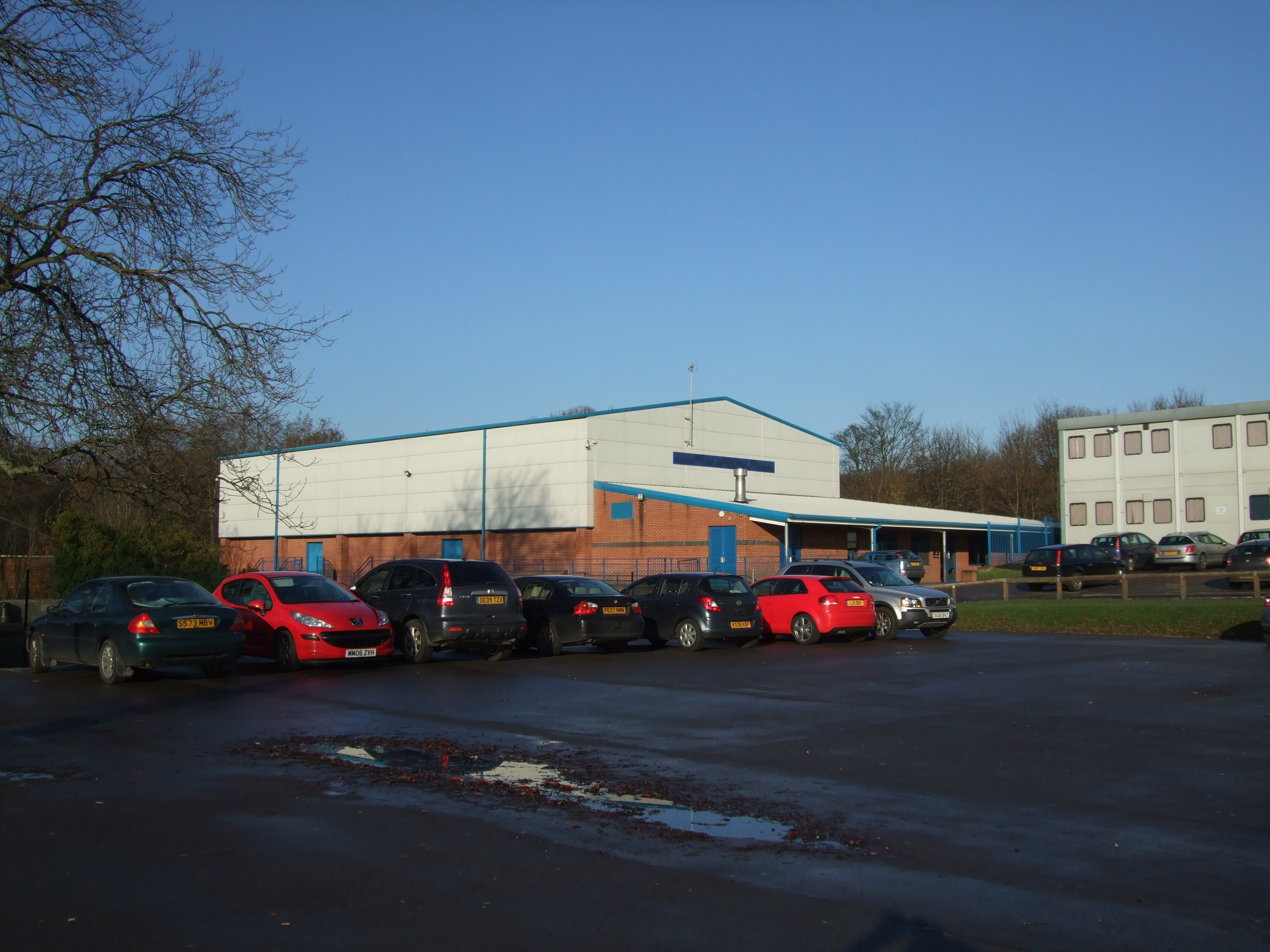
- The Sports Centre of West Hill School

Location
- Thompson Cross; Stalybridge, Greater Manchester, SK15 1LX; England

Information
- Type: Academy
- Motto: Aim High
- Established: 1927
- Department for Education URN: 137020 Tables
- Ofsted: Reports
- Head teacher: C Cronin
- Gender: Boys
- Age: 11 to 16
- Enrolment: 866
- Houses: Milton; Chaucer; Scott; Spencer
- Colour
- Website: http://www.westhillschool.co.uk/

West Hill School is an 11–16 boys secondary academy, located in Stalybridge, Greater Manchester, England.

The school was founded in 1927 as a school for only boys, the development in the Tameside borough has had multiple extensions and new buildings. included a new sports hall in 2004 (funded by the National Lottery), a new Resistant Materials/Religious education building in 2013 and a new English and Humanities block called The Hewitt Building in 2015, named in honour of Mr R.J.Hewitt, the school's former headteacher.

West Hill School is the second oldest school in the Tameside borough.

== History ==
West Hill School was formally a home. This home was owned by the Harrison family, which was headed by Thomas Harrison. Thomas had four sons and one of them was named William Harrison. In 1922, William built West Hill and his brother Abel built Highfield House. Later in 1922, West Hill was purchased by the corporation. On 24 March 1927, West Hill Council School (boys only school) was started with ten classrooms.

It became a Specialist Science College in September 2004. On 1 August 2011, West Hill School officially gained academy status.

== Former pupils ==
A notable former pupil is England U21 and Arsenal centre-back Rob Holding. His football shirt is on display in the assembly hall.

Another notable former pupil is the newly elected MP for Windsor, Jack Rankin.

== Ofsted reports ==
West Hill School has had many Ofsted ratings, across both its current academy status school and its previous state school status. Previously the school was rated inadequate and then requires improvement. The school is now classified as good, after improvements in all areas.
