= West Hill railway station =

Railway station in Kerala, India

West Hill

General information
- Location: West Hill, Kozhikode, Kerala; India
- Coordinates: 11.28585°N 75.76509°E
- System: Express train & Passenger train station
- Owner: Indian Railways
- Operator: Southern Railway zone
- Line: Shoranur–Mangalore line
- Platforms: 4
- Tracks: 4

Construction
- Structure type: At–grade
- Parking: Available

Other information
- Status: Functioning
- Station code: WH
- Zone(s): Southern Railway zone
- Division(s): Palakkad
- Fare zone: Indian Railways

History
- Opened: 1904; 122 years ago
Location
- Location within India Location within Kerala

West Hill railway station (station code: WH) is an NSG–6 category Indian railway station in Palakkad railway division of Southern Railway zone. It is a railway station in Kozhikode district, Kerala and falls under the Palakkad railway division of the Southern Railway zone, Indian Railways.
