= West Lyn, Devon =

Hamlet in Devon, England

Coordinates: 51°13′09″N 3°49′41″W

West Lyn
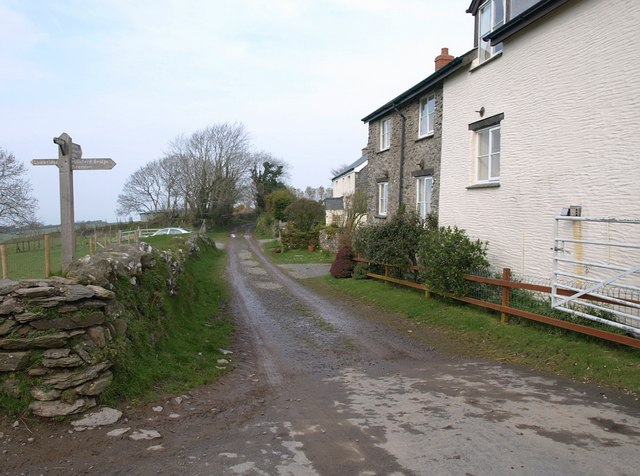

- Location within Devon
- OS grid reference: SS724482
- Civil parish: Lynton and Lynmouth
- Unitary authority: North Devon
- Ceremonial county: Devon
- Region: South West
- Country: England
- Sovereign state: United Kingdom
- Post town: LYNTON
- Postcode district: EX35
- Police: Devon and Cornwall
- Fire: Devon and Somerset
- Ambulance: South Western
- UK Parliament: North Devon

West Lyn is a hamlet in the civil parish of Lynton and Lynmouth in the North Devon district of Devon, England. Its nearest town is Lynton, which lies approximately 1 mile (1.6 km) north from the hamlet. The hamlet is within the Exmoor National Park.
