= Michitaka Nishiyama =

Japanese baseball player

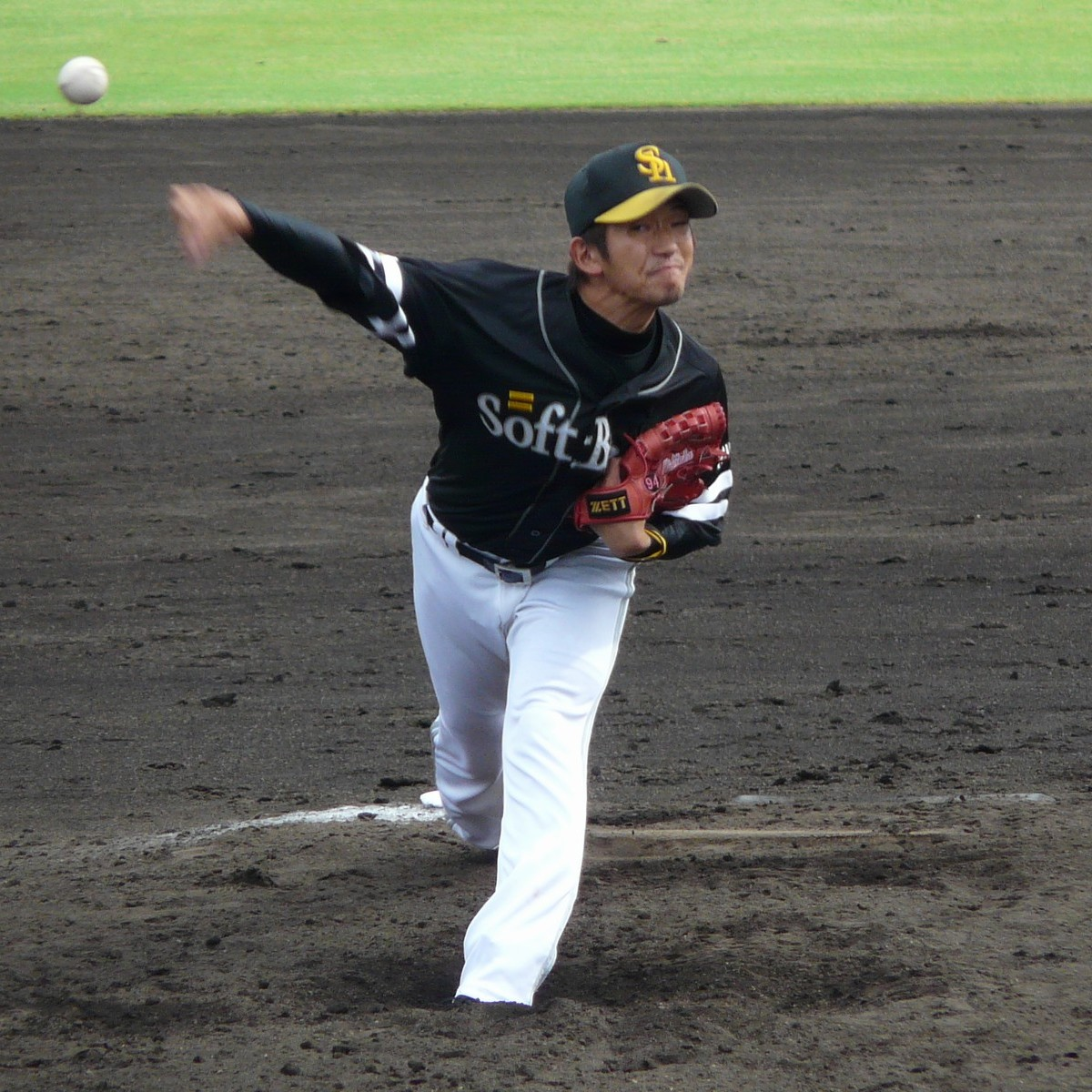
- Pitcher
- Born: January 9, 1980 (age 45); Matsuyama, Ehime Japan
- Batted: Right Threw: Right

debut
- May 28, 2006, for the Fukuoka SoftBank Hawks

Last appearance
- June 29, 2008, for the Fukuoka SoftBank Hawks

Career statistics
- Pitching record: 0-2
- ERA: 7.59
- Strikeouts: 12

Teams
- Fukuoka SoftBank Hawks (2006 – 2008)

Michitaka Nishiyama (西山 道隆, born January 9, 1980, in Matsuyama, Ehime, Japan) is a Japanese former professional baseball pitcher who played for the Fukuoka SoftBank Hawks of the Nippon Professional Baseball (NPB) from 2006 to 2008.

== Career ==
Prior to playing professionally, he attended Matsuyama Shogyo High School and then Josai University. In 2004, he played for the Winnipeg Goldeyes of the American independent Northern League in 2004, posting a 27.00 ERA in 1/3 of an inning of work. He played for the Ehime Mandarin Pirates of the Shikoku Island League in 2005 and joined the Hawks for 2006. That year, he had a 10.80 ERA in 3 1/3 innings. The next season, he was 0–2 with a 4.20 ERA in three starts and in 2008, he posted a 21.00 mark in two relief appearances. Overall, he was 0–2 with a 7.59 ERA in 7 games (4 starts) in NPB. In 21 1/3 innings, he had 12 strikeouts, 15 walks and 29 hits allowed.
