= Craig Leith (hill) =

Craig Leith, also known as West Hill, is a hill summit in the Ochil Hills on the south face of the Ochil Escarpment as part of the Ochil Fault.

== History ==
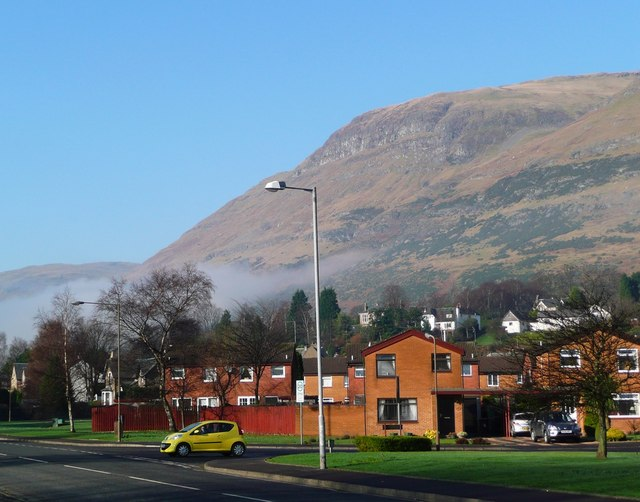
The face of Craig Leith as seen from the town of Alva

In historical literature, Craig Leith has been referred to as West Hill as far back as 1796 in the Statistical Accounts of Scotland: Alva, County of Stirling, OSA, Vol. XVIII.

The accounts written in 1796 mention that "On the brow of this [West Hill] is a very high perpendicular rock, which, for what reason is not known, has obtained the name Craig Leith." Historical accounts reference Craig Leith as being well known as a nesting place of the species Falco Peregrinus (Peregrine Falcon). There is even note of an English servant being sent from Yorkshire to the hill of Craig Leith to procure peregrine falcons by being tied to a rope and lowered onto the face of the crags by 12 people to scramble the rocks in search for the birds. This was in order to procure species for breeding due to the sport of falconry being extremely popular during the 1700s in England.

Historically, the ancient house of Alva stands at the base of Craig Leith, with this now privately owned as a residential property.

In 1759, when Craig Leith was known as West Hill, documents show it to have been rented out for sheep grazing.

== Geometry ==
The hill has an average gradient of 33% from the bottom straight up the south face to the defining grey rock crags. A Strava segment has been created straight up the face of the hill, with a personal best climb time of 18:49.

Records from 1796 quote the hills height as 1620 ft, with OS Maps in 2020 showing the hill to be 1683.07 ft.

The east face of Craig Leith slopes sharply into the Balquharn Glen. Like many of the glens in the Ochil Hills, Balquharn is of steep gradient with small amounts of woodland. Nestled into Balquharn Glen is a spectacular waterfall, running into a small reservoir.

== Summit ==
From the summit of Craig Leith one can see the Firth of Forth to the south, the Campsie Fells, Gargunnock Hills, the Glenochil Prison, the Wallace Monument, Stirling Castle, and Knockhill Race Circuit

== Fact-file ==
Name:	Craig Leith [West Hill] [Mid Cairn]
Hill number:	7134
Height:	513m / 1,683.07 ft
Parent (Ma):	Ben Cleuch
RHB Section:	26A: Central Scotland from Dumbarton to Montrose
Donald area:	Ochil Hills
County/UA:	Clackmannanshire (UA)
Catchment:	Forth
Class:	Dodd (500-599m), Donald Dewey (Tu,5,DDew)
Grid ref:	NS 87277 98780
Summit feature:	cairn
Drop:	36m
Col:	506m NS870994
OS map sheet(s):	(1:50k) 58 (1:25k) 366E
