= Western Hills High School =

Western Hills High School may refer to:

- Western Hills High School (Frankfort, Kentucky)
- Western Hills High School (Benbrook, Texas)
- Western Hills High School (Cincinnati, Ohio)
