= Kegon Engi Emaki =

- 華厳縁起 (Japanese), 華厳宗祖師絵伝 (Japanese)
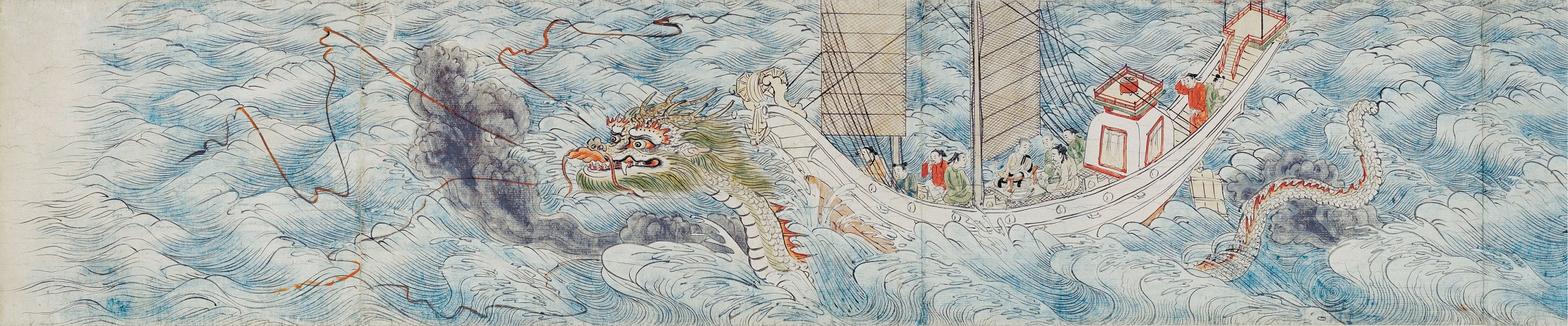
- Famous scene in which Zenmyō, transformed into a dragon, guides her beloved's ship to Korea (Gishō scroll 3)
- Artist: Uncertain
- Completion date: 13th century
- Medium: Emakimono; Paint and ink on paper handscroll
- Movement: Yamato-e
- Subject: Kegon school
- Dimensions: 31 cm × 8195 cm (12 in × 3,226 in)
- Designation: National Treasure
- Location: Kyoto National Museum; Tokyo National Museum

The Kegon Engi Emaki (華厳縁起) or Kegon-shū Sōshi Eden (華厳宗祖師絵伝) ("Illuminated scrolls from the founders of the Kegon Sect"; also translated as "Illustrated Legends of the Kegon Patriarchs", "Legends of the Kegon Sect" or "Scrolls of the Founding of the Kegon Sect") is an emakimono or emaki (painted narrative handscroll) from the beginning of the 13th century, in the Kamakura period of Japanese history (1185–1333). An illuminated manuscript, it narrates in six paper scrolls the Buddhist legend of the founding of the Kegon school in Korea, and the lives of its two founding monks Gishō and Gengyō.

== Background ==
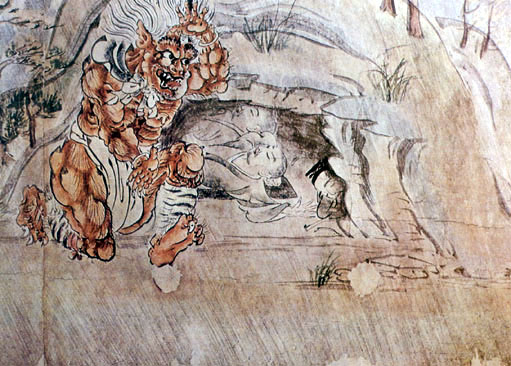
A spirit appears to Gengyō in a dream at the start of the journey (Gishō scroll 1)

An emakimono consists of one or more long rolls of paper narrating a story through yamato-e texts and paintings. The reader discovers the story by progressively unrolling the scroll with one hand while rewinding it with the other hand, from right to left (according to the then horizontal writing direction of Japanese script), so that only a portion of text or image of about 60 cm (24 in) is visible. Originating in Japan in the sixth or seventh century through trade with the Chinese Empire, emakimono art spread widely among the aristocracy in the Heian period.

Later, the advent of the Kamakura period was marked by internal strife and civil wars, which spread and favoured the rise of the warrior class (the samurai); the latter put into the spotlight a realistic, less mannered and esoteric, aristocratic culture (the Zen school also appeared at that time). In addition, from these social disturbances a fertile ground for Buddhist proselytism was born, as several new schools, mainly from the Pure Land (jōdo) tradition, appeared in Japan. Plastic iconography remained important for transmitting religious doctrines, so much so that painting played a big role, in particular the emakimono with accounts of the foundation of temples or the lives of famous monks. The old schools in vogue during the Nara period, including the Kegon school (Kegon-shū), also experienced a resurgence of interest. The Kegon Engi Emaki was created, during the golden age of emakimono (the 12th and 13th centuries), in that context.

The term "engi" (as in Kegon Engi Emaki) designates a Japanese narrative style that transcribes chronicles and legends about the founding of Buddhist temples; as for the term "eden" (part of Kegon-shū Sōshi Eden), it designates the biographies of famous monks.

Several other works, the best known of which are the Ippen Shōnin Eden (on the life of the monk Ippen, founder of the Ji-shū branch of Pure Land Buddhism) or the Hōnen Shōnin Eden (on Hōnen, the founder of Pure Land in Japan), tackle a similar theme. However, the genre of romance, important in the first part of the Kegon Engi Emaki, can also be emphasized.

== Description ==
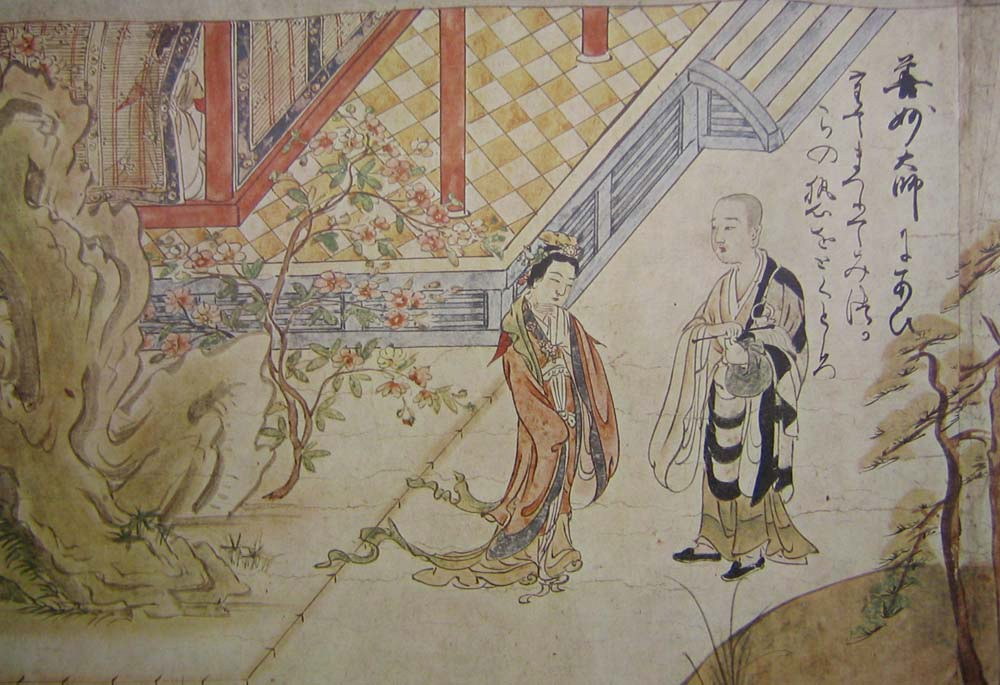
Zenmyō confesses her love to Gishō; her words are written directly in the painting (Gishō scroll 2)

The emakimono, divided into two parts, narrates the legend of the lives of two Korean Buddhist monks who established the Kegon sect in the 7th century in their country (then the kingdom of Silla, or Shiragi in Japanese) after several pilgrimages to China: Gishō (Uisang) and Gengyō (Wonhyo). The legend is drawn from the Song Gaoseng Zhuan (宋高僧伝, "Biographies of Eminent Monks Compiled during the Song"), a Chinese hagiographic compilation completed by the monk Zanning in 988. Today, the work consists of six paper scrolls, approximately 31 cm (12 in) high and about 81.95 m (268.9 ft) in total length. Four are dedicated to Gishō and two to Gengyō.

Gishō and Gengyō are two humble monks who plan to go to China to complete their learning of Buddhism. However, and as depicted in the first scroll, Gengyō gives up from the start, convinced in a dream that he must seek salvation in himself, and the two friends separate. The following three scrolls are dedicated to the legend of Gishō and Zenmyō (Shan-miao), a young Chinese girl who falls in love with him while he is on his pilgrimage to China. Gishō converts Zenmyō to Buddhism, then begins his return to his own country, to the great despair of the young girl. Zenmyō, rushing to the port, arrives too late to offer him a farewell gift, and his boat disappears over the horizon; in despair, she throws the offering into the water which then follows the boat carrying her beloved. Struck by this miracle, she throws herself into the water, swearing to protect her beloved forever, and transforms into a dragon to carry Gishō's boat on her back for the rest of the journey to Korea. There the boat turns into a mountain on which a temple is erected and Zenmyō has since been revered as the patron goddess of the Kegon sect. This dramatic story is famous in Japan and several collections of legends relate it.

The other scrolls are dedicated to Gengyō and therefore take place in Korea (the kingdom of Silla), although the separation of Gishō and Gengyō from each other is also related at the beginning. The artist tells in particular how Gengyō obtains the Vajrasamddhi (Kongō sanmai kyō) sutra from the king of the seas in order to save the seriously ill queen.

Several specialists have stressed the importance of the didactic aspect of the scroll: the teaching of the legend of the founding of the temple should remain central in the analysis of the content. Indeed, the separate accounts of the lives of the two monks illustrate in a simple way the ways of enlightenment advocated by the Kegon school: in the case of Gengyō, the dream that initiates the search for the purity of the spirit by removing it from earthly constraints, and in the case of Gishō the pilgrimage for learning the dharma. These simple answers reflect the new thoughts of society in the Kamakura period.

== Dating, author and sponsor ==
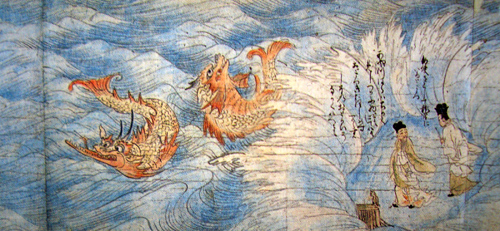
Messenger of the Kingdom of Silla in search of the King of the Seas (Gengyō scroll 2)

The paintings in the Kegon Engi Emaki were done at the Kōzan-ji temple not far from Kyoto, supposedly under the aegis of Myōe (also known as Kōben), a monk who had long studied Kegon Buddhism (at the Tōdai-ji of Nara, centre of the school in Japan) before rehabilitating the Kōzan-ji temple. If that hypothesis as to patronage is accurate, Myōe would also have been the author of the calligraphy texts in the emakimono, drawing inspiration from older Chinese stories. KL Brock suggests, however, that the Gishō scrolls may have been commissioned by Lady Sanmi, a noblewoman then close to the Kōzan-ji, and the Gengyō scrolls by her friends (but with Myōe as the main supervisor).

Although the date of creation and the author remain subject to interpretation, it seems clear that the scrolls approach a pictorial style characteristic of Kamakura art, marked by a certain realism and a proximity to humanity. While legend may have attributed the work in the past to Fujiwara no Nobuzane, it is much more likely that the author, or one of the authors, was Myōe's favorite painter, Enichibō Jōnin, also known for his murals; for Mason and Dinwiddie, Jōnin's style is especially evident in the Gengyō portion.

Comparative and historical studies have enabled KL Brock to put forward two possible dates of creation of the work: between 1218 and 1223 for the Gishō scrolls, and in the 1220s or 1230 for the Gengyō scrolls.

== Style and composition ==
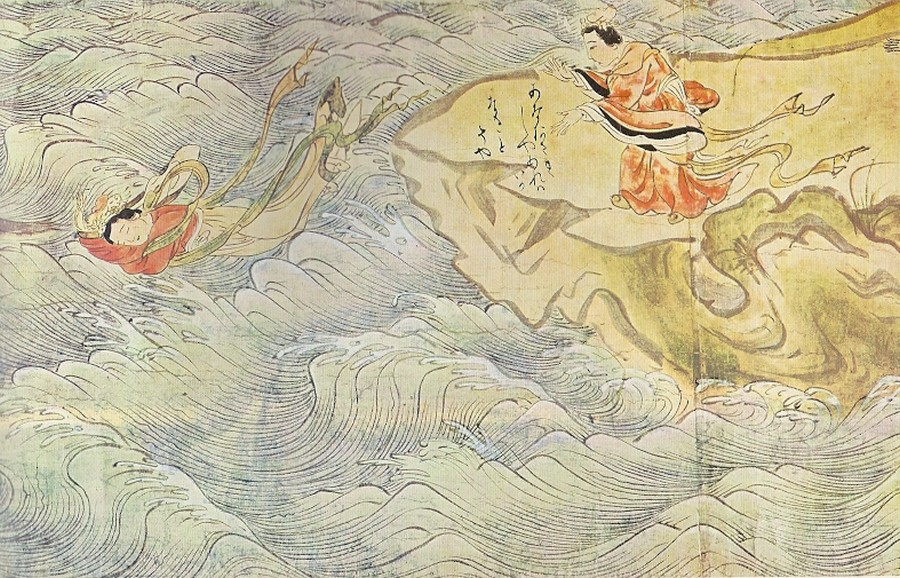
Zenmyō throws herself into the sea. The fine ripples, the rougher lines of the rocks and the pastel colors are characteristic of this work (Gishō scroll 3)

The Kegon Engi Emaki is an example of the Yamato-e style, and demonstrates the evolution of painting in the Kamakura period. Indeed, the Kamakura samurai valued more realistic and dynamic narratives (historical and religious). However, scholars assume that the work shows the first influences of Chinese Song painting in Japan (characterized by the wash technique), through the fine India ink lines and the pale colour which reveals the movements of the brush. This style of painting gives the whole emakimono a light and airy tone; it seems clear that Myōe, a scholar of Chinese spirituality, had brought in a large number of contemporary works from the mainland which probably inspired the studio of monk-painters associated with the temple.

Another, more didactic, work on the teachings of the sect (including the Kegon sutra, known as Kegonkyō in Japanese, and Avatamsaka Sutra in Sanskrit), is the Kegon Gojūgosho Emaki (13th century), similarly influenced by the Song school.

Several of the scenes in the Kegon Engi Emaki are among the classics of emakimono art: particularly that in which Zenmyō is transformed into a dragon carrying Gishō's boat on her back, the narrative summit of the third Gishō scroll. The treatment of the water, depicted as fine wavelets in ink enhanced with light blue, the fiercer colours of the dragon and the frail human beings give the whole a "remarkable sense of drama".

The composition of the work follows most of the canons of the emakimono of the day, with long sections of continuous paintings contextualised by short sections of calligraphic text. The transitions between scenes in the paintings appear not very marked and convey an impression of movement, fluidity, as the reader unfolds the emakimono. In the third scroll, a succession of scenes alternately showing Zenmyō and the ship moving away creates a cinematic narrative rhythm. As for the texts, they are very brief and indicate the words or actions of the characters; their purpose could have been to be read aloud during sessions of explanation of the scrolls to the faithful. Still unusual at the time, the characters' lyrics were sometimes calligraphed just above them, very loosely and in Japanese characters (kana). Art historians have traditionally attributed the texts to Myōe himself, although disputes have since arisen, notably in relation to the Gengyō portion.

== Historiographical value ==
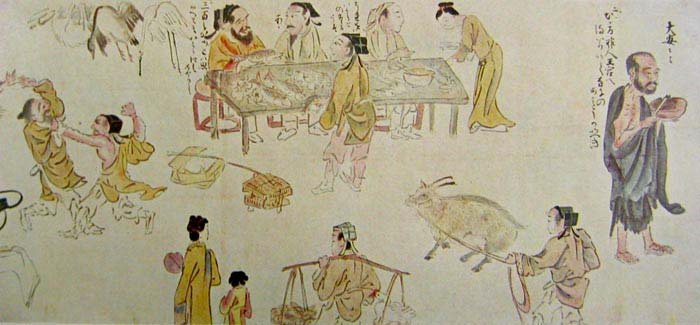
Popular life scene in Korea, in a more naive style (Gengyō scroll 2)

As an everyday narrative art, emakimono usually provide a great deal of information on the life and history of medieval Japan. Eleven red seals were affixed at various points on the scrolls to guard against loss or vandalism, and the work is known to have undergone at least three restorations between 1570 and the early modern era. However, this work differs from others in that it is set in Korea and China, and instead depicts the clothing and architecture of the Tang dynasty. Through its treatment of its religious message and its style, it also offers a special insight into the society and culture of the Kamakura period.

Some historians also the link the work with the Jōkyū War (1221), during which Myōe protected ladies of the court; the legend of Zenmyō could have been a springboard to convert them to Kegon Buddhism by providing them with a model of a virtuous woman. In 1223, Myōe erected Zenmyō-ji, a temple in her honour near Kyoto.

== Provenance ==
Nowadays, the emakimono is listed in the Register of National Treasures of Japan and is exhibited at the National Museums in Kyoto (the Gishō portion) and Tokyo (the Gengyō portion), after being stored for a long time by the Kōzan-ji; several scenes remain among the most representative of this art. However, the work has survived in a fragmentary way and some sections are missing; the reconstruction of the original scrolls has given rise to numerous studies, the most important of which is that of KL Brock in 1984.

== See also ==
- List of National Treasures of Japan (paintings)
- National Treasure (Japan)
