= Kankikō-ji =

Buddhist temple in Kyoto, Japan

Coordinates: 34.9662°N 135.8227°E

- 歓喜光寺
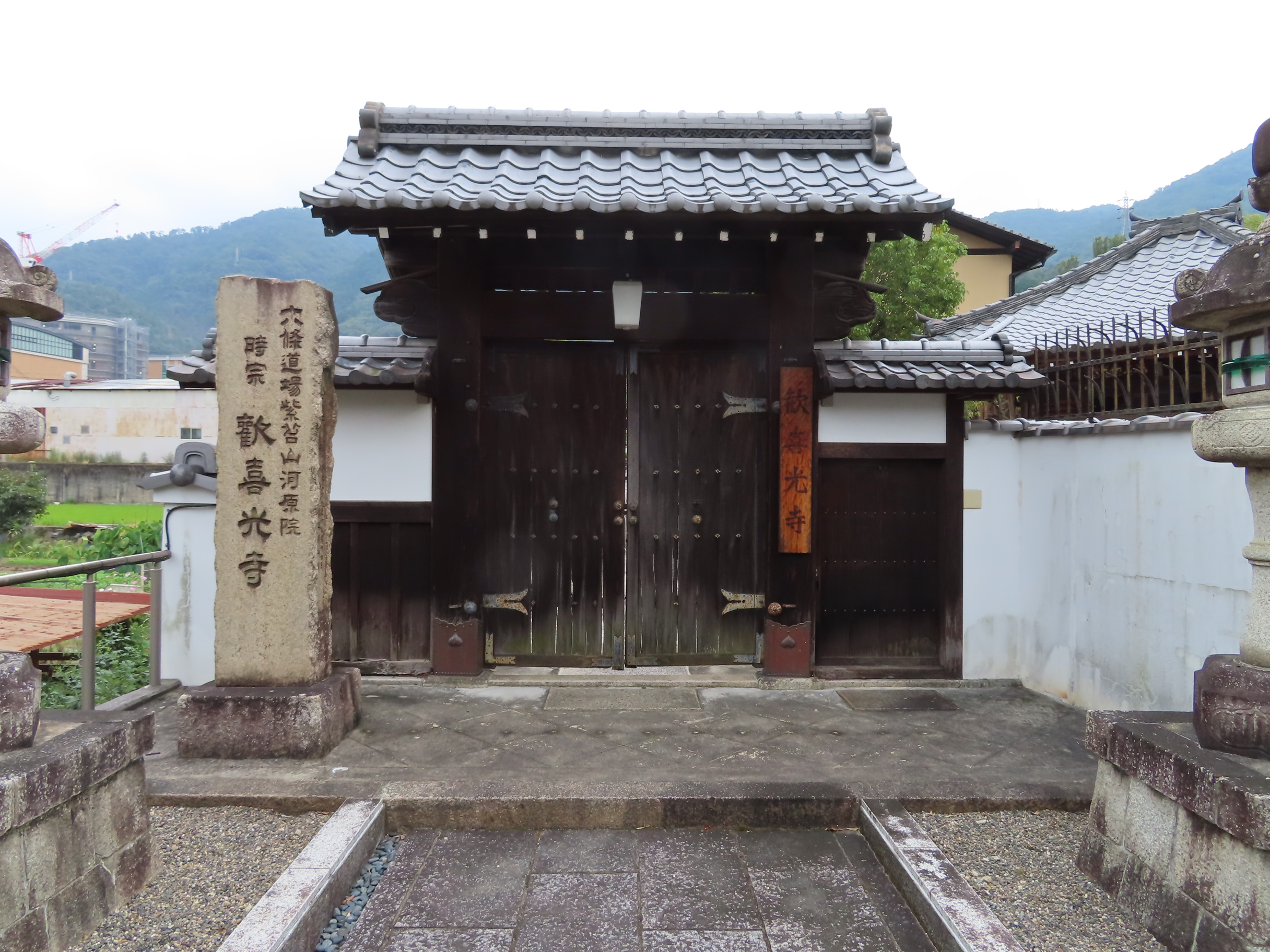

Religion
- Affiliation: Ji-shū Buddhism
- Deity: Amida Nyorai

Location
- Location: 10 Ōyake Okuyamada, Yamashina-ku, Kyoto
- Country: Japan
- Interactive map of Kankikō-ji

Architecture
- Founder: Shōkai
- Completed: 1291 (Shōō 4)

Kankikō-ji (歓喜光寺) is a Buddhist temple affiliated with Ji-shū, located in Yamashina-ku, Kyoto, Japan.

== History ==
Originally called Zendo-ji, Kankikō-ji was founded in 1291 at Yawata, Kyoto, by Shōkai (聖戒), a close relative and disciple of Ippen. According to legend, an oracle Ippen received at Iwashimizu Hachimangū shrine prompted the construction. With support from Grand Chancellor Kujō Tadanori, Kankikō-ji moved to Rokujo Kawara, Kyoto, in 1299, where it absorbed Kanki-ji, a nearby temple that relocated there in 1003. The merged temple kept Kanki-ji's tutelary shrine, a Tenmangū (later the Nishiki Tenmangū). The temple was renamed Kankikō-ji, also known as the "Rokujō Dōjō" for its location.

After the Ōnin War the temple moved to Takatsuji Karasuma in 1552 due to disrepair and then to Shijō Kyōgoku in 1587 by Toyotomi Hideyoshi. In 1907, due to Shinbutsu bunri, the temple merged with Hōkoku-ji in Higashiyama and moved to Yugyōmae-chō, Higashiyama. The Tenmangū remained at Shijō Kyōgoku, where it is known as the Nishiki Tenmangū today.

The temple moved to its current location on May 1975. The main hall and the Jizo hall were both dismantled and moved.

During its history, the temple suffered several fires and was completely moved on several occasions: notably between 1573 and 1592, in 1889, and finally in 1907.

== Layout ==
In addition to the main hall dedicated to Amida, Kankikō-ji includes several secondary temples including one dedicated to Jizō Bosatsu.

== Treasures ==
Kankikō-ji is best known for holding the original Illustrated Biography of the Itinerant Monk Ippen (National Treasure) since 1299, which is both the oldest surviving document on Ippen's life and the founding of Ji shū and a major work of art among Kamakura period emakimono. The temple is still the legal owner, but for preservation reasons the work is stored at the Kyoto and Nara National Museums.
