= Higashiyama =

Higashiyama may refer to multiple things associated with Japan, including:

- Higashiyama (surname), a Japanese surname
- Higashiyama culture, an aesthetic and architectural school from the Muromachi period
- Higashiyama (Meguro), a district in Tokyo
- Higashiyama Line, a subway line in Nagoya
- Higashiyama, Iwate, a former town in Iwata Prefecture
- Higashiyama-ku, Kyoto, a ward of the city of Kyoto
- Emperor Higashiyama (1675–1710), Emperor of Japan from 1687 to 1709
- Kobeni Higashiyama (東山 コベニ), a fictional character in the Chainsaw Man manga series

== See also ==
- Higashiyama Station (disambiguation)
