= Shōkai =

Shōkai (聖戒) (1261 - March 22, 1323) was a Buddhist monk of the Ji-shū school, disciple and close relative (younger brother or nephew) of Ippen, the first patriarch of Ji shū. He was also considered the founder of the Rokujō-ha (六条派) branch of the school.

After Ippen's death in 1289, he founded the Kankikō-ji temple in 1291, and most importantly wrote the text of the Illustrated Biography of the Itinerant Monk Ippen (Ippen hijiri-e). This is the oldest biography of the patriarch known today, so it has a very strong historiographical value.
