= Hōgon-ji (Matsuyama) =

Coordinates: 33°51′6.2″N 132°47′23.1″E

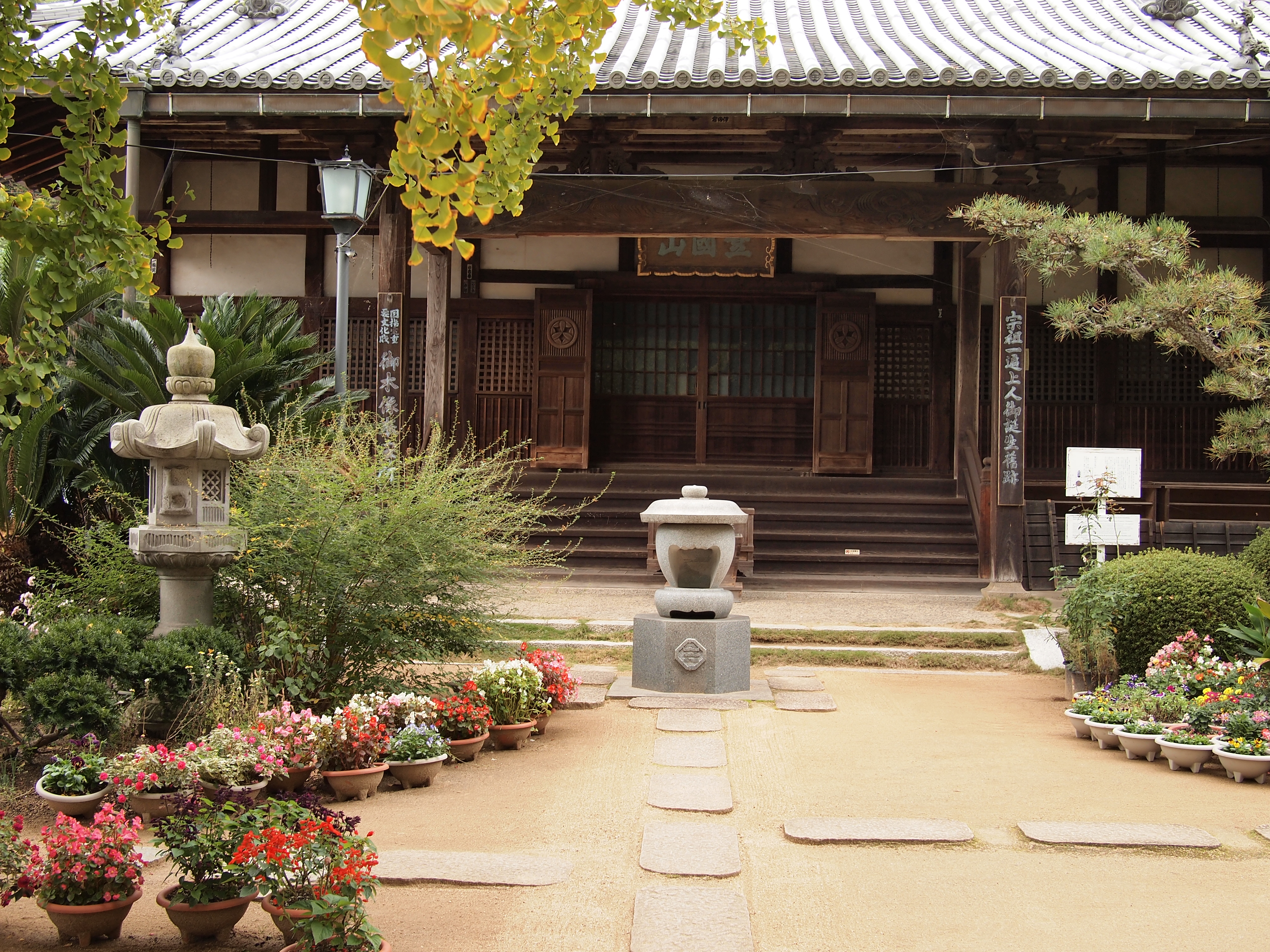
- Former Hōgon-ji main hall, 2011

Religion
- Affiliation: Ji-shū
- Deity: Amida Buddha

Location
- Location: 5-4 Dogo Yuzukicho, Matsuyama, 790-0837, Japan
- Country: Japan
- Interactive map of Hōgon-ji

Architecture
- Completed: 668

Hōgon-ji (宝厳寺) is a Buddhist temple of the Ji sect in Matsuyama, Ehime, Japan. It is famed as the birthplace of the Buddhist sage Ippen, who founded the Ji (time) sect as an offshoot of the Jōdo (Pure Land Buddhism) sect in 1276.

== History ==
According to temple records, the temple was founded in 668 by an ancestor of the Kōno clan at the behest of the abdicated Empress Saimei.

Ippen was born at the temple in what was then Iyo province in 1239. As a child he was known as Shōjomaru. In the year 1248, his mother died, and he became a monk with the name Zuien. In 1251 he left Iyo to study under Shōdatsu in Dazaifu. He returned to Iyo in 1263 at the time of his father's death, and married. In 1271, he vowed to give up his domestic life. On a visit to Kumano Shrine in 1274, Ippen experienced a revelation and "spent the remaining sixteen years of his life in constant travel throughout Japan." "The term ippen 一遍 is a common word meaning 'once,' but its second element (-pen, hen) also has the meaning of 'everywhere' or 'all pervading.'"

In 1292, three years after Ippen's death, Hōgon-ji was rededicated as a temple of the Ji sect.

On August 10, 2013, the main temple building and priest's quarters were destroyed by fire.

== Buildings and grounds ==
Besides the main hall, the temple grounds included a rock garden and several kuhi (haiku stones) and other stone monuments.

The kuhi include a haiku by Matsuyama poet Masaoka Shiki:

色里や十歩はなれて秋の風（正岡子規）

irozato ya jippa hanarete aki no kaze

red-light district
only ten steps away
autumn wind

Other kuhi feature haiku by Mokichi Saitō and Kawada Jun.

== Treasures ==
The temple's most noted treasure, a 114 centimeter high Wooden Representation of the Standing Saint Ippen (木造一遍上人立像) (mid Muromachi Period) (Important Cultural Property), dating from mid–Muromachi period (14th–16th centuries) was reportedly lost in the fire on August 10, 2013.
