= Higashiyama Station =

Higashiyama Station may refer to:

- Higashiyama Station (Kyoto), a subway station on the Karasuma Line
- Higashiyama Station (Hokkaidō), a railway station on the Hakodate Main Line
- Higashiyama Station (Nara), a railway station on the Kintetsu Ikoma Line
