= Nishiki Tenmangū =

Shrine in Kyoto, Japan

- 錦天満宮
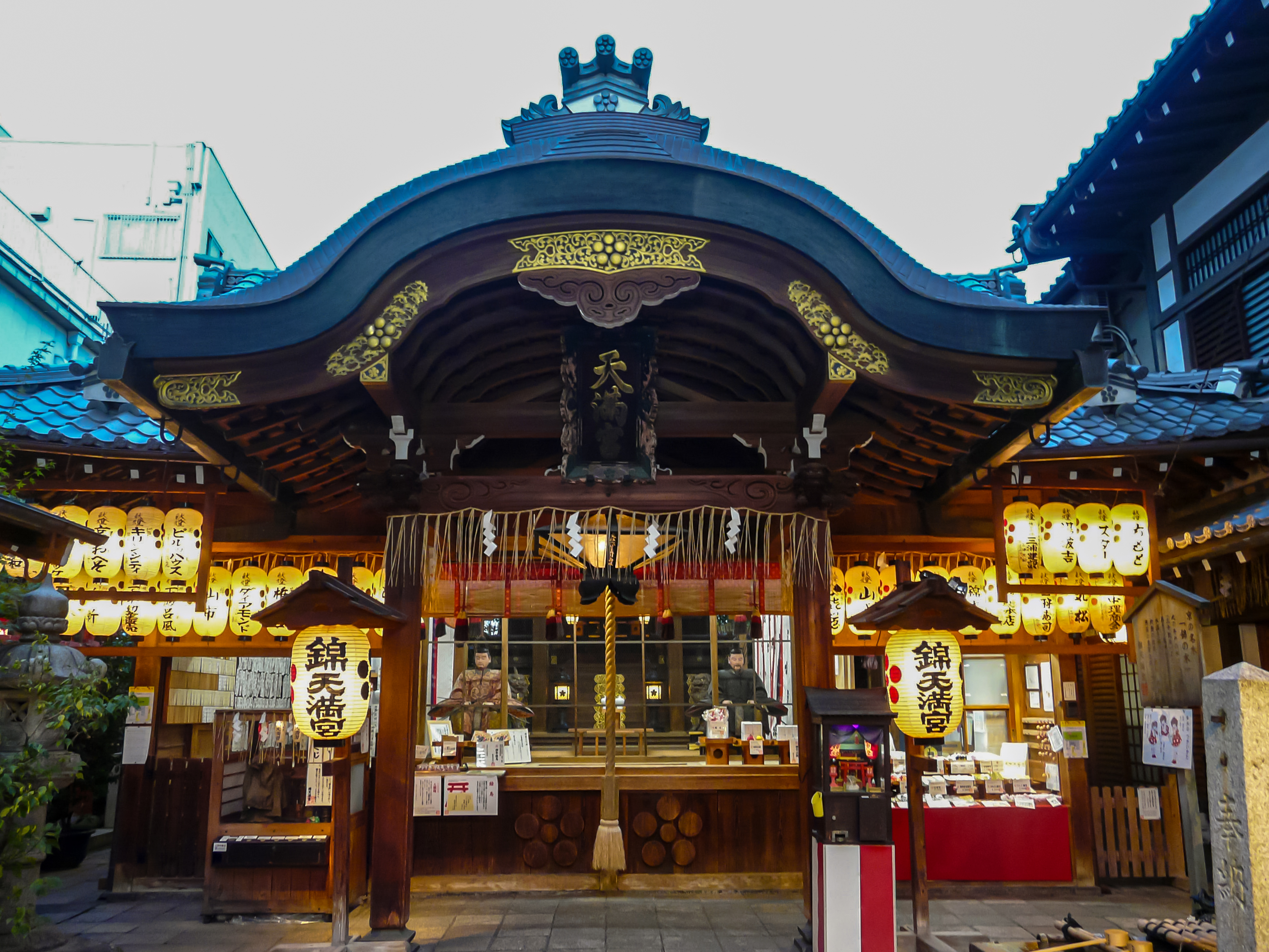

Religion
- Affiliation: Shinto
- Deity: Sugawara no Michizane

Location
- Interactive map of Nishiki Tenmangū
- Coordinates: 35°00′18″N 135°46′03″E

Nishiki Tenmangū (Japanese: 錦天満宮) is a Shinto shrine located in the Nakagyō-ku district of Kyoto, Japan.

== History ==
In the year 1003 the shrine was established in the former residence of Sugawara no Koreyoshi, the father of Sugawara no Michizane (a scholar and a politician of the Heian period known as "the God of learning"). The shrine was moved to its current location in 1587 during the Azuchi-Momoyama period during the reconstruction of Kyoto by Toyotomi Hideyoshi.
