= Ippen Shōnin Eden =

- 一遍上人絵伝 (Japanese)
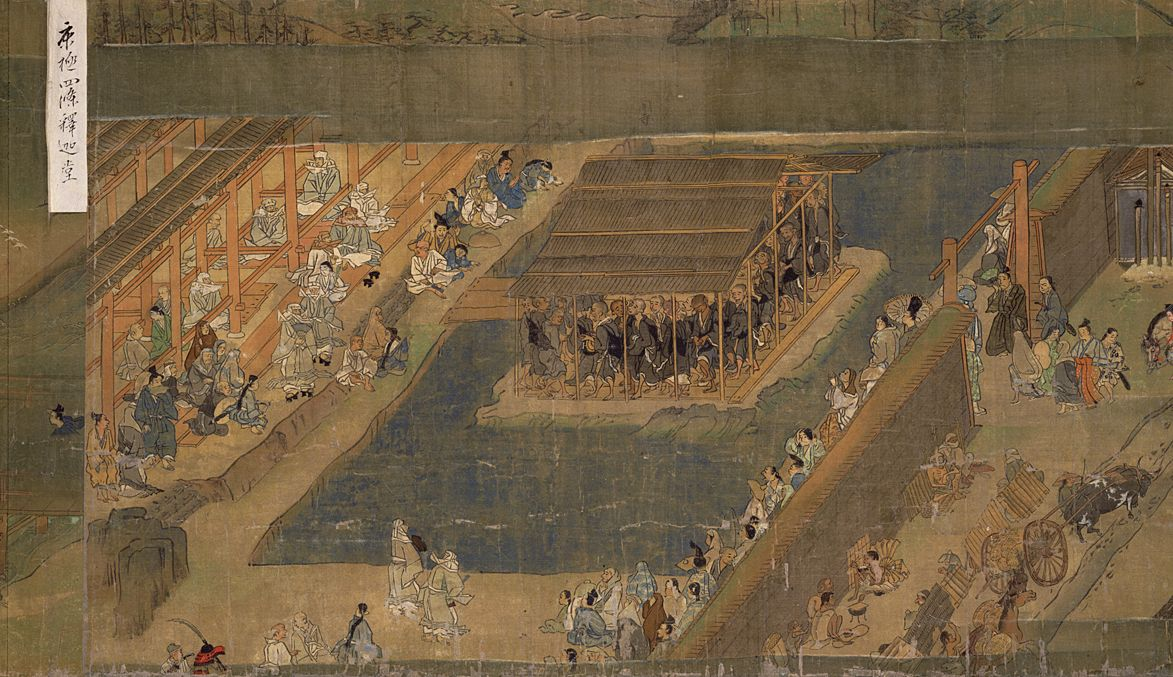
- Ippen performs the nenbutsu dance (odori nenbutsu) at Sekidera in Ōtsu, in front of wealthy city dwellers (left), and peasants and beggars (right). The composition, resting on long parallel diagonals, is typical of the perspectives in emakimono. (Scroll VII, Section 1)
- Artist: En'i
- Completion date: 1299
- Medium: Emakimono; Paint and ink on silk handscroll
- Movement: Yamato-e
- Subject: Ippen
- Designation: National Treasure
- Location: Nara National Museum; Kyoto National Museum; Tokyo National Museum
- Owner: Kankikō-ji

The Ippen Shōnin Eden (一遍 上人 絵 伝; "Illustrated Biography of the itinerant monk Ippen") is a group of emakimono or emaki (painted narrative handscrolls) from the Kamakura period of Japanese history (1185–1333). A set of illuminated manuscripts, the group describes the life of Ippen (1234–1289), a Buddhist monk who founded the Ji-shū (時宗; "Time sect") branch of Pure Land Buddhism.

Amongst the various emakimono bearing this title, the original version from 1299, named Ippen Hijiri-e (一遍 聖 絵; "Paintings from the life of the holy man Ippen"), is the best known and most famous. A second version, made in a more accessible style in the 14th century, and named Yugyō Shonin Engi-e (遊行上人縁起絵; "The Pictorial Origin Story of the Itinerant Saint"), also recounts the biography of the monk. As many copies of these two original emakimono were subsequently produced, the whole group is often referred to under the term Ippen Shōnin Eden.

The Ippen Hijiri-e, the original version created by Shōkai (聖 戒) and painted by En'i, consists of twelve rolls of silk, a very expensive material, with alternating calligraphy texts and paintings. The pictorial style and the composition of the illustrations are unheard of in the art of emakimono, drawing inspiration both from Japanese yamato-e (the traditional style of the Imperial Court) and from the Chinese landscape in the wash technique of the Song dynasty and in line with the realistic tendencies in the Japanese art of the Kamakura period.

The Yugyō Shonin Engi-e, completed between 1303 and 1307 under the leadership of Sōshun in ten rolls of paper, covers the biographies of Ippen and especially of his successor Taa. Less refined, it has a proselytising vocation and aims to establish Taa's legitimacy as co-founder of the school. This version, now destroyed, has reached us through its various copies.

== Background ==
=== Emakimono arts ===
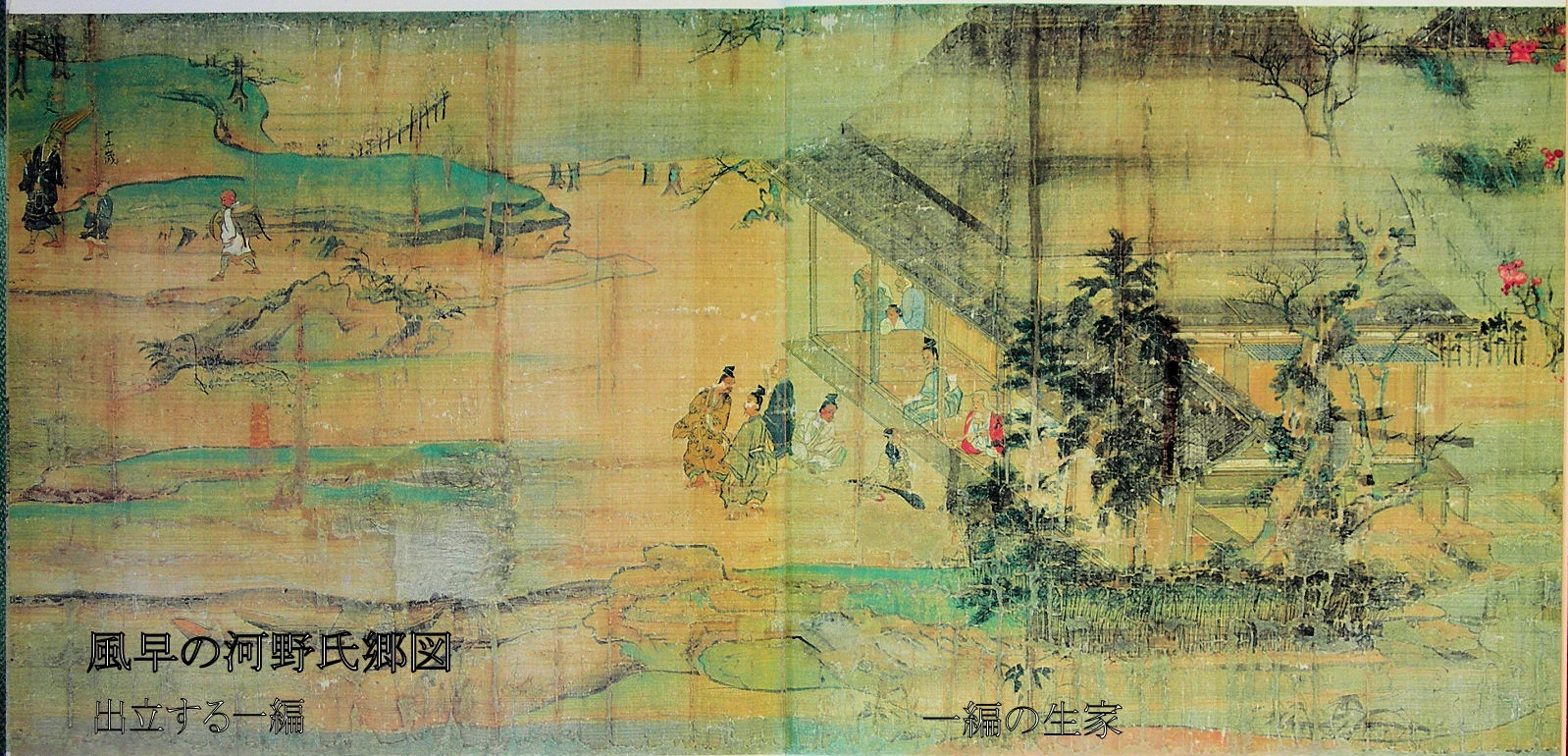
Ippen left home at thirteen to begin learning Buddhism (Scroll I, Section 1)

Originating in Japan in the sixth or seventh century through trade with the Chinese Empire, emakimono art spread widely among the aristocracy in the Heian period. An emakimono consists of one or more long rolls of paper narrating a story through yamato-e texts and paintings. The reader discovers the story by progressively unrolling the scroll with one hand while rewinding it with the other hand, from right to left (according to the then horizontal writing direction of Japanese script), so that only a portion of text or image of about 60 cm (24 in) is visible. The narrative assumes a series of scenes, the rhythm, composition and transitions of which are entirely the artist's sensitivity and technique. The themes of the stories were very varied: illustrations of novels, historical chronicles, religious texts, biographies of famous people, humorous or fantastic anecdotes, etc.

The Kamakura period (12th–14th century), which followed a period of unrest and civil war, was marked by the arrival in power of the warrior class (the samurai). This politically and socially unstable period provided fertile ground for Buddhism to proselytize, whether through the depiction of the sutras, or by illustrated accounts of the lives of illustrious monks. Under the impetus of the new warrior class in power and the new Buddhist sects, artistic production was very sustained and the themes and techniques were even more varied than before, signalling the "golden age" of emakimono (the 12th and 13th centuries).

The Ippen Shōnin Eden fits into this context. Biographies of monks (kōsōden-e or eden) were very popular at the time of the Kamakura, that theme being favoured by the emergence of many Pure Land Buddhist schools.

=== Ippen and the Ji-shū school ===
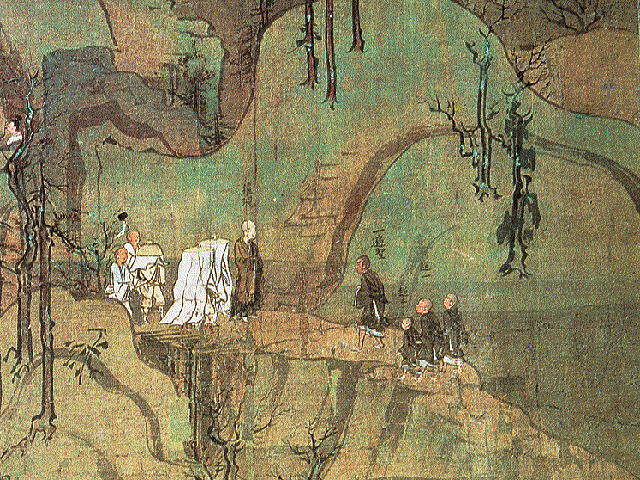
Ippen (dressed in black on the right) meets a monk in the Kumano Mountains (Scroll III, Section 1)

The various versions and copies of the Ippen Shōnin Eden relate the life of Ippen (1234–1289), a Buddhist monk who, in 1274, founded the Ji-shū school, one of the branches of Pure Land Buddhism that supplanted the ancient esoteric and elitist Japanese schools of the Kamakura period. Following the Pure Land principles, Ippen taught that the Amida Buddha (Amitābha) welcomes into his paradise anyone who has faith in him; he initiates the faithful to the daily recitation of the name of the Amida Buddha (nenbutsu) and the rituals of ecstatic dances and songs (odori nenbutsu), a simple religious practice accessible to all, even the poor and the uneducated. According to the accounts of the time, this doctrine would have been revealed to Ippen by a manifestation of the Buddha; Ippen then devoted his life to travelling throughout Japan, especially rural areas, to carry the message.

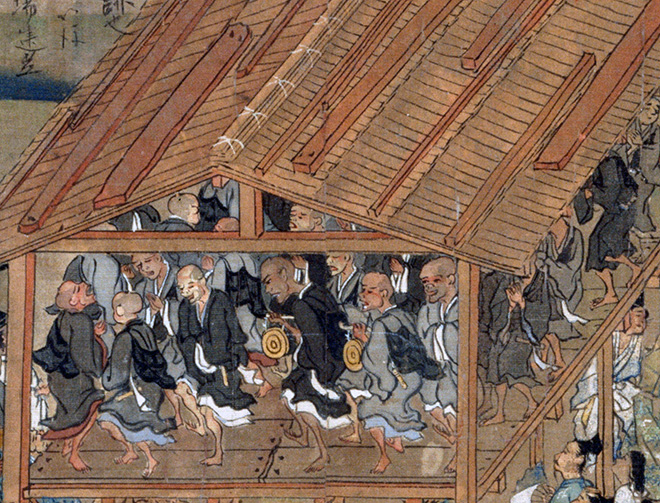
Detail showing Ippen and his disciples practising odori nenbutsu in Kyoto (Scroll VII, Section 8)

Born in 1239, Ippen was the second son of a family of the Kōno samurai clan in Iyo Province. He entered religious orders at the age of fifteen and studied the teachings of Pure Land Buddhism (known in Japan as Jōdo) in Dazaifu with Shōtatsu (聖達), himself a disciple of Shōkū (証空), before devoting himself to hermit meditation in the mountains. In the summer of 1274, Ippen retired to the Kumano shrine, a sacred place of the Shinto religion. According to legend, he there received a revelation (gongen) that invited him to spread throughout the country the faith of Amida: ie any man can access the Pure Land (ōjō) of the Buddha Amida through the nenbutsu, that is to say the recitation invoking his name.

From then onwards, Ippen travelled to temples and shrines in Japan to spread this doctrine. He also took the name of Ippen and lead the life of an itinerant pilgrim, distributing tablets with the nenbutsu inscribed on them. As a sign of a time when religious education was becoming more popular and accessible, Ippen preached in all places of everyday life: inns, markets, villages ... He accompanied his recitations of the name of Amida with ecstatic dances (odori nenbutsu) which seduced the populace with their "frenzied exaltation". In 1289, he fell ill and died in Hyōgo (now Kobe) at Kannon-dō (Shinkō-ji). He is said to have asked that no funeral rites be held for him.

It seems that Ippen converted a large segment of the population to the Ji-shū doctrine, perhaps more than 250,000 people. From the middle of the 14th century to the early 16th century, Ji-shū was probably one of the most popular Amidist schools in Japan. However, in the 16th century, it greatly lost influence, and nowadays it is no longer a minority religious movement.

== The two versions of the emakimono ==
The emakimono narrating the life of Ippen and collectively known as Ippen Shōnin Eden are divided into two lineages: those from the version known as Shōkai (聖 戒) (disciple and younger brother or nephew of Ippen), made in 1299, and those from the version referred to as Sōshun (宗 俊) (pupil of Taa (他阿), himself a disciple of Ippen), completed between 1304 and 1307, and now lost. The oldest and most famous of the Shōkai versions is known as Ippen Hijiri-e (一遍 聖 絵) and of the Sōshun versions is called Yugyō Shōnin Engi-e (遊行上人縁起絵) or Ippen Shōnin Ekotoba den (一遍上人絵詞伝).

Various direct or indirect copies of the Shōkai and Sōshun versions exist, such as the Shinkō-ji copy (1323), rather burlesque in the vein of the otogi-zōshi movement, the Miei-dō copy (second half of the 14th or early 15th century), close to the original of 1299, and the Kōmyō-ji copy (in Yamagata, made in 1594 by Kanō Eitoku), aiming at the extraordinary. The exhaustive list of temples or institutions with a copy today (excluding private collections and fragments) is:

- in line with the Shōkai version at Kankikō-ji (Kyoto): the Shinzenkō-ji copy (Kyoto, the so-called Miei-dō-bon, now stored in the Sonkyōkaku bunko library and in the Kitamura family collection), the Daigan-ji copy (Niigata) and the Fujita Art Museum copy (Osaka);
- in line with the Sōshun version at Shōjōkō-ji (Fujisawa; the original version has been lost, but the temple itself has a copy): the Konren-ji copies (Kyoto, two copies), and the copies known as Shinkō-ji (Kobe), Kōmyō-ji (Yamagata), Senshō-ji (Niigata), Raigō-ji (Niigata), Konkō-ji (Kyoto), Jōshō-ji (Onomichi) and Kondai-ji (Nagano); according to H. Sasaki, there are twenty complete or incomplete copies of this version, including the ones in private collections.

Biographies probably occasionally mix Ippen's life with those of other monks such as Hōnen, especially in relation to his apprenticeship at Tendai. Other famous monks also had their biographies depicted in emakimono, including Hōnen and Shinran.

== Shōkai version (1299): Ippen hijiri-e ==
=== Description ===
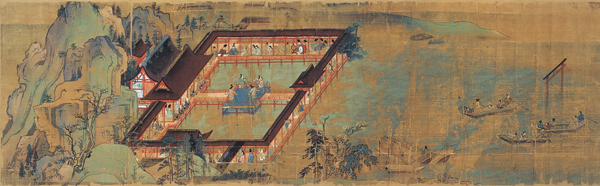
Ippen arriving at the Itsukushima Shrine in Miyajima, where young island girls dance in his honour at the centre; on the right is the famous floating torii (Scroll X, Section 2).

The very first version, known as that of Shōkai (disciple and close to Ippen during his lifetime), was completed in 1299, ten years after the monk's death, and remains the best known and most studied by historians and specialists in art history: with it, the art of the emakimono reaches "one of its peaks". The work consists of twelve scrolls 0.38 m (1 ft 3 in) high and 9.22 m × 10.90 m (30.2 ft × 35.8 ft) long, which have the distinction of being in silk (probably to mark the importance of the monk) and not in paper as is most common. The number of twelve scrolls has also been linked to Amida as the Buddha of the Twelve Rays of Light.

Its creation in 1299 is attributed to Shōkai, author of the text, while the paintings were carried out under the direction of the painter En'i (円伊), probably a disciple of Ippen during his lifetime, as evidenced by the faithful transcription of his life, and who could have been a high priest of Onjō-ji or a professional painter linked to the Imperial Court. The exact role of En'i remains open to interpretation: the size of the emakimono and variations in styles suggest that several assistants probably collaborated under the direction of the master. Stylistic studies enable the linking of the paintings with the workshops of the Onjō-ji (Mii-dera) and Shōgo-in temples, due to the proximity of mandalas conceived by the workshops. Four main styles have been identified for the calligraphy, the work of several aristocrats of the Imperial Court led by Sesonji Tsunetada, and carried out separately on silk coupons of various colours.

The sponsor is not known for sure or named on the colophon. The quality and richness of the work, carried out on silk, a luxury material and support of only one other emakimono known today (the Kasuga Gongen Genki E), strongly suggest an order from a wealthy patron of the court, probably a Ji-shū convert, to make an offering to Kankikō-ji. The most commonly advanced hypothesis as to the identity of this patron is that of the Grand Chancellor Kujō Tadanori.

Recognised as a National Treasure of Japan, the emakimono belongs to the Kankikō-ji temple in Kyoto (founded by Shōkai with the support of Kujō Tadanori), but is now kept in the National Museums of Kyoto and Nara. Part of Scroll VII, stored at the Tokyo National Museum since 1951, and a fragment of Scroll VI belonging to a private collector, were detached at the beginning of the Meiji era. Their state of preservation is generally good, despite a few lost or erased fragments.

=== Themes ===
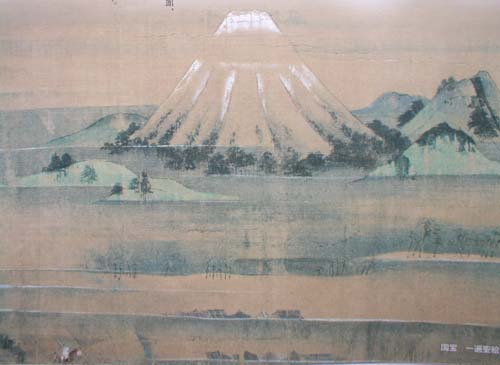
Mount Fuji, a "famous sight" of Japan often celebrated in poetry and painting (Scroll VI, Section 2)

The texts of the Shōkai version narrate the key episodes of Ippen's life in three broad periods: his initiation and his studies of Buddhism until the revelation of 1274 in Kumano, the creation of the congregation that would become the Ji-shū school, and the end of his life as he attracted large crowds of faithful to his sermons. Throughout the biography Ippen's sermons, prayers and many waka poems are quoted. Other texts on the foundation of temples and shrines (engi) visited by the monk are also included. Unlike later versions or other biographies of patriarchs, there is no intention in the paintings of this work to give a mystical or divine dimension to Ippen, who is often relegated to the background in favor of landscape illustrations. The calligraphies are more proselytising and relate the various miracles attributed to Ippen during his life, so that the text rarely corresponds to the images. The creator however avoids any excess and in this biography expresses affection and respect towards Ippen.

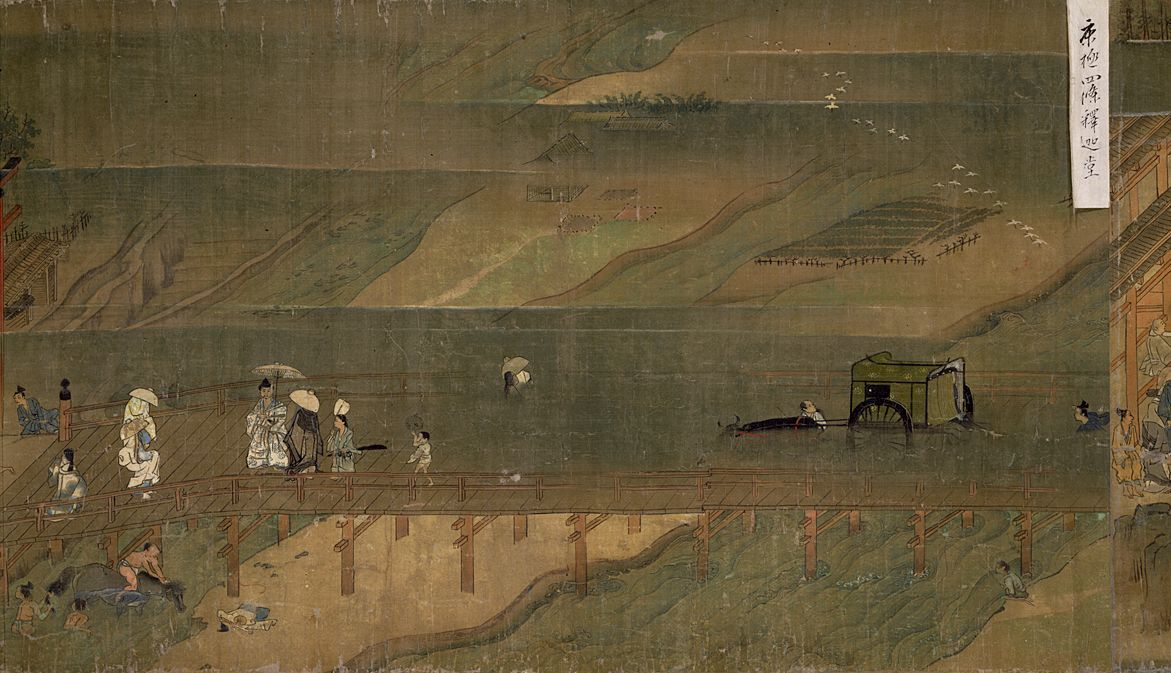
Famous transitional scene in which Ippen arrives in Kyōto via the Shijō bridge; the use of mist is strongly evident there (Scroll VII, Section 2)

The Shōkai version also appears very refined, full of restraint and intended for an elite, reviving the literary and pictorial tradition of the Heian court. The paintings and texts give a lyrical atmosphere to the work, via the themes of poetry, travel and pilgrimage. The landscapes are very numerous, faithfully transcribing easily recognizable famous Japanese sights, such as the emergence of Mount Fuji above the mist, the Itsukushima Shrine or the Nachi Falls, as well as numerous temples and places of pilgrimage such as Mount Kōya or Kumano shrine, the visiting of which had great importance in Ippen's life (and therefore loomed large). The work is similar in this sense to meisho-e paintings (paintings of famous views) and travelogues, traditional themes associated with the Imperial Court and poetry.

The importance given to landscapes and genre scenes remains rare in illustrated biographies of monks: here, the painter alternates stylised landscapes inspired by traditional Heian poetry and realistic representations of places and people, an original approach in the emakimono movement. By comparison, other illustrated biographies of monks (such as the Hōnen Shōnin Eden) emphasise the characters and the dynamism of the narrative, or fall into stereotyping and repetition.

=== Style and composition ===
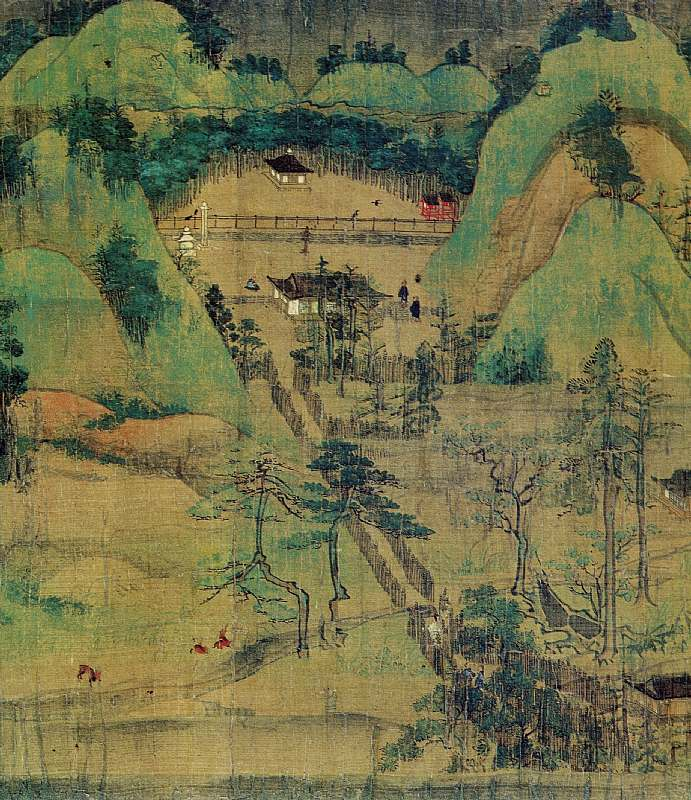
Landscape of Mount Kōya, in which the Chinese shanshui style is perceptible in the colours and the impression of 'progress' leading to the end of the journey, here the Okuno-in. Only the proportions of the people break the realistic perspective. (Scroll II, Section 4)

The emakimono, characterized by its realism and colours, belongs to the yamato-e style of the Kamakura period. However, unlike most emakimono of the day, the early influences of the wash technique of the Song dynasty in China are also on display. The work is based on the alternation between calligraphy and painted sequences, over 48 sections in total (in reference to the 48 wishes of Amida). Transitions between paintings are most often marked by expanses of mist or water, buildings or the change of seasons. The composition presents the same dualism between techniques typical of yamato-e and incorporation of Chinese Song and Yuan elements.

"If the work is sensitive to the influence of Southern Song wash painting, it nevertheless participates, while taking up yamato-e processes, in the new realistic trends of the Kamakura period [...] and explores thus a new pictorial space."

— Elsa Alocco Saint-Marc, Techniques de composition de l'espace dans l'Ippen hijiri-e (rouleaux peints du moine Ippen)

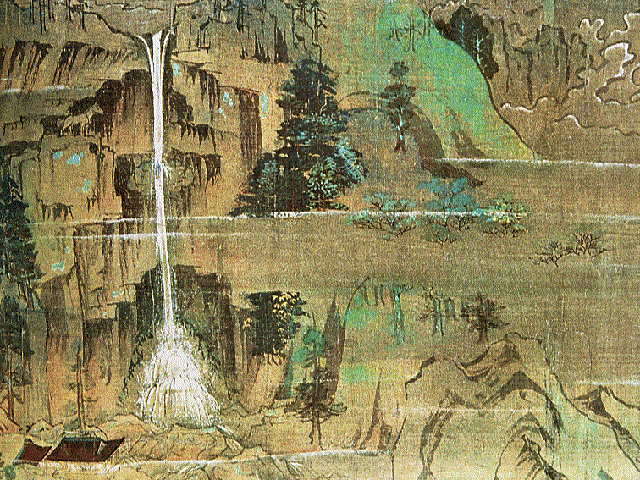
The Nachi Falls. At left is a white horse, symbolising Kannon. (Scroll III, Section 1)

Beginning with yamato-e, the scrolls exploit the classical composition techniques of emakimono: the whole is based on long parallel vanishing lines that accompany the eye movement and suggest depth, as well as distant elevated viewpoints (so-called "bird's-eye" perspective) and the intensive use of mists (suyari). The classic iji-dō-zu technique, which consists of representing the same character several times in a scene to suggest the flow of time and vary the rhythm with great economy of means, is also used on several paintings, for example the scene of the warriors (Scroll IV, Section 3), who, in the centre, first threaten Ippen, but then, at top left, are converted by the monk. Ippen having dedicated his life to roaming, the travel scenes dominate the work, but despite the importance of the landscapes, the subjective and non-realistic Japanese perspective remains tangible, the main elements of each section being enlarged in relation to the proportions of the sets. In particular, Ippen and his group always appear unusually tall compared with other characters and buildings, as they are central to the story (the religious emakimono had mainly a didactic interest). Secondary and local characters are consistently identified through inscriptions, but Ippen requires no such label: he is distinguished by darker skin, a taller stature and an elongated face, traits that remain consistent across every other artistic depiction of the monk. The point of view adopted varies between scenes in the same section in order to energise the story, which can sometimes be unusually distant, so that the details and the crowd become minuscule.

Landscape scenes, often performed in the styles of Chinese Tang ("blue and green"), Song and Yuan painting, dominate the composition in the Chinese lyrical and spiritual tradition (the art of shan shui). In particular, the first influences of the Song wash technique in Japan show through, the contours and inking being very close to the lively and rough line. Several details reveal that the artists were inspired by the style of the Southern Song: the framing of the compositions, the depth of the landscapes rendered by a succession of images, or the use of the side of the brush rather than the tip for the contours of the mountains. The influence of Chinese landscapes explains the marked realism of the paintings, especially in perspective, a realism that characterises the art of the Kamakura period. Thus, in spite of the unrealistic sizes of the characters and improbable points of view in height, the landscapes are most often deep and rigorously proportioned, reinforced by pictorial techniques such as painting the trees in a detailed way in the foreground and blurred in the background, or even flocks of birds that gradually disappear towards the horizon. The colour itself finally makes it possible to reinforce the hollows and reliefs.

Realism, much appreciated by the Kamakura bushis, was thus born from the influences of the Chinese landscape, but also reinforced by the dynamic and very detailed representation of everyday life. The emakimono of the 13th century attached particular importance to the representation of crowds here, with a penchant for the common. The drawings of the buildings still in existence today are for the most part so detailed that sketches must have been made on the spot during Ippen's travels, probably by En'i himself. The contrast between the precision of architectural details and unrealistic parallel perspective is felt in all the buildings. H. Okudaira also writes that "there is often a strong association between human emotions and the natural world" in this type of emakimono. There is in fact a correspondence between certain landscapes and feelings conveyed by the story, for example the cherry trees of Iyo painted just after flowering when Ippen leaves his home, to evoke the separation.

== Sōshun version (1304/1307): Yugyō Shōnin Engi-e ==
The emakimono based on the Sōshun biography, known as Yugyō Shōnin Engi-e or Ippen Shōnin Ekotoba den, is later than Shokai, from the early 14th century, between 1303 and 1307; only copies remain. These emakimono consist of ten scrolls, but the last six are dedicated to Taa, disciple and successor of Ippen and probably master of Sōshun; the text thus takes the point of view of Taa, rather than that of Ippen. The Sōshun version aims to consolidate Taa's position as Ippen's rightful successor, and presents an idealized and exaggerated view of the school. Unlike the Shōkai version, it clearly had a goal of proselytising, with the aim of converting and teaching poorly educated people. As a result, its composition is simpler and more varied, centred on the anecdotal, ultimately to convey everyday feelings such as humour or emotion, as well as the miraculous. Presumably, the artist was seeking to transmit the Amidist teaching through images, which required stylistic and narrative changes - the characters are, for example, represented taller than in real life to be better identifiable during sermons or e-toki (public sessions of explanation of religious paintings). This version, a rare document from the early days of the school, and intended for the general public, has been more copied than the Shōkai version.

In relation to several of their scenes, the various copies of the Sōshun version diverge in the importance given to certain characters or certain details, but the plan remains very similar. The first scroll deals with Ippen's revelation to Kumano and his early conversations about faith in Amida; the second depicts the first nenbutsu he danced, and his sermons to the people during his travels until his expulsion from Kamakura; the third continues with Ippen's voyages accompanied by his numerous disciples; the fourth concerns the end of life and the death of the patriarch; the fifth shows Taa's first sermon to a small local lord and the new hope it arouses among the faithful of the school; scrolls six to nine represent Taa's pilgrimages, sermons and nenbutsu dances, as well as the many miracles (in particular the apparitions of gods and bodhisattvas) punctuating their course; and the tenth scroll features the New Year's ceremony held by Taa in 1303, during which he identifies with Bodhisattva Kannon (Avalokiteśvara, related to Amida) and introduces himself as the co-founder of the Ji-shū school with Ippen.

== Historiographical value ==
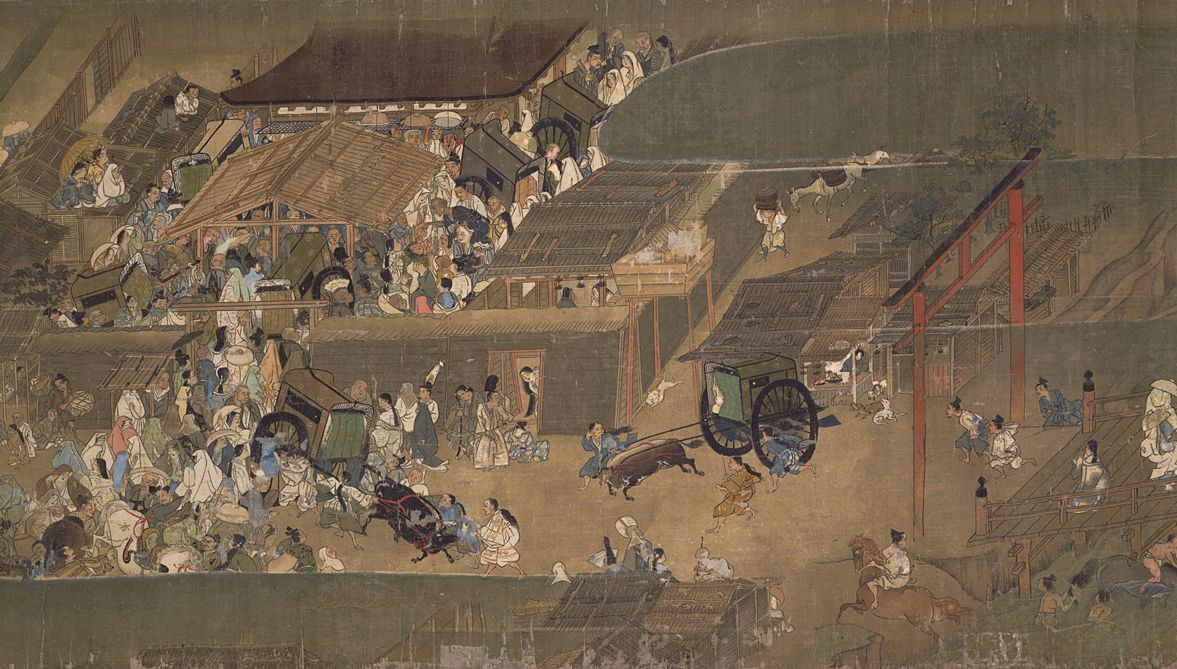
Swarming crowd in Kyoto (Scroll VII, Section 2)

In the historiography of Japanese religions, the original version of the Ippen Shōnin Eden (1299) is of inestimable value, as it is the earliest and most reliable of the biographies written about Ippen and the founding of the Ji-shū school, especially since its author, Shōkai, was a close relative and disciple of the monk. Testifying to a new Buddhist art under the Kamakura period, the work provides information on the architecture of many temples, and the religious practices of the time, in particular pilgrimages and nenbutsu, are well illustrated. The Yugyō Shōnin Engi-e, which reflects more the thought of Taa, the second patriarch of the school, than that of Ippen, is therefore rather centred on the early days of the history of Ji-shū. Beyond Buddhism, Japanese syncretism sometimes shines through, especially when Ippen honours Shinto shrines.

An everyday art, Shōkai's original version of the emakimono also provides a detailed testimony to the daily life of medieval Japan, as well as to the landscapes of the time (notably offering one of the first pictorial views of Mount Fuji). Today, the work presents such invaluable insights that it is widely studied, as much by historians as by art historians.

"The theme of this work combines the biography with a framework imbued with popular life and landscapes, and both aspects are rendered with the realism characteristic of the Kamakura period. We are thus given not only a highly personalized portrait of Ippen, but also a contemporary picture of Japanese landscapes and its inhabitants."

— Dietrich Seckel and Akihisa Hasé, Emaki: the classic art of Japanese painted scrolls''

Historians' studies focus on housing, clothing, food, travel, economic activities, rituals and social and cultural practices. As Ippen devoted his life to travelling, the urban as well as the rural aspect stands out. The swarming crowds in town are reminiscent of the art of ukiyo-e in the Edo period; one can find there, for example, one of the first representations of the shopping district of Osaka. The artist represents both the poor and the rich, focusing on beggars and the sick who sometimes litter the place, Ippen having preached to everyone. K. Satō sees in this the desire to "show us who were the people to whom Ippen really wanted to address" in medieval society: the downgraded, beggars and outcasts.

The city and country paintings, teeming with busy people depicting the daily life of the Japanese people, foreshadow later Japanese genre painting, the best-known movement of which is ukiyo-e.

== See also ==
- List of National Treasures of Japan (paintings)
- National Treasure (Japan)
