= Ippen =

Japanese Buddhist monk

Ippen Shōnin (上人)
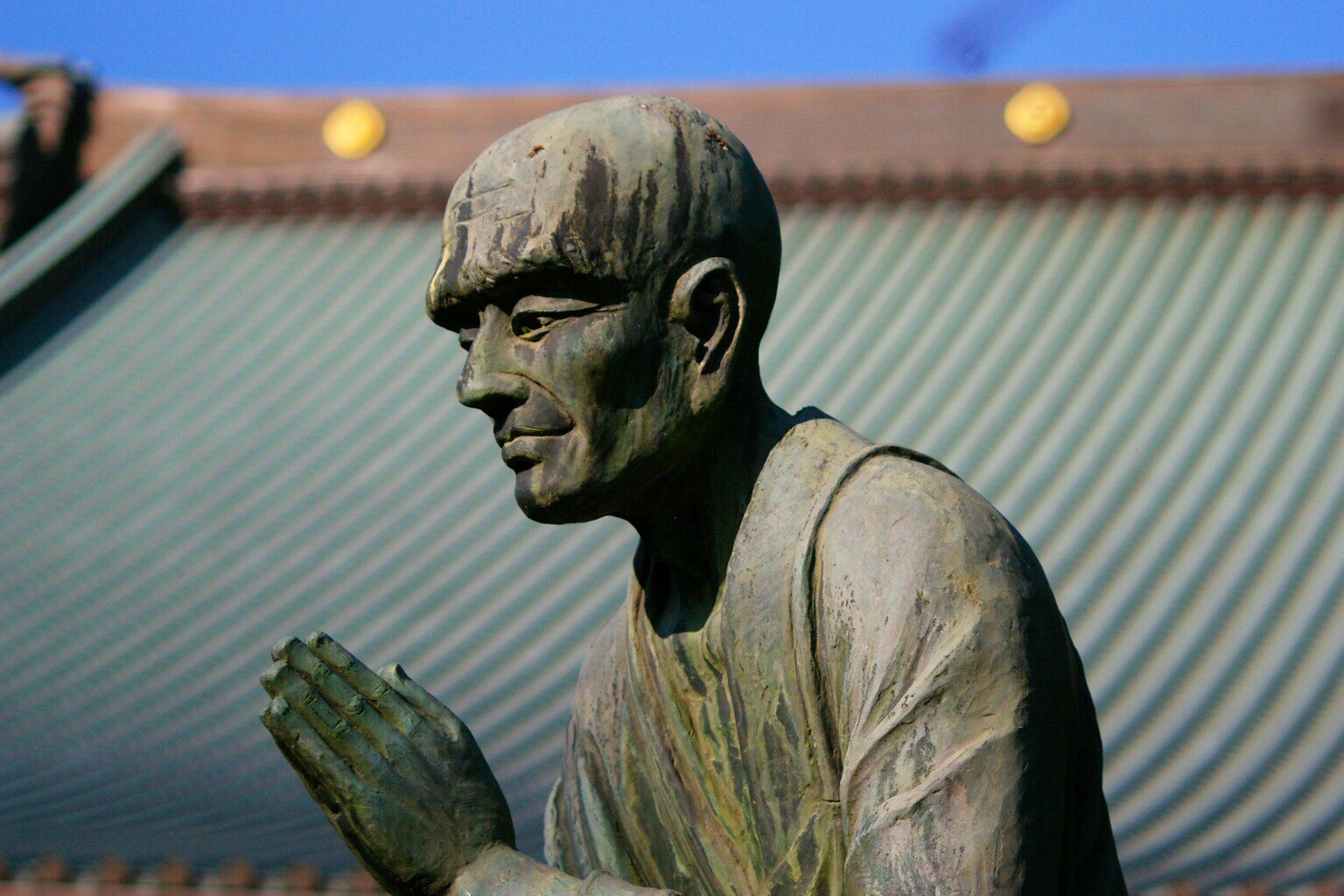
- Statue of Ippen at Shōjōkō-ji, Fujisawa, Japan
- Title: Grand Master (Daishi; 大師)

Personal life
- Born: Kawano Tokiuji (河野時氏), Tsūshū (通秀), or Tsūshō (通尚). 1234/9 Hōgon-ji, Matsuyama, Iyo Province
- Died: 1289 Shinkō-ji (now Kobe)
- Era: Kamakura Period
- Notable work(s): Ippen Shōnin Goroku (一遍上人語録; The Record of Ippen's Sayings)
- Other name: "Itinerant Shōnin" (Yugyō Shōnin 遊行上人) or "The Saint Who Cast Aside" (Sute-hijiri 捨聖)
- Posthumous name: Enshō Daishi (円照大師) or Shōjō Daishi (証誠大師)

Religious life
- Religion: Buddhism
- School: Ji-shū
- Dharma name: Chishin (智真)
- Monastic name: Ippen (一遍)

Senior posting
- Teacher: Shōtatsu (聖達)
- Disciples: Shōkai (聖戒); Ta'a (他阿)
- Influenced by: Shōkū (証空)

Ippen Shōnin (一遍上人) 1234/9–1289 was a Japanese Buddhist itinerant preacher (hijiri) whose movement, the Ji-shū (時宗; "Time sect") became one of the major currents of medieval Japanese Pure Land Buddhism.

Born in what is now Ehime Prefecture, he studied at the Seizan branch of Jōdo-shū before meeting many Shingon- and Tendai-associated hijiri, and then became a hijiri himself. During a Kumano pilgrimage, Ippen had an experience that inspired him to spread the Pure Land faith throughout Japan. Accompanied by bands of followers, he traveled throughout Japan teaching that salvation lay in the single-minded invocation of Amida's Name and that the very moment of recitation unites the reciter with the timeless enlightenment of the Buddha. Ippen traveled over fifteen hundred miles, visiting every major population center and devotional center in Japan, such as Kumano, Zenkō-ji, Taima-dera, and Mount Kōya.

In his itinerant ministry, Ippen combined the devotional recitation of the nembutsu with ecstatic dancing, and the distribution of ofuda (talismans) inscribed with the name of Amitābha, which he handed to people as symbols of faith and rebirth in the pure land of Sukhavati. His teachings blended the Pure Land ideal of other power with Zen non-dualism and the folk religious practices of wandering ascetics. Rejecting all self-powered efforts and sectarian distinctions, Ippen held that the simple recitation of even a single nembutsu invariably linked one with Amitābha's enlightenment, assuring rebirth in Sukhavati. Ippen's radical vision of faith and his insistence that the heart can attain birth in the Pure Land while the body remains in this world gave rise to a popular movement that appealed to all social classes. His life is outlined in the Ippen Hijiri-e, a series of emakimono (narrative painted scrolls) that serve as the main historical source for his life and activities.

== Biography ==
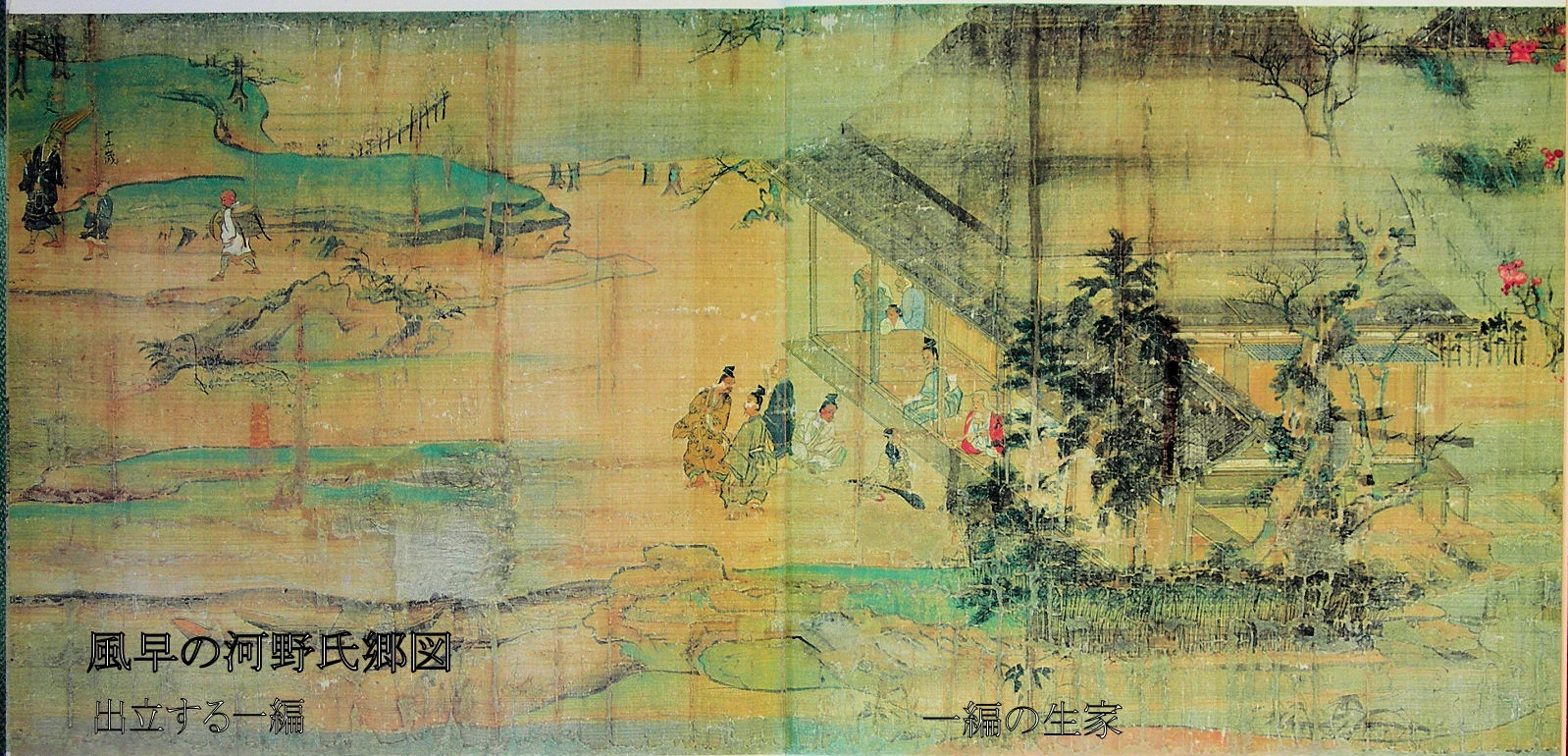
Ippen leaving home at thirteen to begin learning Buddhism (Scroll I of the Ippen Shōnin Eden)

=== Early life ===
Ippen was born to the Kōno clan who ruled the Iyo Province (modern Ehime Prefecture) on the island of Shikoku. After the decline of the Kōno clan, his father, Michihiro, became a monk at Hōgonji temple, which is where Ippen was born. Ippen's secular name may have been Kawano Tokiuji (河野時氏), Tsūshū (通秀), or Tsūshō (通尚). As a monk, he was given the Dharma names Zuien and Chishin (智真). Ippen means one (一) yet all pervading (遍). He is respectfully referred to as "Ippen Shōnin," where "Shōnin" (上人) signifies a holy person.

Following his mother's death and on his father's command, Ippen became a Buddhist monk at an early age and resided at Keigyōji temple as early as 1245. In 1251, he traveled to Dazaifu to study under a Tendai monk called Shōtatsu who was devoted to Amida Buddha and who urged Ippen to "learn to read the sūtras and commentaries of the Pure Land school." Ippen was also sent to study the Pure Land sutras in Hizen under a monk named Kedai, who changed Ippen's name from Zuien to Chishin, because Zuien refers to "various good karmic conditions," which sounded like a self-power oriented name. After studying with Kedai, he returned to study with Shōtatus for twelve years. Both Shōtatsu and Kedai were disciples of the Pure Land teacher Shōkū (1177–1247), who was the founder of the Seizan branch of Jōdoshū.

When his father died, the 25-year old Ippen returned to secular life and assumed family responsibilities at his home province of Iyo. He got married and became head of the household. Eventually, in 1271, he eventually felt called to renounce a second time, which, according to different accounts, was for one of four different reasons:

1. He had a philosophical insight about karma while watching a spinning top (Ippen Hijiri'e).
2. He was fleeing a relative trying to kill him in an inheritance dispute (Ippen Shōnin Ekotobaden).
3. He saw the hair of two of his napping wives turning into snakes, making him fearful of jealousy (Ippen Shōnin Nenpuryaku).
4. He had inheritance problems with his two jealous wives. (Hōjō Kudaiki).

Thereupon, during the national crisis of the Mongol invasions, Ippen took a pilgrimage to Zenkōji, drawn by legends of its "living" Amida statue and the influence of the Zenkōji hijiri (wandering sages) who he had previously met at Dazaifu. Hijiri were itinerant mendicants and preachers who were not ordained as Buddhist monks but could still become influential religious figures and fundraisers for temples and shrines. Ippen was influenced by such people, especially by Kūya, a popular tenth century nembutsu hijiri. At Zenkōji, he was influenced by the temple's beliefs in saving beings from hell, as well as the temple's enshrinement of the image of Shandao's analogy of the "Two Rivers and the White Path," which he copied and revered.

He then returned to Iyo and entered ascetic retreat in a place called Iwaya at Sugō, at a temple called Kubodera. At this temple, he hung the image of the "Two Rivers and the White Path" on his wall, and began a life of exclusive Nembutsu practice. After three years, he composed his central teaching, the verse on the "non-duality of ten and one."

In 1273, Ippen secluded himself in Iwayaji temple on the Kumano Kodō, a site associated with Kukai. He found resonance in his doctrine of the "non-duality of ten and one" with Kukai's teaching of "attaining Buddhahood in this very body," which led him to seek out esoteric teachings. He engaged in Shugendō (mountain asceticism) and became devoted to Fudō Myōō, thereupon receiving divine dreams. These experiences solidified his resolve and belief that that kami supported the Nembutsu.

In 1274, Ippen visited Shitennōji and then Mt. Kōya, which was a major site for a large old community of nembutsu hijiri who practiced Pure Land influenced by Shingon esotericism (as found in Kakuban's teachings). Ippen's practice of distributing nembutsu ofuda may have been influenced by the practices of these hijiri. At this point, Ippen seems to have become committed to a life of ascetic wandering.

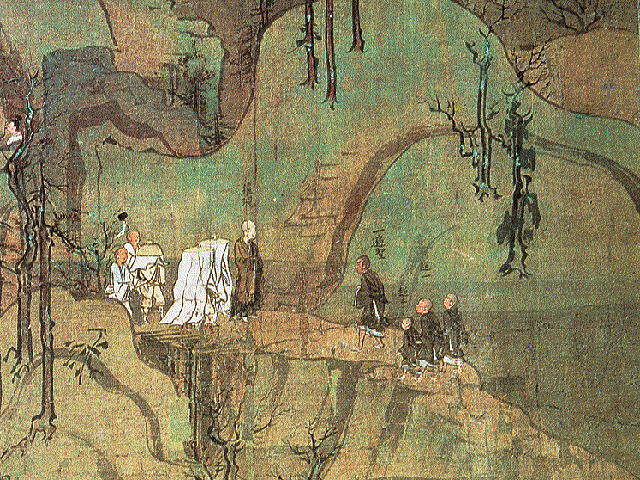
Ippen (dressed in black on the right) meets an ascetic in the Kumano Mountains.

Ippen then continued his pilgrimage following the Kii Peninsula south until he reached three major Shinto shrines at Kumano which were important sites for yamabushi mountain ascetics. From a Buddhist perspective (honji suijaku), the local kami Hongū had come to be known as a manifestation of Hōjō bosatsu (Dharmodgata, Truth Revealing Bodhisattva) as well as a manifestation of Amida Buddha. Ippen had a religious experience at this shrine that transformed his spiritual practice. After offering some ofuda talismans to a reluctant priest who felt that his faith was not true enough to accept the talismans, Ippen then prayed to the gongen Hongū at the hall of witness (Shojoden) in the main shrine at Kumano. According to the Ippen Hijiri-e:

When he had closed his eyes but not yet fallen asleep, the doors of the sacred hall were pushed open and a yamabushi with white hair and a long hood emerged. On the verandah three hundred other yamabushi touched their heads down in obeisance. At that moment Ippen realized that it was surely the Manifestation [gongen] himself and entrusted himself completely. Then the yamabushi stepped before Ippen and said, "Hijiri spreading the nembutsu of interpenetration [yuzu nembutsu], why do you go about it mistakenly? It is not through your propagation that sentient beings come to attain birth. In Amida Buddha's perfect enlightenment ten kalpas ago the birth of all sentient beings was decisively settled as Namu-amida-butsu. Distribute your fuda regardless of whether people have faith or not, and without discriminating between the pure and the impure."

This statement confirmed Ippen's nembutsu recitation practice along with his fuda distribution to all people as consistent with his non-dual Pure Land beliefs. This meant that the saying of a single nembutsu and the reception of a nembutsu talisman could act as the one nembutsu (ichinen) which marked someone's liberation in the Pure Land, an attainment which was already assured by Amida ten kalpas ago. Furthermore, there was no need for practitioners to make an effort to attain a specific state of faith or concentration. Ippen saw this teaching as being based on this direct revelation as well as on the sutras. He would go on to state "My teaching is the oral transmission bestowed in dream by the Kumano Manifestation".

After this encounter, Ippen devoted himself to nembutsu practice exclusively and to distributing the nembutsu fuda as a way to lead people to the Pure Land. He saw himself as a follower of the hijiri Kūya. Ippen soon sent a female companion back to Iyo with an ofuda print block for his half-brother Shōkai along with a poem which states:

The six character name is the one law;
The karmic beings of the ten realms are one body.
Abandoning the myriad practices and relying on the one nembutsu,
One rises among humans as a beautiful lotus.

=== Forming a new hijiri order ===
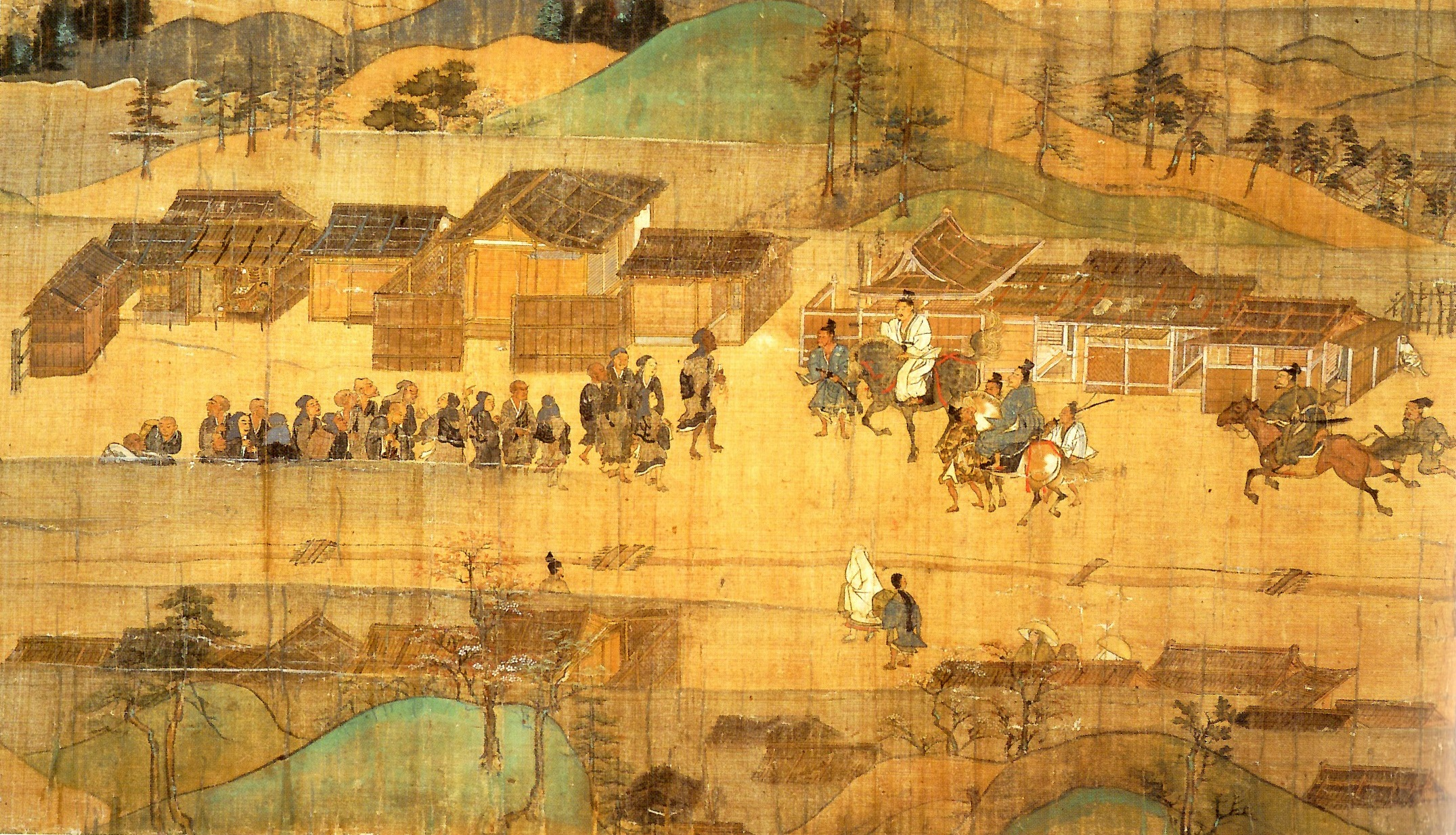
Ippen and his followers arriving at a town

Ippen then spent the next three years as a solitary hijiri before gaining his first and foremost disciple, Taa Amidabutsu. By the time he returned to Iyo in 1278 he may have had a few other followers as well. Ippen's activities were varied, and included chanting sessions (of nembutsu and sutra), practicing an ecstatic form of dancing nembutsu, handing out nembutsu ofuda (お札) and keeping a register of the converted.

His activities drew a wide following from all social classes. The dancing nembutsu practice began as early as 1279, and may have been derived from traditional funerary practiced tied with placating the spirits of the dead. In Ippen's teaching though, dancing nembutsu was seen as a spontaneous ecstatic expression of Ippen's joyful faith in the nembutsu. The idea that one's faith can lead to such ecstatic joy is also found in the Pure Land Sutras. The dancing nembutsu practice became quite popular throughout Japan and it was spread by many different groups not just Ippen's sect.

Ippen continued to travel throughout Japan, gathering a band of followers and proselytizing a unique version of Pure Land Buddhism. During Ippen's time, hijiri were often affiliated with specific temples and promoted specific geographical sites (especially mountains like Mount Kōya). However, Ippen created an independent group of hijiri not based on any single temple or site. Instead, his teaching was based on the immanent presence of Amida in all places. Nevertheless, this new universal movement also embraced all the popular devotions and local deities of Japan, since they were all considered to be manifestations of Amida Buddha's power. This universality and inclusiveness allowed Ippen's movement to absorb many hijiri groups, including those of Zenkōji and sections of Mt. Kōya's hijiri community. According to Foard, Ippen's movement soon emerged as "the leading order of medieval mendicancy, and perhaps the major source of Pure Land propagation for over a century and a half."

The tradition came to be known as "Jishū", a name which ultimately comes from a passage in Shandao to those who practice nembutsu in each of the six times of the day. This referred to specific periods of intense uninterrupted nembutsu practice that Ippen's group would undertake at certain times of the year where different hijiri would take turns in leading the chant during the six four-hour periods of the day. According to Foard, the intended meaning of the term is equivalent to “twenty four hours a day nembutsu group.” Male members of the group were given names that all ended in Amidabutsu (such as Taamidabutsu etc.), and female member names all ended in ichibō ("the one Buddha"). All members wore plain grey robes and black kasaya, and shaved their heads.

In 1279, while conducting a nembutsu chanting session in Nagano, purple clouds filled the sky and flowers fell. Shortly after this auspicious sign Ippen began to dance while reciting the nembutsu. People joined him while waving their arms and beating a rhythm on whatever implements they had at hand. Ippen would later say:

My meditative practice lies in letting my lips freely utter Amida's Name; hence, even the marketplace is my practice hall. My contemplation of Buddha lies in following after my voice; hence, my breath is a rosary...To the course of nature I give charge of my thoughts, words, and deeds, and to the working of enlightenment leave all my acts.

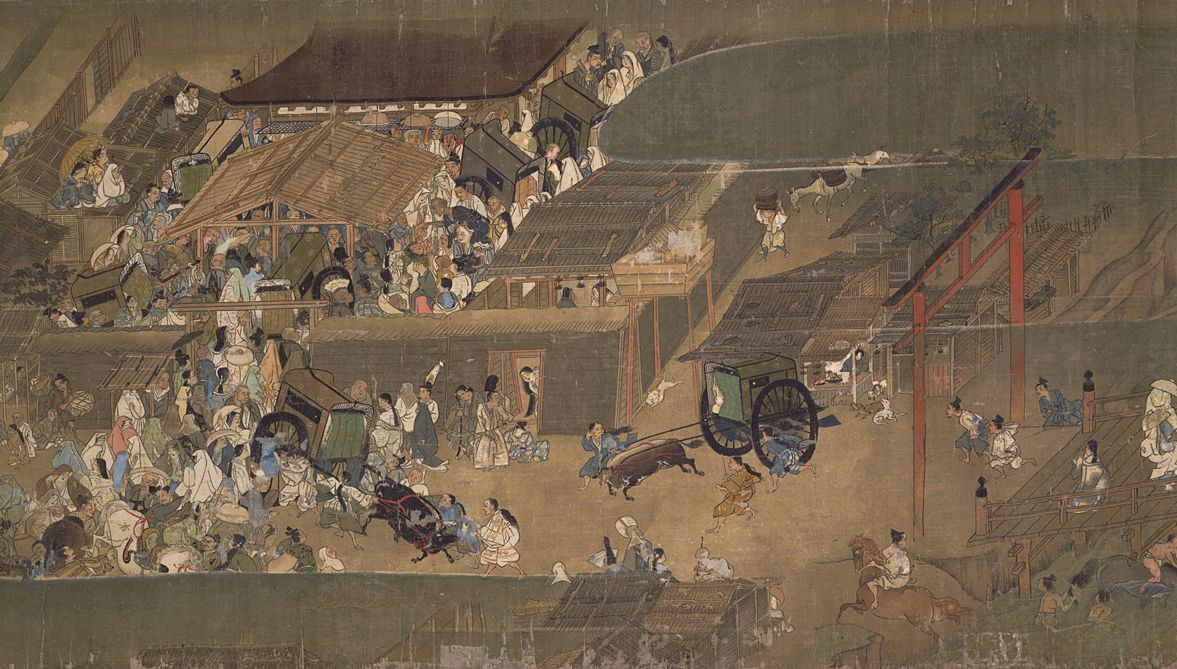
Swarming crowd in Kyoto (Scroll VII, Section 2 of the Ippen Shōnin Eden)

Ippen's group traveled around Japan performing the increasingly popular nembutsu dance at local temples, drawing large crowds, which would also donate to the sponsoring temple or shrine (a practice called kanjin). Perhaps the first such public performance was at Kagase (south of Kamakura) in 1282. This event also saw some of the first religious suicides for rebirth, a practice that was also admired by Ippen and his band. Further public events followed, which drew increasingly larger and boisterous crowds who clamored to receive Ippen's fuda. The core group of wandering hijiri often included about 20 to 30 close disciples. Ippen also tonsured many more followers who did not join the wandering group but stayed at home. According to the Hijiri-e, Ippen's movement drew people from all classes, including people from the lowest classes and those at the margins of society: "fishermen and itinerant peddlers were his companions on the road. He talked with lowly people whose names he did not know, and even before he spoke of the teaching, tough village elders made their bonds with the Dharma through him."

Throughout his travels, Ippen would give instructions and teachings to his followers, often passed down in poems. One such teachings is the Seigan Gemon, which states:

… until our present bodies
Are finally exhausted,
We shall not be devoted to mortal life,
But will take refuge in the Original Vow.
All our lives
We will single-mindedly chant the name …
Throughout the six divisions of night and day,
Successively, without interval,
Like an object and its shadow,
Never once parting from it …

Over time, various dōjōs sprung up associated with the Jishū order, though they were initially seen as secondary places, since the tradition was based on wayfaring mendicancy and never living in a single place.

Ippen's insistence on constant traveling and giving up of family and possessions led to his nicknames: Traveling Saint (遊行上人, Yugyō Shōnin) and Holy Man of Renunciation (捨聖, Sutehijiri). He also received the following posthumous names: "Grand Master Enshō" (Enshō Daishi 円照大師; granted in 1886), and "Grand Master Shōjō" (Shōjō Daishi 証誠大師; granted in 1940).

=== Death and Legacy ===
In 1289, Ippen passed away in Hyōgo. Maintaining his creed of itinerancy without fixed abode (issho fujū), Ippen claimed that “my work of guiding is only for this one lifetime”. Thus, thirteen days before his death, on the morning of 10th day of the 8th month, 1289, Ippen entrusted a few of the books he possessed to monks at Shosha-yama for dedication. He then burned all his remaining writings and texts while chanting the Amida-kyō, declaring: “All the sacred teachings of the lifetime of the Buddha are exhausted and brought to completion in Namo Amida Butsu.” Thus he left behind no scholastic system. Some of his works kept by some of his disciples however and eventually copied and published. Dennis Hirota has translated some of these writings into English in No Abode: The Record of Ippen (1997). Ippen also told his disciples not to waste their times in funerary rituals and to leave his body for the animals.

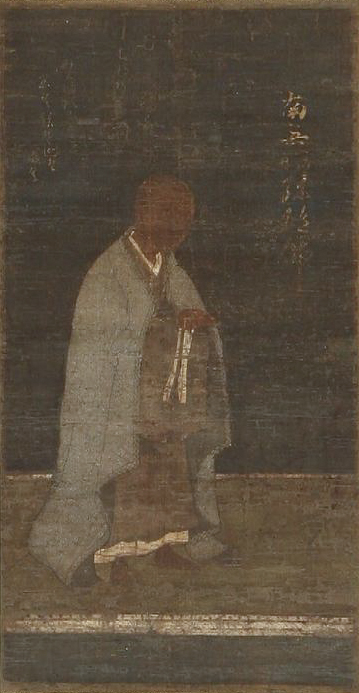
Taa Amidabutsu, a disciple of Ippen and architect of the Ji-shū sect

After Ippen's death some of his disciples committed religious suicide by jumping off a cliff, seeking to attain birth in the Pure Land together with him. Other key disciples, like Taa Amidabutsu and Shōkai continued to practice and promote Ippen's teachings. Shōkai went on to found Kankikō-ji temple in 1291. He also wrote the Illustrated Biography of the Itinerant Monk Ippen (Ippen hijiri-e), the oldest surviving Ippen biography. In 1292, three years after Ippen's death, Ippen's birthplace, Hōgon-ji, was rebuilt by his disciple Sen'a and became a key Ji-shū temple.

The current Ji-shū religious order regards Ippen as its founder, but its formal establishment as a sect was due to the work of Taa Amidabutsu and the later policies of the Tokugawa shogunate. From an institutional perspective, the key founder of Ji-shū was Taa Amidabutsu Shinkyō. After Ippen's death, Taa reorganized the various hijiri groups, which had originally disbanded, into a formal organization and began group wanderings again. Taa also established specific precepts and regulations for the Jishū monks, molding it into a proper religious institution. In 1304, Taa handed over the wandering group to the third leader of Ji-shū, Ryōa. Taa himself established a thatched hut in Sagami Province known as the Tōma Dōjō, where he stayed until the end of his life. This would later become the Konkōin Muryōkōji temple. The Jishu sect thrived during the Muromachi period, but later declined in size, as other Pure Land schools like Jōdo Shinshū grew.

In the Edo period, the lineages of Ikkō Shūshin and Koku'a, which are thought to have originally been separate hijiri systems, were absorbed into a formal Ji-shū sect that combined all temples aligned with Taa Amidabutsu's line along with other hijiri temples that regarded Kūya as a founder. This is how the modern Ji-shū sect coalesced.

== Teachings ==
=== Doctrine ===
While Ippen is primarily depicted as a wandering preacher who ministered to the common people in simple ways, his teachings reflected a deep knowledge of Pure Land doctrine. Ippen's teachings were primarily influenced by Shōkū, founder of the Seizan branch of the Jōdo-shū. Ippen was also strongly influenced by the nondualism of Zen and studied under the Zen monk Kakushin (覚心; 1207–1298), who was a student of Dōhan (道範; 1179–1252) and Dōgen (道元; 1200–1253). From Kakushin, Ippen received inka, a form of dharma transmission which recognised his Zen realisation.

Shōkū's view held that "the various Buddhist practices contain no more than a portion of the merit of the single practice of the nembutsu and serve merely to lead people to recite the nembutsu." As such, all other Buddhist practices are merely skillful means to lead us to abandon all self-power in an encounter with the Buddha's Original Vow and Other-power, an encounter manifested in the nembutsu.

Another key doctrine taught by Shōkū and adopted by Ippen was that the liberation of all beings was non-dual with the liberation of Dharmakara bodhisattva as Amida Buddha. Because of this, the one moment of saying the nembutsu is also the one moment of liberation, as well as the one moment of Dharmakara's attainment of Buddhahood as Amida ten kalpas ago. The practice of the nembutsu thus links us with the very enlightenment of the Buddha eons ago, which transcends time and space. This non-dual Pure Land teaching is termed kihō ittai in the Seizan school, which means "the oneness of sentient being and Buddha". It is a key doctrine taught in the Anjin Ketsujō Shō, a key Seizan work attributed to Shōkū.

Ippen's core doctrine, expressed in his poem of "the non-duality of ten and one," exemplifies this:

Perfect enlightenment ten kalpas past—pervading the realm of sentient beings;
Birth in one thought-moment—in Amida's Land.
When ten and one are nondual, we realize no-birth;
Where Land and realm are the same, we sit in Amida's great assembly.

Since Amida's enlightenment (the "ten kalpas past," i.e., when he attained buddhahood) pervades all reality, sentient beings can touch this the very moment we remember the Buddha through even a single nembutsu (this is the "one thought-moment" which is non-dual with the "ten"). When a person abandons self-power, all discrimination and false thinking and relies solely on Amida, they realize the immanent non-duality between themselves and Buddhahood, which manifests as the single-minded nembutsu. Ippen's doctrine, rooted in Seizan school teachings, is that these two events are nondual. Amida's enlightenment is the nembutsu of the present moment. Therefore, as Ippen wrote, "each moment is the moment of death, and each moment is birth in the Pure Land."

This single nembutsu in the present moment is also one with all nembutsus. It is also one with the coming of the Buddha (raigō) to meet us at death, as well as with our birth in the Pure Land. It is thus a timeless event in which, according to Ippen, "there is neither start nor finish, beginning nor end". This present moment of infinity is also described by Ippen as the realization of "no-birth" (anutpada), which is also a term for the ultimate truth. According to Ippen, after this realization "our hearts are Amida Buddha's heart, our bodily actions Amida Buddha's actions, and our words Amida Buddha's words, the life we are living is Amida Buddha's life." Indeed, from this percepctive, “among all living things—mountains and rivers, grasses and trees, even the sounds of blowing winds and rising waves—there is nothing that is not the nembutsu.”

No-birth stands in contrast to "birth and death" (samsara), as well as a "birth" in the Pure Land as something that only occurs in some future time. Since Amida Buddha as Immeasurable Life transcends all dualities, it transcends all conceptions of birth and death, and so ultimately transcends temporal "birth" while also reaching into the present moment.

According to this view, our rebirth in the Pure Land after death is attained immediately in the very moment we say the nembutsu, and this is identical with Amida's Buddhahood, a doctrine called sokuben ōjō. As Ippen says, “When one takes refuge in the name which cuts the flow of past, present, and future, there is rebirth without beginning or end.” (Hōgo Shū, 29). As such, on saying the nembutsu, we can be sure that we are will certainly be liberated, and do not need to concern ourselves with any other practices, doctrinal learning, or even with attempting to develop any specific mental attitude, including faith.

=== Saying the nembutsu ===
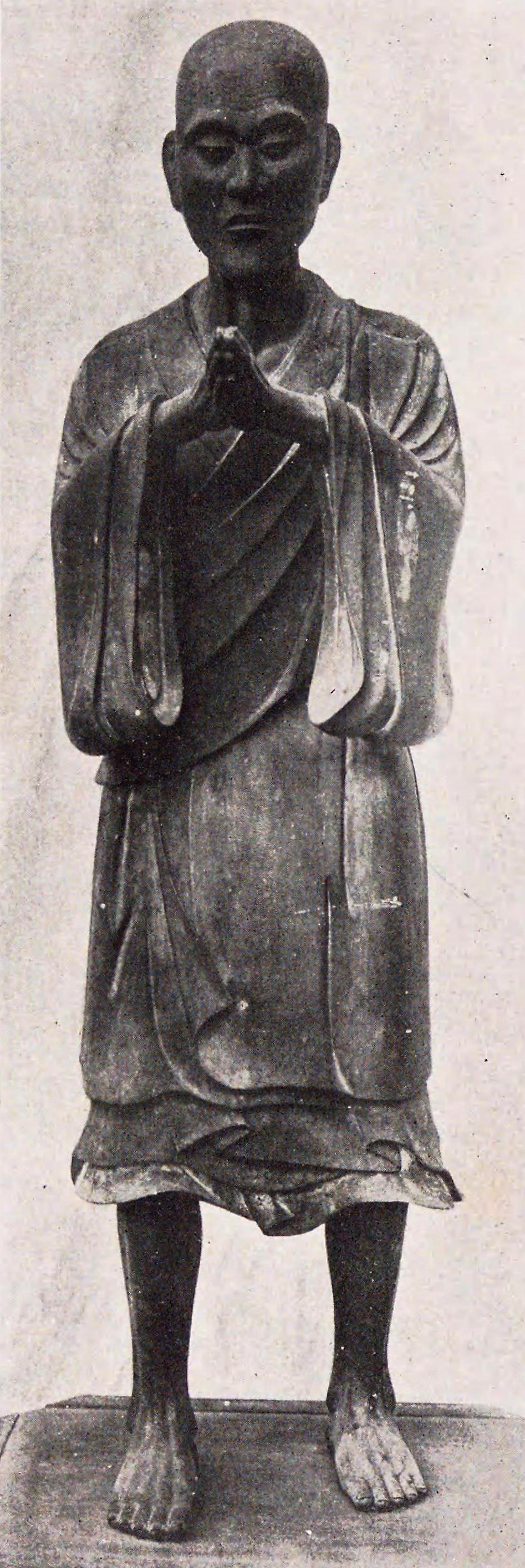
Statue of Ippen at Hōgon-ji, Matsuyama

This view of simple-minded nembutsu recitation is expressed in a letter by Ippen which characteristic of his teaching to say the nembutsu while "doing away with the multiplicity of expectations in our hearts." When asked by a follower what kind of mental attitude was needed for the recitation of the nembutsu, Ippen wrote in response that no special attitude was necessary besides just reciting Na-mu-a-mi-da-butsu and that nembutsu followers should not worry about these things and just focus on recitation. Ippen further writes:

When Kūya Shonin was once asked in what state of mind one should recite the Nembutsu, he answered simply, “Abandon”, and did not say anything further. This is recorded in Saigyō's Senjūshō. This saying is really the golden rule. The Nembutsu followers abandon wisdom, folly, the knowledge of good and bad, the thought of one’s social position, noble and mean, high and low, the fear of hell, the desire for a land of happiness, and even the aspiration for enlightenment as exhorted by different schools of Buddhism. In short the Nembutsu followers abandon all these. When the Nembutsu is thus recited, it is in perfect accord with the incomparable Original Vow of Amida. When the Nembutsu is recited without interruption with this frame of mind, there is no thought of Buddhahood or self-hood, not to say anything about the presence of an argumentative mood; the world of good and bad is no more than the Land of Purity itself and beside this there is nothing for which we cherish a desire or from which we turn away. The universe, with all its beings, sentient and non-sentient, with blowing winds and roaring waves, is no other than the Nembutsu. You must not imagine that man is the only being who is embraced by the incomparable Vow. But if my words are hard to understand, leave them as they are, giving no further thoughts to them, and just recite the Nembutsu putting your absolute trust in the Original Vow. As for the Nembutsu, whether you recite it with a believing heart or not, it never fails to be in accord with the incomparable Original Vow of other-power. In the Original Vow of Amida, nothing is wanting and nothing is superfluous. Beside this, what mental equipment do you wish to have? Only going back to the state of mind found in a simple-minded Nembutsu devotee, recite the Nembutsu. Na-mu-a-mi-da-butsu.

This practice is one which relies completely on the Buddha's other-power and abandons all self-power. Ippen held that any attempt to alter and improve the nembutsu by our own efforts is pointless, even any attempt to generate faith. According to Ippen, this self-powered attitude in when "we imagine that we can by ourselves learn and practise the way of severing ourselves from the bondage of birth and death." This attitude inevitably leads to pride, egoism and contempt towards others. As such, one must abandon all self-powered efforts, ideas and discrimination, and simply single-mindedly say the nembutsu without any further thought.

Ippen considered this view that was completely unconcerned with whether one had faith or not as having been a revelation to him from the Kumano Gongen. He describes this revelation as follows: "Make no judgments about the nature of your heart and mind. Since this mind is delusional, both when it is good and when it is evil, it cannot be essential for emancipation. Namu-amida-butsu itself is born." Ippen writes that after receiving this "I abandoned my own intentions and aspirations of self-power once and for all." Thus, for Ippen, we must reject the idea that we need to have faith at all, since it is just another attachment to self-power and discriminative thinking taking the guise of religious aspiration. Instead, we should "just return to the mind and heart of a simple, foolish person and say the nembutsu".

=== Hijiri practices ===
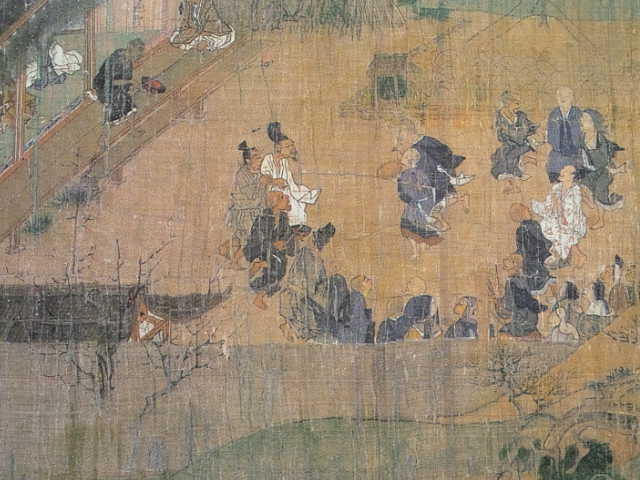
Ippen hijiri performing the dancing nembutsu

Ippen led the Ji-shū community on continual itinerancy (yugyō), guiding the people (including peasants and outcasts) to the Pure Land through the practices of dancing nenbutsu and fusan (distribution of nembutsu slips). Ippen's community adopted numerous religious practices from past wandering hijiri and local traditions like the yamabushi including mountain asceticism, pilgrimages to sacred places, retreats at sacred places hoping to receive divine messages in dreams or visions, funeral rites, distribution of talismans (ofuda), ecstatic dancing, and "the keeping of a register for recording the names of the faithful."

Regarding the dancing nenbutsu, Ippen taught: “Merely hearing that the nembutsu is the teaching of Amida brings such joy that one cannot help but dance." Ippen would also cite the Sutra of Immeasurable Life in defense of the practice, which states: "persons who have beheld a World-honored one in a past life are now able to entrust themselves to this teaching; With humble reverence they hear and uphold it, and they leap and dance, rejoicing greatly." Ippen's dancing nenbutsu events often became popular spectacles. In populated areas, a raised platform called an “odori-ya” was often set up, and men and women dancers (among Ippen's 20–40 companions, nearly half were nuns) formed a circle, singing and dancing until the spectators too were drawn in, reaching states of religious ecstasy. Its extreme and frenzied character provoked resistance from conservative circles.

==== Method of propagation ====
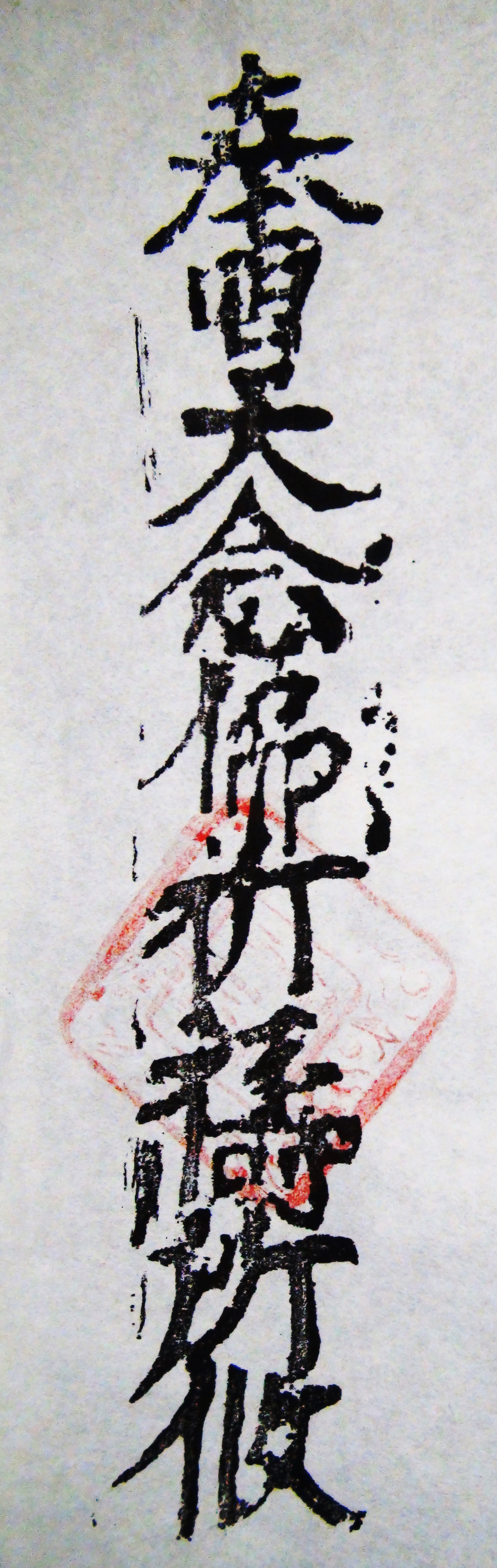
Simple paper fuda given out in the Musho-no dancing nembutsu celebration held at Uenohara City, Yamanashi Prefecture

While his thought has been praised by thinkers like Yanagi Muneyoshi, Ippen himself placed value not on abstract doctrine but focused on the practice of propagating the single-minded recitation of the six-syllable nembutsu. The way Ippen taught the nembutsu to others is described by the term ippen-nembutsu (single nembutsu, or "once" nembutsu) which indicated a single racitation of "Namu-amida-butsu" (I take refuge in Amida Buddha). According to Hirota, his method of propagation "seems to have been an 'exchange' or 'bestowal' of utterance in which Ippen, reciting the Name himself, would urge a passerby to follow his example." This first single utterance was seen as highly important for Ippen, since it indicated that the person was now sure to attain rebirth in the Pure Land. Furthermore, this single moment of recitation is also non-dual with the essence of Amida's Buddhahood.

After a person had responded to Ippen's nembutsu with a recitation of their own, Ippen would then hand them a slip of paper (fuda) with "Namo Amida Butsu" (南無阿弥陀仏; meaning "I pay homage to Amida Buddha") printed on it. Ippen describes this as an image which could be used on an altar, indicated that they might have been considered as sacred honzon by the people. Since Amida's name was considered to embody enlightenment itself, it could also have served as concrete symbol of an individual's conversion and future enlightenment. It thus served as a tangible link to the sacred for common people and made their religious practice of accepting the nembutsu an embodied one rather than an intellectual one.

Ippen wished to lead as many people as possible to birth in the Pure Land (a concept known as issai shujō ketsujō ōjō, the certain rebirth of all sentient beings), and so distributed these slips widely. They were inscribed with "The anjin [faith] of the Universal Vow of the Six and the Eight" (安心の六八の弘誓), meaning, "Namo Amida Butsu" along with the eight characters "Ketsujō Ōjō Rokujūmannin" (決定往生六十万人; which can be translated as "600,000 people are determined of birth in the Pure Land", or "Decisive settlement of birth: sixty myriad people").

The figure “600,000” or "sixty myriad" was derived from the first characters of the following verse by Ippen:

The six-character Name is the Dharma teaching of Ippen;
the dependent and true realms of the ten realms are the body of Ippen;
the abandonment of ten thousand practices and meditations are the realisation of Ippen;
the highest grade of the highest rank [referring to the ranks in the Contemplation Sūtra] of persons are the supreme and wondrous flowers (puṇḍarīkas).

This number, whose size could represent the concept of a very large number, stood for all sentient beings. Sixty was also the approximate number of provinces in Japan, and so was meant as an aspiration to bring the Pure Land teaching to everyone. The numerology of this phrase also links all these people to the six characters of the nembutsu, indicating the non-duality between Buddha and sentient beings as taught by Shōkū, a doctrine known as kihō ittai. Toshio Ōhashi compared these slips to tickets guaranteeing rebirth in the Pure Land—like boarding passes for a train bound there. According to one account, the number also indicated that Ippen would first allot 600,000 woodblock printed slips, then repeat the distribution for further groups of 600,000.

Ippen also directed his followers to create a nembutsu registry where the names of all those who had received the slips were counted. This practice may have been adopted by Ippen from previous figures like Ryōnin, the founder of the Yuzu nembutsu sect. According to the Hijiri-e, the total number reached 251,724. Other sources state that the number of adherents who received Ippen's slips and inscribed their names in the subscription registers eventually reached 2.5 million.

== Art ==
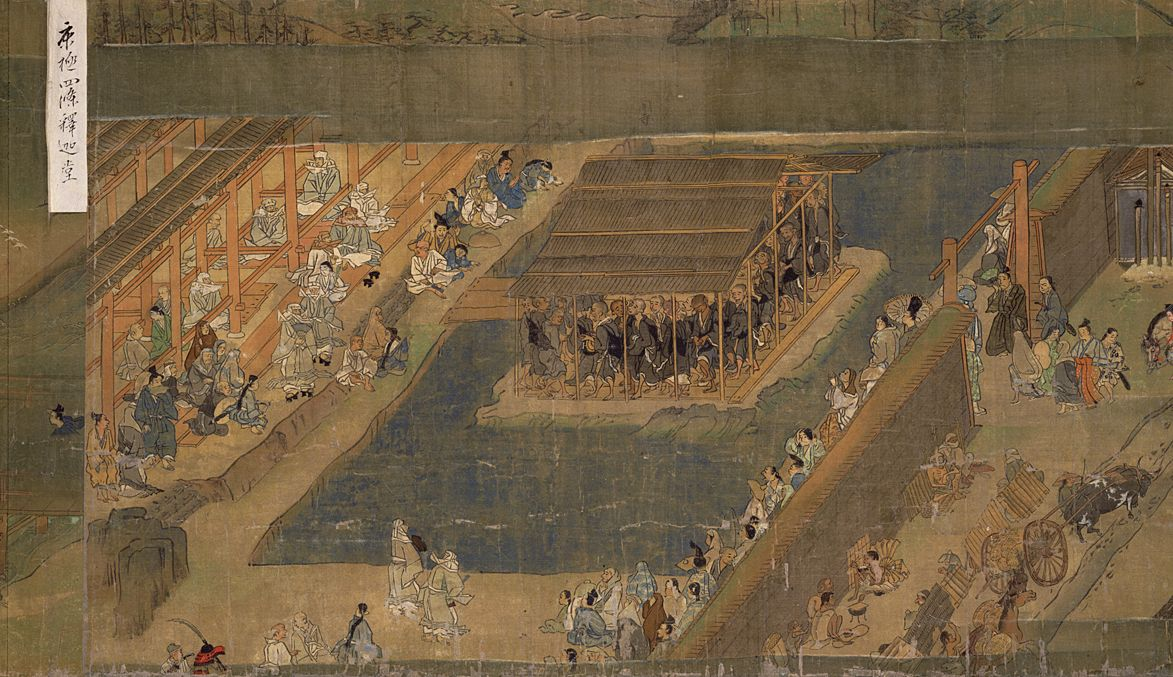
Illustrated Biography of the Priest Ippen: Volume 7. Kamakura period, 1299.

Ippen himself was greatly devoted to paintings of Shandao's allegory of the "White Path", so it is appropriate that his life led to the production of a great many portraits, sculpted images, and illustrated narrative scrolls (emaki 絵巻).

The Ippen Hijiri-e (一遍聖絵) was edited by Ippen's disciple Shōkai (聖戒) and, according to an inscription dated 1299, was painted by the artist En'i (円伊) (Kankikō-ji 歓喜光寺, Kyoto, and Tokyo National Museum). The twelve handscrolls on silk show Ippen's trip around Japan, and are well known for their naturalistic depiction of "famous places", including Mount Fuji (富士), Kumano, Shitennō-ji (四天王寺), Zenkō-ji (善光寺), Enoshima (江ノ島), Yoshino (吉野), Itsukushima (厳島), and Naruto (鳴門). The treatment of space shows the influence of Song and Yuan Chinese landscape painting. A second type of biographical handscroll Ippen Shōnin Engi-e 一遍上人縁起絵), edited by Ippen's other disciple, Sōshun (宗俊), was painted sometime between 1304 and 1307. The original scrolls no longer exist but were copied in many other versions including those at Shinkō-ji (真光寺), Hyōgo Prefecture. These versions are characterized by the addition of the biography of Ippen's most important disciple, Taa (他阿, 1237–1319). In the Shinkō-ji version, the first four scrolls depict Ippen's life, while the last six concern the life of Taa and the spread of Ji Sect teaching. The Kinren-ji (金蓮寺) in Kyoto has a Muromachi period copy of the now-lost work dated 1307.

== Bibliography ==
- Asano, Jun’i. (1999) 一遍上人と大三島 (Ippen Shōnin and Ōmishima). Imabari City, Ōmishima-chō: Manpukuji.
- Foard, James Harlan (1977). Ippen Shônin and popular Buddhism in Kamakura Japan, Dissertation, Stanford University. OCLC
- Foard, James Harlan (2006). The Pure Land Tradition: History and Development, Fremont, CA: Jain Publishing. ISBN 978-0-89581-092-2. pp. 357–398
- Griffiths, Caitilin J. (2011). Tracing the Itinerant Path: Jishū Nuns of Medieval Japan, Thesis, University of Toronto.
- Hirokami, Kiyoshi. 一遍 (Ippen). 日本大百科全書 (Nipponica Encyclopaedia of Japan). Tokyo: Shōgakukan.
- Hirota, Dennis (1997). No Abode: The Record of Ippen, (Ryukoku-Ibs Studies in Buddhist Thought and Tradition), Honolulu: University of Hawaiʻi Press, ISBN 0-8248-1997-7
- Imai, Masaharu. 照大師 (“Great Teacher Enshō”). 世界大百科事典 (World Encyclopedia). Tokyo: Heibonsha.
- Kaufman, Laura S. (1992). Nature, Courtly Imagery, and Sacred Meaning in the Ippen Hijiri-e. In James H. Sanford (ed.), Flowing Traces Buddhism in the Literary and Visual Arts of Japan, Princeton, N.J.: Princeton University Press; pp. 47–75
- Matsunaga, Daigan, Matsunaga, Alicia (1996), Foundation of Japanese buddhism, Vol. 2: The Mass Movement (Kamakura and Muromachi Periods), Los Angeles; Tokyo: Buddhist Books International, 1996. ISBN 0-914910-28-0
- Noda, Hideo. 明照大師嘉号請願考 (A Study on the Petition for the Honorific Title of Great Teacher Myōshō). Kōryō Shigaku [鷹陵史学] 12 (1986): 156. Kyoto: Bukkyō University Institute for Historical Research.
- Ōhashi, Toshio. (1978) 一遍と時宗教団 (Ippen and the Ji-shū Order). Tokyo: Kyōiku-sha.
- Sae, Shūichi. (2002) わが屍は野に捨てよ (Cast My Corpse upon the Field). Tokyo: Shinchōsha.
- Shimokawa, Kōshi. (2011) 盆踊り：乱交の民俗学 (Bon Odori: The Folklore of Orgy). Tokyo: Sakuhinsha, 2011. ISBN 978-4-86182-338-1.
- Soda Keiko. (2015) Ippen: The Japanese Buddhist "Sage Who Abandoned All." Translated by Sarah J. Horton. Himeji: Bookway, 2015. ISBN 978-4-86584-027-8
- Thornton, S.A. (1999). Charisma and Community Formation in Medieval Japan: The Case of the Yugyo-ha (1300-1700). Cornell East Asia Series no. 102, Ithaca: Cornell University, ISBN 1-885445-62-8.
- Tachibana, Toshimichi & Umeya, Shigeki (eds.). (1989) 一遍上人全集 (Collected Works of Ippen Shōnin). Tokyo: Shunjūsha.
