= Ji-shu =

Japanese Buddhist sect

Ji-shū
- 時宗
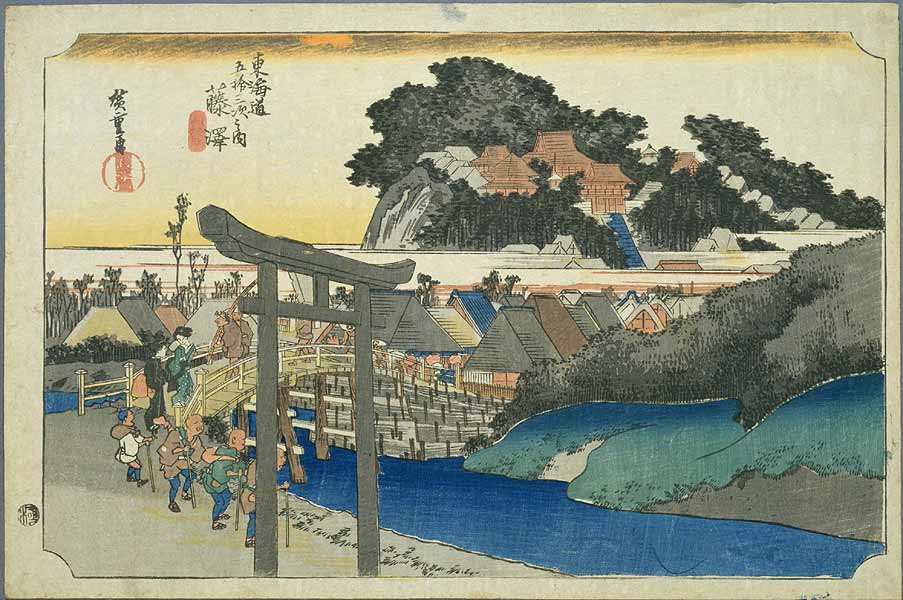
- Shōjōkō-ji, by Hiroshige
- Classification: Pure Land Buddhism
- Headquarters: Shōjōkō-ji
- Founder: Ippen, Taa Amidabutsu

Ji-shū (時宗, lit. time sect) is a Japanese school of Pure Land Buddhism founded by the itinerant ascetic Ippen and his disciples. The school has around 500 temples and 3,400,000 followers. The school is also known for its practices of dancing nembutsu (nembutsu odori) and for the distribution of nembutsu talismans (ofuda). Shōjōkō-ji (清浄光寺), a temple located in Fujisawa, Kanagawa, serves as the headquarters of the sect today.

Ji-shū means "school of time" and the name is derived from its central practice of chanting the Nembutsu at regular intervals. This refers to specific periods of intense uninterrupted nembutsu practice that Ippen's group would undertake at certain times of the year. During these retreats, different monks would take turns in leading the chant during the six four-hour periods of the day. According to J. H. Foard, the intended meaning of the term is equivalent to “twenty four hours a day nembutsu group.”

Ji-shū is one of the four Pure Land Tradition (Jōdo kei, 浄土系) schools of Japanese Buddhism, the others being Jōdo-shū, the Jōdo Shinshu, and Yuzu Nembutsu.

== History ==
=== Early history ===
The initial order which led to the sect was founded in by the itinerant Pure Land ascetic (nembutsu hijiri) Ippen. In addition to the practice of nembutsu, Ippen was strongly influenced by the teachings of the Pure Land master Shōkū, as well the practices of past wandering holy men (hijiri) like Kūya (903–972) and the hijiris of Mt. Kōya. Ippen was also influenced by Zen Buddhism and he received Dharma transmission as a Zen master from Rōshi Kakushin.

Ippen led his order on continual wandering throughout Japan (a practice called yugyō), visiting all major towns and holy places and gathering a following. The group promoted nembutsu practice to all people (including peasants and outcasts) through practices like the dancing nenbutsu and the distribution of talismans or ofuda. Ippen's community adopted numerous other religious practices from past wandering hijiri and local traditions like the yamabushi including mountain asceticism, pilgrimages to sacred places, retreats at sacred places hoping to receive divine messages in dreams or visions, funeral rites, and "the keeping of a register for recording the names of the faithful."

=== Middle Ages ===
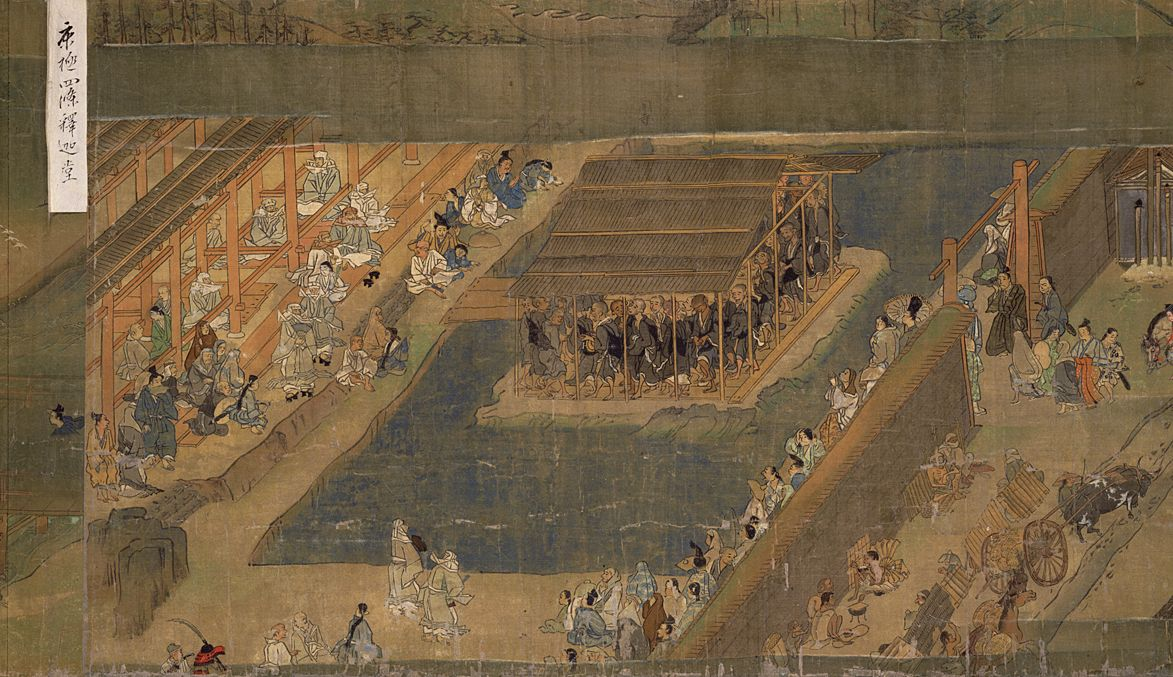
A depiction of nembutsu odori from the Illustrated Biography of the Priest Ippen

After Ippen's death, the Ji-shū sect he had led initially disbanded. Key disciples, like Ta'a Amidabutsu and Shōkai continued to practice and promote Ippen's teachings. Shōkai went on to found Kankikō-ji temple in 1291. He also wrote the Illustrated Biography of the Itinerant Monk Ippen (Ippen hijiri-e), the oldest surviving Ippen biography. In 1292, three years after Ippen's death, Ippen's birthplace, Hōgon-ji, was rebuilt by his disciple Sen'a and became a key Ji-shū temple.

The current Ji-shū religious order regards Ippen as its founder, but its formal establishment as a sect was due to the work of Ta'a Amidabutsu and the later policies of the Tokugawa shogunate. From an institutional perspective, the key founder of Ji-shū was Ta'a Amidabutsu Shinkyō, who reorganized the various hijiri groups into a formal organization of wandering ascetics after Ippen's passing.

As part of his organization efforts, Ta'a introduced the doctrine of "devotion to knowledge" (知識帰命, chishiki kimyō), which positioned monks of the Ji-shū as "messengers of the Buddha" (仏の御使い, hotoke no otsukai) in relation to ordinary believers and required believers pledge complete obedience to them, as the master was seen as the karmic link between the believer and the Pure Land. It was believed that the head priest of Shōjōkō-ji was the de jure representative of Amida Buddha on earth, and the leader of all Ji-shū followers. As such, he was understood to hold power over salvation and could determine who was born in the Pure Land or not through the "Register of the Past," being able to withdraw salvation by simply marking certain members as "not born in the Pure Land" (不往生, fuōjō) in the registry. While the other schools of Jōdo-shū and Jōdo Shinshū, especially under Rennyo, were strictly critical of this doctrine, believing salvation comes from Amida Buddha alone, the Shin priest Ryōgen (了源 1295–1336) adopted a similar registry at Bukkō-ji.

Ta'a also established specific precepts and regulations for the Ji-shū monks, molding it into a proper religious institution. In 1304, Ta'a handed over the wandering group to the third leader of Ji-shū, Ryōa. The leaders of the sect who succeeded Ippen and Ta'a were called Yugyo Shonin (遊行上人), who, like Ta'a, traveled around the country, practicing scheduled nembutsu and nembutsu dance. Ta'a himself established a thatched hut in Sagami Province known as the Tōma Dōjō, where he stayed until the end of his life. This would later become the Konkōin Muryōkōji temple. The Ji-shū sect thrived during the Muromachi period, but later declined in size, as other Pure Land schools like Jōdo Shinshū grew.

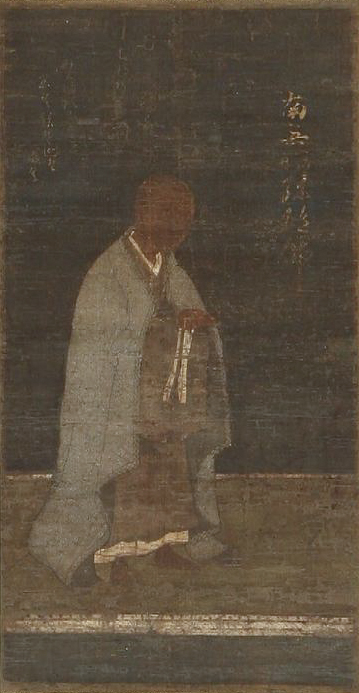
Ta'a Amidabutsu, the main disciple of Ippen and founder of the school proper

In the mid-Muromachi period, the sarugaku performers Kan'ami and Ze'ami bore the Buddhist name of the Ji-shū sect, being known as Dōbō-shū, Buddhist sculptors, and garden designers. The Ji-shū sect reached their heyday as influential cultural leaders during this time, but leading a large number of Nembutsu practitioners on their travels entailed many difficulties and the sect slowly became more based on temples and shrines. As the sect developed, it also began to approach those in power in order to carry out its travels smoothly. However, the more it relied on the patronage of the shogunate and feudal lords (daimyo), the more it lost its popularity with the common people. The Ji-shū sect's influence was also eroded by the missionary activities of the Jōdo Shinshū and Sōtō sects, which were growing more popular with the lower classes.

=== Early Modern Period ===
In the Edo period (1600 to 1868), the lineages of Ikkō Shūshin and Koku'a, which are thought to have originally been separate hijiri systems, were absorbed into a formal Ji-shū sect that combined all temples aligned with Ta'a Amidabutsu's line along with other hijiri temples that regarded Kūya as a founder. This combination of sects was done under pressure from Tokugawa government policies.

These various sects which came together into the modern "Ji-shū school" are known as "the 12 schools of Ji-shū". The mainstream was the Yugyō school whose main temples were Yugyō-ji (遊行寺) and Shichijo Dojo Konko-ji. The Ji-shū sect declined in size in comparison to other schools during this period. Nevertheless, under the Shogunate's han system, the practice of yugyō (itinerant monasticism) was supported with the backing of the Shogunate, and Ji-shū monks traveled all over the country, including areas without Ji-shū temples.

=== Modern Era ===
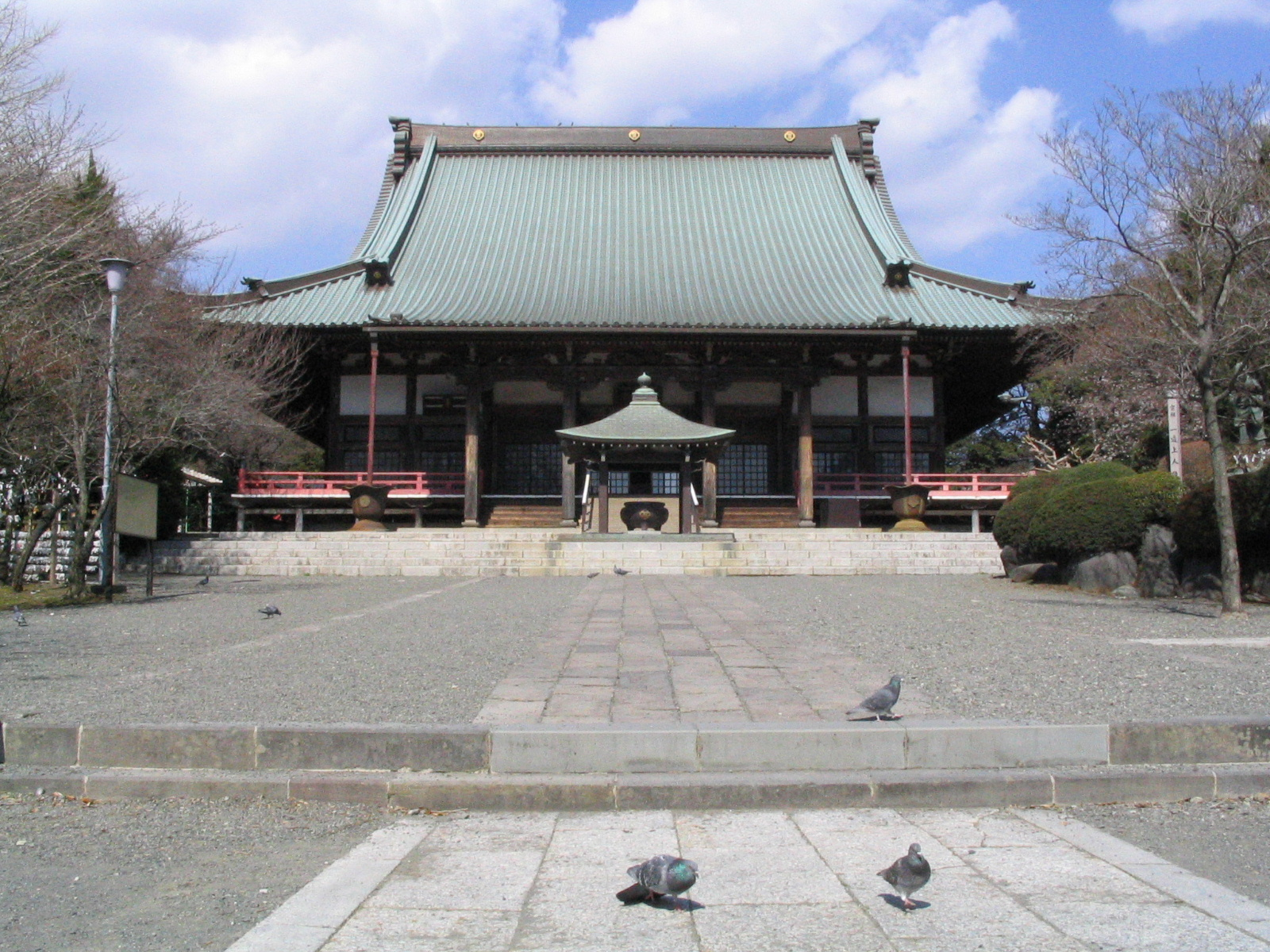
Shōjōkō-ji (清浄光寺), also known as Yugyō-ji (遊行寺), the main headquarters of the modern sect

In 1871, the Ji-shū sects fell into a difficult position due to the order to confiscate temple lands and the order to abolish the use of shrine money. Furthermore, the anti-Buddhist movement (haibutsu kishaku) led to the destruction of Ji-shū temples in the territories of the Satsuma Domain and Sado Island, which were considered Ji-shū strongholds. In 1940, Ippen Shonin was bestowed the title of "Shosei Daishi" (証誠大師). In response to this, during the Second World War, Ji-shū cooperated with the government by forming the Ji-shū Patriotic Association and establishing the Yugyoji branch temple in Mukden, Manchuria.

In 1943, the Ikkō-shū sect left Ji-shū and joined the Jōdo-shū sect.

Though it is significantly smaller than the Jōdo-shū and Jōdo Shinshū sects, the Ji-shū remains a living and influential tradition in Japanese Buddhism, with over 400 active temples today. One of the most influential figures in the 20th century was Enju Kato 加藤円住 (1919–2021) abbot of the head temple of Shōjōkō‑ji (清浄光寺).

Enju Kato's teaching centers on an existential and psychological understanding of Ippen's teaching of renunciation and letting go. He interprets renunciation as the act of releasing self-centered desires, relinquishing attachment to outcomes, and suspending egocentric control. For Kato, this act of inward “letting go” is not a mere preliminary purification but a direct trigger for the manifestation of tariki, the saving activity of Amitābha. Kato attributes decisive soteriological efficacy to what he calls “nothingness” (mu) and “true voidness and wondrous existence” (shinkū myōu). He understands renunciation as a method for cutting through fear, attachment, and discursive agitation so that the mind drops into this state of emptiness, which is not static but dynamic Buddha-nature. In this framework, relinquishment removes the occlusions that conceal the inherently salvific nature shared between the practitioner and Amitābha, enabling the “oneness of self and other” (jitai ichinyo) to emerge functionally. Thus, for Kato, the salvific force of Amitābha is not only external but is also the activity of the Buddha-nature revealed through renunciation. This turns Ippen's ascetic ideal into a psychospiritual process culminating in a responsive, mysterious power that intervenes in concrete life-situations.

Kato's reinterpretation of Ippen is paralleled by transformations in ritual and institutional practice at Shōjōkō-ji. The temple retains core Ji-shū practices such as distribution of fusan slips, odori nembutsu, and the ethos of itinerancy while also adapting them to modern forms more tailored to temple life and the lay community than the celibate itinerant asceticism of the early Ippen community.

== Practice ==
The Ji-shū sect is known for its recitation of nembutsu at certain intervals throughout the day, scheduled sessions of chanting (hence the name Ji-shū "Time sect"), the handing out of slips of paper with the nembutsu written on them (fuda), and keeping a register of the converted.

Ji monks also practice itinerant wandering (yugyō), traveling around the country staying at different places in order to spread the teachings.

== Bibliography ==
- Foard, James Harlan (1977). Ippen Shônin and popular Buddhism in Kamakura Japan, Dissertation, Stanford University. OCLC
- Foard, James Harlan (2006). The Pure Land Tradition: History and Development, Fremont, CA: Jain Publishing. ISBN 9780895810922. pp. 357–398
- Griffiths, Caitilin J. (2011). Tracing the Itinerant Path: Ji-shū Nuns of Medieval Japan, Thesis, University of Toronto
- Hirota, Dennis (1997). No Abode: The Record of Ippen, (Ryukoku-Ibs Studies in Buddhist Thought and Tradition), Honolulu: University of Hawaiʻi Press, ISBN 0824819977
- Kaufman, Laura S. (1992). Nature, Courtly Imagery, and Sacred Meaning in the Ippen Hijiri-e. In James H. Sanford (ed.), Flowing Traces Buddhism in the Literary and Visual Arts of Japan, Princeton, N.J.: Princeton University Press; pp. 47–75
- Matsunaga, Daigan, Matsunaga, Alicia (1996), Foundation of Japanese buddhism, Vol. 2: The Mass Movement (Kamakura and Muromachi Periods), Los Angeles; Tokyo: Buddhist Books International, 1996. ISBN 0-914910-28-0
- Thornton, S.A. (1999). Charisma and Community Formation in Medieval Japan: The Case of the Yugyo-ha (1300-1700). Cornell East Asia Series no. 102, Ithaca: Cornell University, ISBN 1-885445-62-8
- Dennis Hirota, No Abode: The Record of Ippen, University of Hawai'i Press, Honolulu, 1997 ISBN 978-0-8248-1997-2
- Daigan Lee Matsunaga and Alicia Orloff Matsunaga, Foundation of Japanese Buddhism. Vol. II: The Mass Movement (Kamakura & Muromachi Periods), Buddhist Books International, Los Angeles & Tōkyō, 1976 ISBN 978-0-914910-27-5
