= Higashiyama (surname) =

Higashiyama (東山) is a Japanese surname. People with the surname include:

- Kaii Higashiyama (1908–1999), Japanese painter and writer
- Noriyuki Higashiyama (born 1966), Japanese singer and actor
- Chieko Higashiyama (1890–1980), Japanese stage and film actress
- Tatsuki Higashiyama (born 1999), Japanese soccer player
- Mami Higashiyama (born 1977), Japanese actress and singer
- Hideo Higashiyama (born 1942), Japanese sprint canoer

== See also ==
- Emperor Higashiyama, 113th Emperor of Japan
