= November 28 =

November 28 this year in various calendars
- Saturday, 28 November 2026
Akan	Kurumemene
Armenian	11 Kʿaloch 1476
Aztec	Tlacaxipehualiztli 17, 11 Itzcuintli
Babylonian	17 Arakhsamna, 2337 SE
Balinese pawukon	Luang, Pepet, Pasah, Menala, Wage, Paniron, Saniscara of Kulantir, Yama, Urungan, Duka
Bengali	13 Ogrohayon, BS 1433
Chinese	Yang Fire Horse・Stomach Mansion; Fire Horse Year, Month 10, Day 20 (Xiaoxue, 9 days until Daxue)
Common Era	28 November 2026 CE
Coptic	19 Hathor, AM 1743
Egyptian	16 Pharmuthi, 2775 NE
Ethiopian	19 H̱edār, 2019 Amätä Məhrät
French Republican	Décade I, Septidi de Frimaire de l'Année 235 de la République
Gregorian	28 November, AD 2026
Hebrew	18 Kislev, AM 5787
Hindu	Punarvasu・Śubha; Solar: 12 Mārgaśīrṣa, 1948 SE; Lunisolar: Caturthī, Kṛishna pakṣa of Kārtika, 2083 VE; Rāudra・5127 KY・1,872,907
Icelandic	Laugardagur, 6 Ýlir 2026
Islamic	17 Jumada al-thani, AH 1448 (using tabular method)
ISO week date	2026-W48-6
Japanese	20 Kannazuki, Reiwa 8 (Shōsetsu, 9 days until Taisetsu)
Julian	15 November, AD 2026 (AM 7535)
Julian day	2461373
Korean	20 Dwaejidal, 4359 DE
Maya	13.0.14.2.10; 3 Mac, 11 Oc
Roman	ante diem XVII Kalendas Decembres, MMDCCLXXIX AUC
Solar Hijri	7 Azar, SH 1405
Tibetan	19 smin drug, me pho rta 2153 or 1772 or 1000

<<	November					>>
Su	Mo	Tu	We	Th	Fr	Sa
1	2	3	4	5	6	7
8	9	10	11	12	13	14
15	16	17	18	19	20	21
22	23	24	25	26	27	28
29	30
2026

November 28 in recent years
2025 (Friday)
2024 (Thursday)
2023 (Tuesday)
2022 (Monday)
2021 (Sunday)
2020 (Saturday)
2019 (Thursday)
2018 (Wednesday)
2017 (Tuesday)
2016 (Monday)

November 28 is the 332nd day of the year (333rd in leap years) in the Gregorian calendar; 33 days remain until the end of the year.

== Events ==
=== Pre-1600 ===
- 587 – Treaty of Andelot: King Guntram of Burgundy recognizes Childebert II as his heir.
- 936 – Shi Jingtang is enthroned as the first emperor of the Later Jin by Emperor Taizong of Liao, following a revolt against Emperor Fei of Later Tang.
- 1240 – Mongol troops under Batu Khan begin with the siege of Kiev.
- 1443 – Skanderbeg and his forces liberate Kruja in central Albania and raise the Albanian flag.
- 1470 – Champa–Đại Việt War: Emperor Lê Thánh Tông of Đại Việt formally launches his attack against Champa.
- 1520 – After 38 days, an expedition under the command of Ferdinand Magellan completes the first passage through the Strait of Magellan and enters the Pacific Ocean.
- 1582 – In Stratford-upon-Avon, William Shakespeare and Anne Hathaway pay a £40 (equivalent to £13,818 in 2025) bond in lieu of posting wedding banns, which enables them to marry immediately.

=== 1601–1900 ===
- 1627 – The Polish–Lithuanian Commonwealth Navy has its greatest and last naval victory in the Battle of Oliwa.
- 1660 – At Gresham College, twelve men, including Christopher Wren, Robert Boyle, John Wilkins, and Sir Robert Moray decide to found what is later known as the Royal Society.
- 1666 – At least 3,000 men of the Royal Scots Army led by Tam Dalyell of the Binns defeat about 900 Covenanter insurgents led by James Wallace of Auchens in the Battle of Rullion Green.
- 1785 – The first Treaty of Hopewell is signed, by which the United States acknowledges Cherokee lands in what is now East Tennessee.
- 1798 – Trade between the United States and modern-day Uruguay begins when John Leamy's frigate John arrives in Montevideo.
- 1811 – Beethoven's Piano Concerto No. 5 in E-flat major, Op. 73, premieres at the Gewandhaus in Leipzig.
- 1814 – The Times of London becomes the first newspaper to be produced on a steam-powered printing press, built by the German team of Koenig & Bauer.
- 1821 – Panama Independence Day: Panama separates from Spain and joins Gran Colombia.
- 1843 – Ka Lā Hui (Hawaiian Independence Day): The Kingdom of Hawaii is officially recognized by the United Kingdom and France as an independent nation.
- 1855 – Russian forces under general Nikolay Muravyov-Karsky capture the strategic fortress of Kars from the Ottoman Empire.
- 1861 – American Civil War: The Confederate States of America accept a rival state government's pronouncement that declares Missouri to be the 12th state of the Confederacy.
- 1862 – American Civil War: In the Battle of Cane Hill, Union troops under General James G. Blunt defeat General John Marmaduke's Confederates.
- 1862 – Notts County F.C. is founded in Nottingham, England, making it the oldest professional Association football club in the world.
- 1885 – Bulgarian victory in the Serbo-Bulgarian War preserves the Unification of Bulgaria.
- 1893 – Women's suffrage in New Zealand concludes with the 1893 New Zealand general election.
- 1895 – The first American automobile race takes place over the 54 miles from Chicago's Jackson Park to Evanston, Illinois. Frank Duryea wins in approximately 10 hours.
- 1899 – The Second Boer War: A British column is engaged by Boer forces at the Battle of Modder River; although the Boers withdraw, the British suffer heavy casualties.

=== 1901–present ===
- 1905 – Irish nationalist Arthur Griffith founds Sinn Féin as a political party with the main aim of establishing a dual monarchy in Ireland.
- 1908 – A mine explosion in Marianna, Pennsylvania, kills 154 men, leaving only one survivor.
- 1912 – Albania declares its independence from the Ottoman Empire.
- 1914 – World War I: Following a war-induced closure in July, the New York Stock Exchange re-opens for bond trading.
- 1917 – The Estonian Provincial Assembly declares itself the sovereign power of Estonia.
- 1918 – The Soviet Forces move against Estonia when the 6th Red Rifle Division strikes the border town of Narva, marking the beginning of the Estonian War of Independence.
- 1919 – Lady Astor is elected as a Member of the Parliament of the United Kingdom. She is the first woman to sit in the House of Commons. (Countess Markievicz, the first to be elected, refused to sit.)
- 1920 – FIDAC (The Interallied Federation of War Veterans Organisations), the first international organization of war veterans is established in Paris, France.
- 1920 – Irish War of Independence: Kilmichael Ambush: The Irish Republican Army ambush a convoy of British Auxiliaries and kill seventeen.
- 1925 – The Grand Ole Opry begins broadcasting in Nashville, Tennessee, as the WSM Barn Dance.
- 1942 – In Boston, Massachusetts, a fire in the Cocoanut Grove nightclub kills 492 people.
- 1943 – World War II: Tehran Conference: U.S. President Franklin D. Roosevelt, British Prime Minister Winston Churchill and Soviet Premier Joseph Stalin meet in Tehran, Iran, to discuss war strategy.
- 1958 – Chad, the Republic of the Congo, and Gabon become autonomous republics within the French Community.
- 1958 – First successful flight of SM-65 Atlas; the first operational intercontinental ballistic missile (ICBM), developed by the United States and the first member of the Atlas rocket family.
- 1960 – Mauritania becomes independent of France.
- 1964 – Mariner program: NASA launches the Mariner 4 probe toward Mars.
- 1964 – Vietnam War: National Security Council members agree to recommend that U.S. President Lyndon B. Johnson adopt a plan for a two-stage escalation of bombing in North Vietnam.
- 1965 – Vietnam War: In response to U.S. President Lyndon B. Johnson's call for "more flags" in Vietnam, Philippine President-elect Ferdinand Marcos announces he will send troops to help fight in South Vietnam.
- 1966 – Michel Micombero overthrows the monarchy of Burundi and makes himself the first president.
- 1967 – The first pulsar (PSR B1919+21, in the constellation of Vulpecula) is discovered by two astronomers Jocelyn Bell Burnell and Antony Hewish.
- 1971 – Fred Quilt, a leader of the Tsilhqot'in First Nation suffers severe abdominal injuries allegedly caused by Royal Canadian Mounted Police officers; he dies two days later.
- 1971 – Wasfi al-Tal, Prime Minister of Jordan, is assassinated by the Black September unit of the Palestine Liberation Organization.
- 1972 – Last executions in Paris: Claude Buffet and Roger Bontems are guillotined at La Santé Prison.
- 1975 – Timor-Leste declares its independence from Portugal.
- 1979 – Air New Zealand Flight 901, a DC-10 sightseeing flight over Antarctica, crashes into Mount Erebus, killing all 257 people on board.
- 1980 – Iran–Iraq War: Operation Morvarid: The bulk of the Iraqi Navy is destroyed by the Iranian Navy in the Persian Gulf. (Commemorated in Iran as Navy Day.)
- 1983 – Space Shuttle Columbia is launched on STS-9, the first mission to carry the European Space Agency's Spacelab module.
- 1987 – South African Airways Flight 295 crashes into the Indian Ocean, killing all 159 people on board.
- 1989 – Cold War: Velvet Revolution: In the face of protests, the Communist Party of Czechoslovakia announces it will give up its monopoly on political power.
- 1990 – British Prime Minister Margaret Thatcher resigns as leader of the Conservative Party and, therefore, as Prime Minister. She is succeeded in both positions by John Major.
- 1991 – South Ossetia declares independence from Georgia.
- 2002 – Suicide bombers blow up an Israeli-owned hotel in Mombasa, Kenya; their colleagues fail in their attempt to bring down Arkia Israel Airlines Flight 582 with surface-to-air missiles.
- 2014 – Gunmen set off three bombs at the central mosque in the northern Nigerian city of Kano killing at least 120 people.
- 2016 – LaMia Flight 2933 crashes near Medellín, Colombia, killing 71 of 77 people on board, including members of the Brazilian football club Chapecoense
- 2020 – Over seven hundred civilians are massacred by the Ethiopian National Defense Force and Eritrean Army in Aksum, Ethiopia.

== Births ==
=== Pre-1600 ===
- 1118 – Manuel I Komnenos, Byzantine emperor (died 1180)
- 1293 – Yesün Temür, Chinese emperor (died 1328)
- 1470 – Wen Zhengming, artist during the Ming dynasty (died 1559)
- 1489 – Margaret Tudor, Queen of Scotland, wife of James IV of Scotland, daughter of Henry VII of England (died 1541)
- 1570 – James Whitelocke, English judge and politician, Chief Justice of Chester (died 1632)
- 1592 – Hong Taiji, Emperor of China (died 1643)
- 1598 – Hans Nansen, Danish lawyer and politician (died 1667)

=== 1601–1900 ===
- 1628 – John Bunyan, English preacher, theologian, and author (died 1688)
- 1631 – Abraham Brueghel, Flemish Baroque painter (died 1690)
- 1632 – Jean-Baptiste Lully, Italian-French composer and manager (died 1687)
- 1640 – Willem de Vlamingh, Flemish captain and explorer (died 1698)
- 1661 – Edward Hyde, 3rd Earl of Clarendon, English soldier and politician, 14th Colonial Governor of New York (died 1723)
- 1681 – Jean Cavalier, French rebel leader (died 1740)
- 1682 – Betty Parris, woman from Salem in Massachusetts who accused others of being witches (died 1760)
- 1694 – Leopold, Prince of Anhalt-Köthen (died 1728)
- 1700 – Nathaniel Bliss, English astronomer and mathematician (died 1764)
- 1700 – Sophie Magdalene of Brandenburg-Kulmbach (died 1770)
- 1757 – William Blake, English poet and painter (died 1827)
- 1760 – Maria Teresa Poniatowska, Polish noblewoman (died 1834)
- 1772 – Luke Howard, English chemist and meteorologist (died 1864)
- 1774 – Maria Antonia of Parma (died 1841)
- 1785 – Victor de Broglie, French lawyer and politician, 9th Prime Minister of France (died 1870)
- 1792 – Victor Cousin, French philosopher and academic (died 1867)
- 1793 – Carl Jonas Love Almqvist, Swedish poet, composer, and critic (died 1866)
- 1804 – William Weston, English-Australian politician, 3rd Premier of Tasmania (died 1888)
- 1805 – John Lloyd Stephens, American archaeologist and explorer (died 1852)
- 1810 – William Froude, English engineer and architect (died 1879)
- 1820 – Friedrich Engels, German-English philosopher, economist, and journalist (died 1895)
- 1829 – Anton Rubinstein, Russian pianist, composer, and conductor (died 1894)
- 1837 – John Wesley Hyatt, American engineer (died 1920)
- 1853 – Helen Magill White, American academic (died 1944)
- 1857 – Alfonso XII of Spain (died 1885)
- 1861 – Adina Emilia De Zavala, American teacher, historian and preservationist of Texas history (died 1955)
- 1864 – James Allen, English author and poet (died 1912)
- 1864 – Lindley Miller Garrison, American lawyer and politician, 46th United States Secretary of War (died 1932)
- 1866 – Henry Bacon, American architect, designed the Lincoln Memorial (died 1924)
- 1876 – Bert Vogler, South African cricketer (died 1946)
- 1880 – Alexander Blok, Russian poet and playwright (died 1921)
- 1881 – Stefan Zweig, Austrian author, playwright, and journalist (died 1942)
- 1887 – Ernst Röhm, German soldier and politician (died 1934)
- 1891 – Gregorio Perfecto, Filipino journalist, jurist, and politician (died 1949)
- 1891 – Mabel Alvarez, American painter (died 1985)
- 1894 – Brooks Atkinson, American theatre critic (died 1984)
- 1894 – Henry Hazlitt, American economist and philosopher (died 1993)
- 1895 – José Iturbi, Spanish pianist and conductor (died 1980)
- 1896 – Dawn Powell, American author and playwright (died 1965)
- 1896 – Lilia Skala, Austrian-American actress (died 1994)
- 1898 – İhap Hulusi Görey, Turkish graphic artist (died 1986)
- 1900 – Mary Bothwell, Canadian classical vocalist and painter (died 1985)

=== 1901–present ===
- 1903 – Gladys O'Connor, English-Canadian actress (died 2012)
- 1904 – James Eastland, American planter and politician (died 1986)
- 1904 – Nancy Mitford, English journalist and author (died 1973)
- 1906 – Henry Picard, American golfer (died 1997)
- 1907 – Rose Bampton, American soprano and educator (died 2007)
- 1907 – Alberto Moravia, Italian journalist and author (died 1990)
- 1908 – Michael Adekunle Ajasin, Nigerian educator and politician, 3rd Governor of Ondo State (died 1997)
- 1908 – Claude Lévi-Strauss, Belgian-French anthropologist and ethnologist (died 2009)
- 1910 – Elsie Quarterman, American ecologist and academic (died 2014)
- 1911 – Václav Renč, Czech poet and playwright (died 1973)
- 1912 – Morris Louis, American painter (died 1962)
- 1913 – Cliff Addison, English chemist and academic (died 1994)
- 1915 – Evald Okas, Estonian painter and academic (died 2011)
- 1915 – Yves Thériault, Canadian author (died 1983)
- 1916 – Lilian, Princess of Réthy (died 2002)
- 1916 – Ramón José Velásquez, Venezuelan journalist, lawyer, and politician, President of Venezuela (died 2014)
- 1919 – Keith Miller, Australian cricketer, footballer, and pilot (died 2004)
- 1923 – Helen Delich Bentley, American politician (died 2016)
- 1923 – Gloria Grahame, American actress (died 1981)
- 1924 – Dennis Brutus, South African journalist, poet, and academic (died 2009)
- 1924 – Johanna Döbereiner, Czech-Brazilian agronomist and academic (died 2000)
- 1925 – József Bozsik, Hungarian footballer and manager (died 1978)
- 1925 – Gigi Gryce, American saxophonist and composer (died 1983)
- 1926 – Lawrence Turman, American film producer (died 2023)
- 1927 – Abdul Halim of Kedah, Yang di-Pertuan Agong of Malaysia (died 2017)
- 1928 – Arthur Melvin Okun, American economist and academic (died 1980)
- 1928 – Piet Steenbergen, Dutch footballer and manager (died 2010)
- 1929 – Berry Gordy, American songwriter and producer, founded Motown Records
- 1930 – A.L. "Doodle" Owens, American country music songwriter and singer (died 1999)
- 1932 – Gato Barbieri, Argentinian saxophonist and composer (died 2016)
- 1932 – Terence Frisby, English author and playwright (died 2020)
- 1933 – Joe Knollenberg, American soldier and politician (died 2018)
- 1933 – Hope Lange, American actress (died 2003)
- 1935 – Frik du Preez, South African rugby player
- 1935 – Randolph Stow, Australian-English author and poet (died 2010)
- 1936 – Gary Hart, American lawyer and politician, 6th United States Special Envoy for Northern Ireland
- 1938 – Peter Dimond, Australian rugby league player (died 2021)
- 1940 – Bruce Channel, American singer-songwriter
- 1941 – Laura Antonelli, Italian actress (died 2015)
- 1942 – Paul Warfield, American football player and sportscaster
- 1943 – R. B. Greaves, Guyanese-American singer-songwriter (died 2012)
- 1943 – Randy Newman, American singer-songwriter, composer, and pianist
- 1943 – Susan Brookes, British television chef and food writer
- 1944 – Rita Mae Brown, American novelist, poet, and screenwriter
- 1945 – Franklin Drilon, Filipino lawyer and politician, 22nd President of the Senate of the Philippines
- 1946 – Joe Dante, American director and producer
- 1947 – Michel Berger, French singer-songwriter (died 1992)
- 1947 – Maria Farantouri, Greek singer and politician
- 1947 – Gladys Kokorwe, Botswana politician and Speaker of The National Assembly
- 1948 – Beeb Birtles, Dutch-Australian singer-songwriter and guitarist
- 1948 – Mick Channon, English footballer and horse trainer
- 1948 – Agnieszka Holland, Polish film and television director and screenwriter
- 1948 – Alan Lightman, American physicist, novelist, and academician
- 1948 – Dick Morris, American political consultant, journalist, and author
- 1949 – Alexander Godunov, Russian-American actor and dancer (died 1995)
- 1949 – Paul Shaffer, Canadian-American singer, keyboard player, and bandleader
- 1950 – Ed Harris, American actor and producer
- 1950 – Russell Alan Hulse, American physicist and astronomer, Nobel Prize laureate
- 1951 – Barbara Morgan, American educator and astronaut
- 1952 – S. Epatha Merkerson, American actress
- 1953 – Alistair Darling, British lawyer and politician, Chancellor of the Exchequer (died 2023)
- 1953 – Helen De Michiel, American director and producer
- 1953 – Sixto Lezcano, Puerto Rican-American baseball player and coach
- 1953 – Gordon Marsden, English journalist and politician
- 1954 – Necip Hablemitoğlu, Turkish historian and academic (died 2002)
- 1955 – Alessandro Altobelli, Italian footballer and sportscaster
- 1955 – Adem Jashari, Kosovan commander (died 1998)
- 1956 – Fiona Armstrong, English-Scottish journalist and author
- 1956 – David Van Day, English singer
- 1957 – Peeter Järvelaid, Estonian historian and scholar
- 1958 – Kriss Akabusi, English sprinter and hurdler
- 1958 – Dave Righetti, American baseball player and coach
- 1959 – Miki Matsubara, Japanese composer, lyricist, and singer (died 2004)
- 1959 – Nancy Charest, Canadian lawyer and politician (died 2014)
- 1959 – Judd Nelson, American actor and screenwriter
- 1959 – Stephen Roche, Irish cyclist and sportscaster
- 1960 – Jorge Domecq, Spanish lawyer and diplomat
- 1960 – John Galliano, Gibraltar-born British fashion designer
- 1960 – Andy Ritchie, English footballer and manager
- 1960 – Kenny Wharton, English footballer and coach
- 1961 – Martin Clunes, English actor, singer, and director
- 1961 – Alfonso Cuarón, Mexican director, producer, and screenwriter
- 1961 – Klaus Köchl, Austrian politician
- 1962 – Matt Cameron, American drummer and songwriter
- 1962 – Juan Carlos Rosero, Ecuadorian cyclist (died 2013)
- 1962 – Jane Sibbett, American actress
- 1962 – Jon Stewart, American comedian, actor, and television host
- 1963 – Armando Iannucci, Scottish comedian, actor, director, and producer
- 1963 – Andrew Jones, English politician
- 1963 – Johnny Newman, American basketball player
- 1963 – Walt Weiss, American baseball player and manager
- 1964 – Michael Bennet, Indian-American lawyer and politician
- 1964 – John Burkett, American baseball player and bowler
- 1964 – Roy Tarpley, American basketball player (died 2015)
- 1964 – Sian Williams, English-Welsh journalist
- 1965 – Erwin Mortier, Belgian author and poet
- 1965 – Matt Williams, American baseball player and manager
- 1966 – Garcelle Beauvais, Haitian-American actress
- 1966 – Sam Seder, American actor and political commentator
- 1967 – José del Solar, Peruvian footballer and manager
- 1967 – Chris Heaton-Harris, English businessman and politician
- 1967 – Anna Nicole Smith, American model, actress, and television personality (died 2007)
- 1967 – Stephnie Weir, American actress and comedian
- 1968 – Darren Bett, English journalist
- 1969 – Nick Knight, English cricketer and sportscaster
- 1969 – Robb Nen, American baseball player and manager
- 1969 – Valeri Nikitin, Estonian wrestler
- 1969 – Sonia O'Sullivan, Irish athlete
- 1970 – Álex López Morón, Spanish tennis player
- 1970 – Richard Osman, English television host, director, and producer
- 1972 – Paulo Figueiredo, Angolan footballer
- 1972 – Anastasia Kelesidou, German-Greek discus thrower
- 1972 – Jesper Strömblad, Swedish guitarist and songwriter
- 1973 – Jade Puget, American guitarist and producer
- 1973 – Gina Tognoni, American actress
- 1974 – apl.de.ap, Filipino-American singer and rapper
- 1974 – András Tölcséres, Hungarian footballer and manager
- 1975 – Bakarhythm, Japanese comedian, actor, playwright, and composer
- 1975 – Eka Kurniawan, Indonesian journalist and author
- 1975 – Park Sung-bae, South Korean footballer
- 1975 – Takashi Shimoda, Japanese footballer
- 1975 – Sigurd Wongraven, Norwegian singer-songwriter, guitarist, and producer
- 1976 – Ryan Kwanten, Australian actor
- 1977 – Marlon Broomes, English footballer
- 1977 – Fabio Grosso, Italian footballer and manager
- 1977 – Acer Nethercott, English rower (died 2013)
- 1977 – Gavin Rae, Scottish footballer
- 1977 – Greg Somerville, New Zealand rugby player
- 1977 – DeMya Walker, American basketball player
- 1978 – Brent Albright, American wrestler
- 1978 – Darryl Flahavan, English footballer
- 1978 – Aimee Garcia, American actress and writer
- 1978 – Freddie Mitchell, American football player
- 1978 – Mehdi Nafti, Tunisian footballer
- 1978 – Michael Simpkins, English footballer
- 1978 – Haytham Tambal, Sudanese footballer
- 1979 – Jaroslav Balaštík, Czech ice hockey player
- 1979 – Chamillionaire, American rapper, entrepreneur, and investor
- 1979 – Shy FX, English DJ and producer
- 1979 – Daniel Henney, American actor and model
- 1979 – Katarzyna Strączy, Polish tennis player
- 1980 – Lisa Middelhauve, German singer-songwriter
- 1980 – Stuart Taylor, English footballer
- 1981 – Erick Rowan, American wrestler
- 1981 – Brian Tevreden, Dutch footballer
- 1982 – Leandro Barbosa, Brazilian basketball player
- 1982 – Chris Harris, English motorcycle racer
- 1982 – Alan Ritchson, American actor, model, singer, and songwriter
- 1982 – Raido Villers, Estonian basketball player
- 1983 – Rostam Batmanglij, American musician and songwriter
- 1983 – Tyler Glenn, American singer-songwriter and keyboard player
- 1983 – Summer Rae, American football player, wrestler, and actress
- 1983 – Édouard Roger-Vasselin, French tennis player
- 1983 – Nelson Valdez, Paraguayan footballer
- 1983 – Carlos Villanueva, Dominican baseball player
- 1984 – Andrew Bogut, Australian basketball player
- 1984 – Marc-André Fleury, Canadian ice hockey player
- 1984 – Trey Songz, American R&B singer-songwriter and actor
- 1984 – Mary Elizabeth Winstead, American actress and producer
- 1984 – Naoko Yamada, Japanese anime director
- 1985 – Mike Kostka, Canadian ice hockey player
- 1985 – Álvaro Pereira, Uruguayan footballer
- 1986 – Mouhamadou Dabo, French footballer
- 1986 – Taurean Green, American-Georgian basketball player
- 1987 – Karen Gillan, Scottish actress
- 1987 – Craig Kieswetter, South African-English cricketer and golfer
- 1988 – Joe Cole, English actor
- 1988 – Scarlett Pomers, American actress and singer-songwriter
- 1989 – Laura Alleway, Australian footballer
- 1989 – Jamie Buhrer, Australian rugby league player
- 1989 – Jesús Montero, Venezuelan baseball player (died 2025)
- 1990 – Dedryck Boyata, Belgian footballer
- 1990 – Bradley Smith, English motorcycle racer
- 1992 – Adam Hicks, American actor
- 1992 – Jarvis Landry, American football player
- 1992 – Jake Miller, American singer-songwriter
- 1993 – Bryshere Y. Gray, American actor and rapper
- 1993 – David Nofoaluma, Australian-Samoan rugby league player
- 1994 – Nao Hibino, Japanese tennis player
- 1995 – Chase Elliott, American race car driver
- 1997 – Mostafa Mohamed, Egyptian footballer
- 1999 – Trey Jemison, American basketball player
- 2000 – Jackson Yee, Chinese singer, dancer and actor

== Deaths ==
=== Pre-1600 ===
- 741 – Pope Gregory III
- 939 – Lady Ma, Chinese noblewoman (born 890)
- 1039 – Adalbero, duke of Carinthia (born 980)
- 1122 – Margrave Ottokar II of Styria
- 1170 – Owain Gwynedd, Welsh king (born 1080)
- 1290 – Eleanor of Castile, Queen Consort of England, Countess of Ponthieu (born 1241)
- 1317 – Yishan Yining, Zen monk and writer from China who taught in Japan (born 1247)
- 1476 – James of the Marches, Franciscan friar
- 1499 – Edward Plantagenet, 17th Earl of Warwick (born 1475)
- 1574 – Georg Major, German theologian and educator (born 1502)
- 1585 – Hernando Franco, Spanish composer (born 1532)

=== 1601–1900 ===
- 1667 – Jean de Thévenot, French linguist and botanist (born 1633)
- 1675 – Basil Feilding, 2nd Earl of Denbigh, English soldier and politician (born 1608)
- 1675 – Leonard Hoar, English minister and academic (born 1630)
- 1680 – Gian Lorenzo Bernini, Italian sculptor and painter (born 1598)
- 1680 – Giovanni Francesco Grimaldi, Italian painter and architect (born 1606)
- 1680 – Athanasius Kircher, German priest, philologist, and scholar (born 1601)
- 1694 – Matsuo Bashō, Japanese poet and scholar (born 1644)
- 1695 – Giovanni Paolo Colonna, Italian organist, composer, and educator (born 1637)
- 1695 – Anthony Wood, English historian and author (born 1632)
- 1698 – Louis de Buade de Frontenac, French soldier and politician, 3rd Governor General of New France (born 1622)
- 1763 – Naungdawgyi, Burmese king (born 1734)
- 1785 – William Whipple, American general and politician (born 1730)
- 1794 – Friedrich Wilhelm von Steuben, Prussian-American general (born 1730)
- 1794 – Sir James Tylney-Long, 7th Baronet, English politician (born 1736)
- 1801 – Déodat Gratet de Dolomieu, French geologist and academic (born 1750)
- 1815 – Johann Peter Salomon, German violinist, composer, and conductor (born 1745)
- 1852 – Ludger Duvernay, French journalist and politician (born 1799)
- 1852 – Emmanuil Xanthos, Greek activist, co-founded Filiki Eteria (born 1772)
- 1859 – Washington Irving, American short story writer, essayist, biographer, historian (born 1783)
- 1870 – Frédéric Bazille, French soldier and painter (born 1841)
- 1873 – Caterina Scarpellini, Italian astronomer and meteorologist (born 1808)
- 1878 – Orson Hyde, American religious leader, 3rd President of the Quorum of the Twelve Apostles (born 1805)
- 1880 – Aires de Ornelas e Vasconcelos, Portuguese archbishop (born 1837)
- 1890 – Jyotirao Phule, Indian philosopher and activist (born 1827)
- 1891 – Sir James Corry, 1st Baronet, British politician (born 1826)
- 1893 – Talbot Baines Reed, English author (born 1852)

=== 1901–present ===
- 1901 – Moses Dickson, African-American abolitionist, soldier, minister, and founder of The Knights of Liberty (born 1824)
- 1904 – Hermann de Pourtalès, Swiss sailor (born 1847)
- 1907 – Stanisław Wyspiański, Polish playwright, poet, and painter (born 1869)
- 1912 – Walter Benona Sharp, American businessman (born 1870)
- 1917 – Mikelis Avlichos, Greek poet and scholar (born 1844)
- 1921 – ʻAbdu'l-Bahá, Head of the Baháʼí Faith (born 1844)
- 1930 – Constantine VI of Constantinople (born 1859)
- 1935 – Erich von Hornbostel, Austrian musicologist and scholar (born 1877)
- 1939 – James Naismith, Canadian-American physician and educator, created basketball (born 1861)
- 1943 – Aleksander Hellat, Estonian lawyer and politician, 6th Estonian Minister of Foreign Affairs (born 1881)
- 1945 – Dwight F. Davis, American tennis player and politician, 49th United States Secretary of War (born 1879)
- 1947 – Philippe Leclerc de Hauteclocque, French general (born 1902)
- 1953 – Frank Olson, American biologist and chemist (born 1910)
- 1954 – Enrico Fermi, Italian-American physicist and academic, Nobel Prize laureate (born 1901)
- 1960 – Dirk Jan de Geer, Dutch lawyer and politician, Prime Minister of the Netherlands (born 1870)
- 1960 – Tsunenohana Kan'ichi, Japanese sumo wrestler, the 31st Yokozuna (born 1896)
- 1960 – Richard Wright, American novelist, short story writer, essayist, and poet (born 1908)
- 1962 – K. C. Dey, Indian singer-songwriter and actor (born 1893)
- 1962 – Wilhelmina of the Netherlands (born 1880)
- 1968 – Enid Blyton, English author and poet (born 1897)
- 1971 – Wasfi al-Tal, Jordanian captain and politician, 34th Prime Minister of Jordan (born 1920)
- 1972 – Havergal Brian, English composer (born 1875)
- 1973 – Marthe Bibesco, Romanian-French author and poet (born 1886)
- 1975 – Peder Furubotn, Norwegian Communist and anti-Nazi Resistance leader (born 1890)
- 1976 – Rosalind Russell, American actress and singer (born 1907)
- 1977 – Bob Meusel, American baseball player and sailor (born 1896)
- 1978 – Antonio Vespucio Liberti, Argentinian businessman (born 1902)
- 1982 – Helen of Greece and Denmark (born 1896)
- 1983 – Christopher George, American actor (born 1929)
- 1987 – Choh Hao Li, Chinese-American biologist and chemist (born 1913)
- 1987 – Kazuharu Sonoda, Japanese wrestler (born 1956)
- 1992 – Sidney Nolan, Australian-English painter and academic (born 1917)
- 1993 – Jerry Edmonton, Canadian-American drummer (born 1946)
- 1993 – Garry Moore, American comedian, television personality, and game show host (born 1915)
- 1994 – Jeffrey Dahmer, American serial killer (born 1960)
- 1994 – Buster Edwards, English boxer and criminal (born 1932)
- 1994 – Jerry Rubin, American businessman and activist (born 1938)
- 1995 – Joe Kelly, Irish race car driver (born 1915)
- 1997 – Georges Marchal, French actor (born 1920)
- 1998 – Kerry Wendell Thornley, American soldier and author (born 1938)
- 1998 – Rita Hester, American transgender woman (born 1963)
- 2001 – Kal Mann, American songwriter (born 1917)
- 2001 – William Reid, Scottish lieutenant and pilot, Victoria Cross recipient (born 1921)
- 2002 – Melih Cevdet Anday, Turkish poet and author (born 1915)
- 2003 – Ted Bates, English footballer and manager (born 1918)
- 2003 – Antonia Forest, English author (born 1915)
- 2003 – Mihkel Mathiesen, Estonian engineer and politician (born 1918)
- 2005 – Marc Lawrence, American actor, director, producer, and screenwriter (born 1910)
- 2005 – Jack Concannon, American football player and actor (born 1943)
- 2007 – Gudrun Wagner, Prussian director and producer (born 1944)
- 2008 – Havaldar Gajender Singh, Indian sergeant (born 1972)
- 2008 – Sandeep Unnikrishnan, Indian soldier (born 1977)
- 2009 – Gilles Carle, Canadian director, producer, and screenwriter (born 1928)
- 2010 – Leslie Nielsen, Canadian-American actor and producer (born 1926)
- 2011 – Lloyd J. Old, American immunologist and academic (born 1933)
- 2012 – Knut Ahnlund, Swedish historian, author, and academic (born 1923)
- 2012 – Spain Rodriguez, American illustrator (born 1940)
- 2012 – Franco Ventriglia, American opera singer (born 1922)
- 2012 – Zig Ziglar, American soldier and author (born 1926)
- 2013 – Jack Matthews, American author, playwright, and academic (born 1925)
- 2013 – Mitja Ribičič, Italian-Slovenian soldier and politician, 25th Prime Minister of Yugoslavia (born 1919)
- 2013 – Jean-Louis Roux, Canadian actor and politician, 34th Lieutenant Governor of Quebec (born 1923)
- 2013 – Beyle Schaechter-Gottesman, Austrian-American poet and songwriter (born 1920)
- 2014 – Chespirito, Mexican actor, director, producer, and screenwriter (born 1929)
- 2014 – Said Akl, Lebanese poet, playwright, and linguist (born 1912)
- 2014 – Dale Armstrong, Canadian race car driver (born 1941)
- 2015 – Wayne Bickerton, Welsh songwriter and producer (born 1941)
- 2015 – Luc Bondy, Swiss director and producer (born 1948)
- 2015 – Gerry Byrne, English-Welsh footballer (born 1938)
- 2015 – Marjorie Lord, American actress (born 1918)
- 2015 – Olene Walker, American lawyer and politician, 15th Governor of Utah (born 1930)
- 2018 – Harry Leslie Smith, British writer and political commentator (born 1923)
- 2020 – David Prowse, English weight-lifting champion, actor and Green Cross Man (born 1935)
- 2021 – Virgil Abloh, American fashion designer and entrepreneur (born 1980)
- 2021 – Frank Williams, British founder of Williams Grand Prix Engineering (born 1942)
- 2023 – Charlie Munger, American businessman and vice chairman of Berkshire Hathaway (born 1924)
- 2024 – Prince Johnson, Liberian politician (born 1952)
- 2024 – Ananda Krishnan, Malaysian businessman (born 1938)
- 2024 – Silvia Pinal, Mexican actress (born 1931)
- 2024 – Kioumars Pourhashemi, Iranian military general

== Holidays and observances ==
- Independence Day, celebrating the independence of Albania from Turkey in 1912, the first Albanian flag raise by Skanderbeg in 1443, and for the new parliamentary constitution in 1998.
- Bedfordshire day is celebrated in the county of Bedfordshire to celebrate the birth of John Bunyan
- Bukovina Day (Romania)
- Christian feast day:
  - Acacius, Hirenarchus, and companions, of Sebaste
  - Catherine Labouré
  - Feast of the Holy Sovereigns (Episcopal Diocese of Hawaii)
  - Herman of Alaska, the anniversary of his actual death. Eastern Orthodox
  - James of the Marches
  - Kamehameha and Emma (Episcopal Church (USA))
  - Our Lady of Kibeho
  - Stephen the Younger
  - November 28 (Eastern Orthodox liturgics)
- Heroes' Day (Sri Lanka)
- Hōonkō (Japan)
- Independence Day (Mauritania), celebrate the independence of Mauritania from France in 1960.
- Independence Day (Panama), celebrate the independence of Panama from Spain in 1821.
- Navy Day (Iran)
- Proclamation of Independence Day (Timor-Leste), celebrating the declaration of independence of the Democratic Republic of East Timor from Portugal in 1975.
- Republic Day (Burundi)
- Republic Day (Chad)
