= Raido (given name) =

Estonian male given name

- Gender: Male
- Language: Estonian
- Name day: 9 December

Origin
- Region of origin: Estonia

Raido is an Estonian-language male given name.

People named Raido include:

- Raido Kodanipork (born 1969), Estonian cyclist
- Raido Ränkel (born 1990), Estonian cross-country skier
- Raido Rüütel (born 1951), Estonian racing driver
- Raido Villers (born 1982), Estonian basketball player
