= Rüütel =

Family name

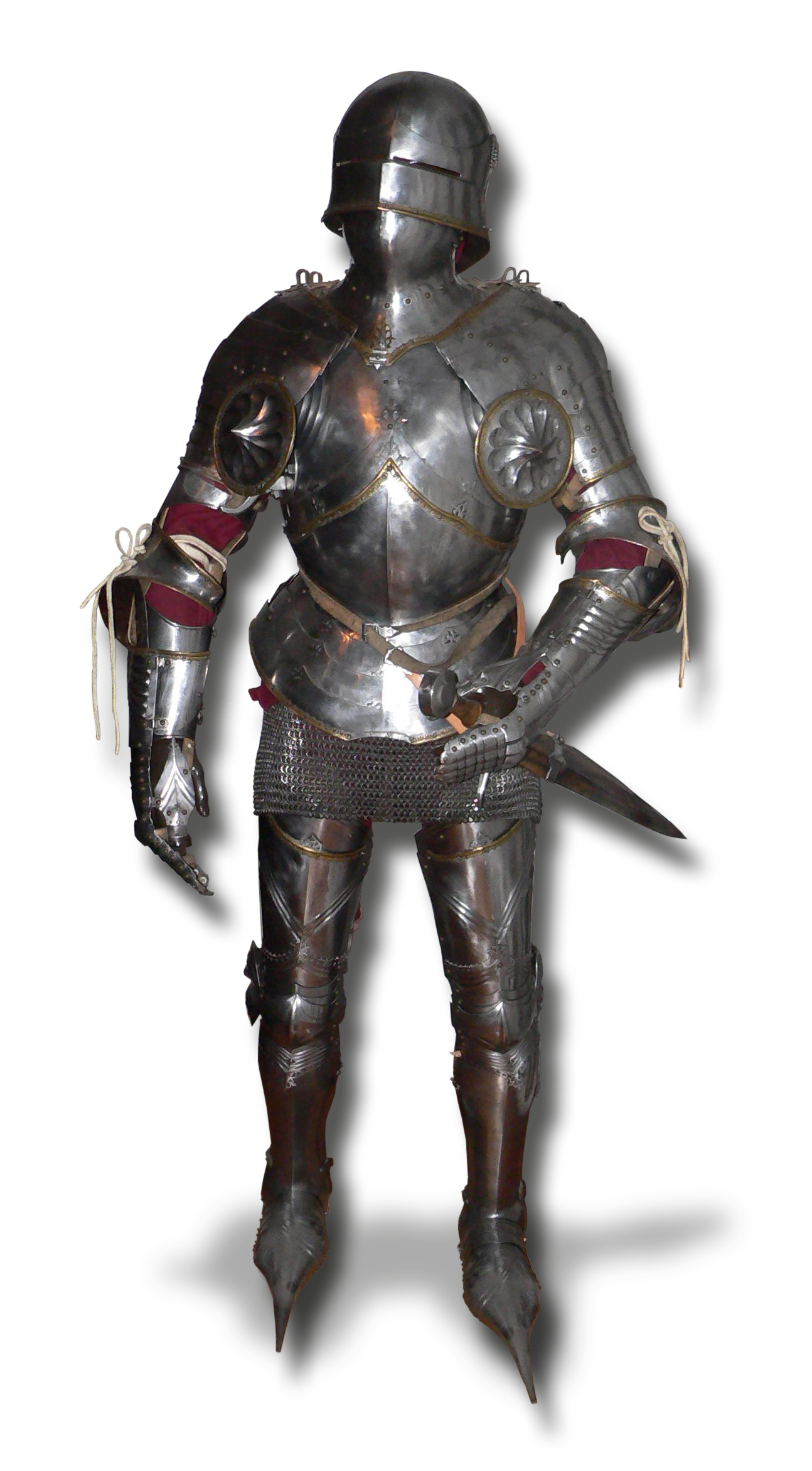

Origin
- Language: Estonian
- Meaning: Knight
- Region of origin: Estonia

Other names
- Variant form: Knight

Rüütel is an Estonian surname (meaning knight). Notable people with the surname include:

- Arnold Rüütel (1928–2024), politician, President of Estonia 2001–2006
- Ingrid Rüütel (born 1935), folklorist and philologist, First Lady of Estonia 2001–2006, wife of President Arnold Rüütel
- Kai Rüütel (born 1981), opera singer
- Margit Rüütel (born 1983), tennis player
- Raido Rüütel (born 1951), racing driver

== See also ==
- Rüütli
