= Zonkaku =

Japanese Buddhist priest of the Jōdo Shinshū sect (1290–1373)

Zonkaku (存覚, 1290–1373) was a prominent Buddhist priest and scholar of early Jōdo Shinshū during the late Kamakura era and Nanboku-chō period. Zonkaku worked to systematize Shin doctrine and expand the tradition throughout Japan. As the first person to write a commentary on Shinran's Kyōgyōshinshō, Zonkaku played a major role in shaping medieval Shin Buddhist thought and practice. He was the eldest son of Kakunyo, the third caretaker of the influential Hongan-ji temple, a tradition which would become central to the institutional formation of Jōdo Shinshū. Although widely recognized for his scholarship, he was embroiled in disputes with his father over temple authority, succession, and regional administration.

Zonkaku devoted his life to the propagation of Pure Land Buddhism. He traveled widely throughout the Kantō region, Mutsu, Ōmi, and Bingo Provinces, all while copying texts, instructing disciples, debating other Japanese Buddhist schools, and establishing networks of followers connected to both Hongan-ji and Bukkō-ji temples. His proselytizing activity contributed substantially to the spread of Shin Buddhist teachings during the tradition's formative period. Zonkaku served as the first head priest of Jōraku-ji in Kyoto's Shimogyō ward and later became the fourth head priest of Nishiōri-ji. His extensive missionary activity and prolific writings made him one of the most influential figures in the medieval development of Shin Buddhism.

== Biography ==
Zonkaku was born on July 11, 1290, as the eldest son of Kakunyo and Hario no Tsubone, daughter of Sōkyōbutsu. His childhood name was Kōshimaro (also read as Kōtōmaru). He was adopted in 1297 by Hino Chikaakira, a former provincial governor, and later again in 1305 by Hino Toshimitsu, at which time he adopted the name Kōgen.

From an early age he undertook a wide-ranging Buddhist education. In 1302, he began his studies under the priest Keikai at the Jōshin-in temple in Nakakawabe, Yamato, which was a betto (a subtemple) of Kōfuku-ji. In 1303 he traveled to Nara, where he was ordained at Tōdai-ji and received the precepts under Keikai, Jitsui, and Ryōkan of Kōfuku-ji. He studied Buddhist doctrine and also received transmissions of esoteric Buddhist practices associated with the Kongōkai (Vajradhātu) mandala. The following year he received the precepts on Mount Hiei at Enryaku-ji and studied Buddhism and received esoteric teachings. He continued his scholastic training through the late 1300s, including a concentrated period of instruction at Anyō-ji under the Nishiyama elder A Nichibō Shōkū, as well as study at Shōmon-in in Bishamon-dani.

In 1310 he returned to Ōtani and began assisting Kakunyo in teaching and administrative duties. He lectured on Shinran's Kyōgyōshinshō at Senju-ji in Echizen in 1311, the fiftieth anniversary of Shinran's death. Kakunyo transferred custodianship of the Ōtani Mausoleum to him in 1314. Zonkaku married in 1316, and in subsequent years he produced copies of several of Shinran's autograph manuscripts. His eldest son, Kōso, was born in 1320.

In 1321 Kakunyo formalized the Ōtani mausoleum as Hongan-ji, establishing the bettō (chief administrator) as its head position. However, serious disagreements over the hereditary succession of the custodianship and over policies for guiding followers in the Kantō region led to Zonkaku's first disownment by Kakunyo in 1322, after which Kakunyo never saw him as his successor again. The division was partly based on Zonkaku's association with the powerful rival Shin temple of Bukkō-ji and its leader Ryōgen, which Kakunyo saw as a threat to Honganji influence. Kakunyo's breaking of ties led Zonkaku to become even more closely associated with Bukkō-ji temple. This caused serious divisions between Shin Buddhist congregations and various Shin groups withheld their support from Honganji due to the dispute. Despite several attempts by Shin congregations to reconcile the two figures, Kakunyo never trusted Zonkaku after this time.

During this period Zonkaku continued writing, producing works such as Jōdo Shinyōshō, Shoshin Hongeshū, Jimyōshō, Haja Kenjōshō, and Nyonin Ōjō Kikigaki for Ryōgen of Bukkō-ji.

Zonkaku also spent extended periods of his life engaged in itinerant propagation. He resided in Kamakura from 1332, later departing for Bukkō-ji in Ōmi in 1333. His son Tsunetoshi (later Jikan, fifth head priest of Nishiōri-ji) was born in 1334. When Ryōgen was killed by bandits in 1335, Zonkaku continued missionary activity independently, including extended activity in Bingo Province, where he composed Kenmyōshō (1337) and participated in a public debate with the Nichiren sect, resulting in treatises such as Ketchishō, Hokke Mondō, Hōonki, Shidōshō, and Senchaku Chūkaishō.

Zonkaku was eventually pardoned by Kakunyo and reinstated to the position of administrator of Hongan-ji in 1338. However, further disagreements led to him being disowned again in 1342. He was then pardoned once more in 1350. Kakunyo died in 1351, and in 1353, Zonkaku relocated to Ōtani Imakoji (Kyoto Jōrakudai), where he remained for the rest of his life. He died on March 22, 1373, aged 84.

Zonkaku stands as one of the most significant doctrinal architects of medieval Jōdo Shinshū. His synthesis of Pure Land faith with local religious realities, interpretation of kami worship, and his extensive missionary work influenced the reception of Shin Buddhist teachings across diverse regions of Japan. Although his relationship with the Hongan-ji lineage was often tumultuous, his writings and interpretations exercised long-lasting influence on both institutional and popular forms of the tradition.

== Religious Thought ==
Zonkaku is known for his developed Shin Buddhist scholarship which cites and relies on the works of other Pure Land schools, especially the Seizan sect and the Chinzei sect. He is also known for some unique interpretations of Shinran's teaching. This led to divergent views of Zonkaku's place within the development of Shin Buddhism, with some scholars seeing him as diverging from Shinran.

In his Rokuyōshō, the first ever commentary on Shinran's Kyōgyōshinshō, Zonkaku writes that the meaning of "Jōdo Shinshū" is the "Pure Land School". According to Dobbins, this means that Zonkaku did not consider Shin Buddhism to be a Pure Land school that was completely separate from the others as Kakunyo did. Instead, Zonkaku saw it as a part of the entire Pure Land movement founded by Hōnen. Zonkaku's teaching often drew from that of other Pure Land schools, such as the Seizan branch of Jōdo-shū. Because of this, Kakunyo saw him as deviating from the true Shin Buddhism.

Zonkaku's doctrinal innovations are visible in his Rokuyōshō, a commentary written in conscious response to other Pure Land schools and to various critiques of Shinran's teaching. Zonkaku's use of Seizan materials, such as ideas associated with the Anjin Ketsujōshō, shows familiarity with their terminology without wholesale acceptance of their doctrine. Furthermore, his extensive but indirect reliance on Chinzei school works, such as Ryōe's Muryōjukyōshō, demonstrates an awareness of their teachings as well. Zonkaku's Rokuyōshō often quotes, rearranges, supplements, or transforms these materials external to Shin Buddhism to articulate his own doctrinal stance and to clarify Shinran's thought in the context of the wider Pure Land scholasticism.

=== Pure Land apologetics ===
Zonkaku's Haja Kenshōshō (Notes Assailing Heresy and Revealing Truth, 1324) provides a defense of Pure Land Buddhism against attacks from other schools (especially Tendai) as well as from civil authorities. In it, Zonkaku defends the Pure Land teaching as one which makes Mahayana Buddhism accessible to all beings, even to the peasants and samurai.

The work contains an extensive account of over seventeen false views about Pure Land Buddhism that Zonkaku refutes in turn. These include false accusations against the Pure Land school, and claims that correct Pure Land practices are heretical or false. He is also conciliatory towards Shinto kami and shrines, seeking to portray Pure Land followers as respectful of all Japanese faiths. He also rejects certain heretical interpretations of Pure Land Buddhism, such as the licensed evil view which says nembutsu practitioners should do evil deeds. Zonkaku also criticized the military monks of Mt. Hiei for their violent attacks against the Pure Land school, intimating that it was these monks who deviated from the true Buddhism.

Zonkaku also engaged in extensive debates with the Nichiren school, whose founder Nichiren had extensively criticized Pure Land Buddhism. This led to other apologetic works such as the dialogues Ketchishō and Hokke Mondō. The key points of these works include how the Pure Land teaching is in harmony with the ultimate intent of the Lotus Sutra, and debates on the value of the nembutsu vis a vis the Lotus Sutra. Citing the Lotus Sutra itself which teaches birth in the Pure Land in the chapter of Medicine King Bodhisattva, Zonkaku argues against the idea that the nembutsu is in conflict with the Lotus Sutra's intent. Furthermore, he also argues that since the Lotus Sutra teaches birth in the Pure Land, it implicitly contains the teaching of the nembutsu. Thus, Zonkaku argues that the nembutsu and the Lotus Sutra are ultimately the same Dharma of the one vehicle, which is Buddha-wisdom itself, writing:

Because both the nembutsu and the Lotus Sutra are the true Dharma of the One Buddha Vehicle, I believe they are one Dharma...Because both are the one true Buddha-wisdom. True reality and the Name are not separate; they are equally the One Buddha Vehicle...Although the text does not explicitly state they are one Dharma, in reality, there is no other Dharma outside the One Buddha Vehicle of the Buddha's wisdom.

According to Tanaka Ryosuke, the theory of the identity of the Lotus Sutra and the nembutsu was not Zonkaku's invention, but was a widely held theory at the time. Furthermore, Zonkaku argues in his Rokuyōshō that for Shinran, all the great sutras like the Lotus and the Avataṃsaka Sūtra "either explicitly or implicitly reveal the benefits bestowed by Amida", and that "the Master deeply understood that all the sutras expounded in the Buddha's lifetime reveal the benefits of Amida's great compassion."

=== Buddhology ===
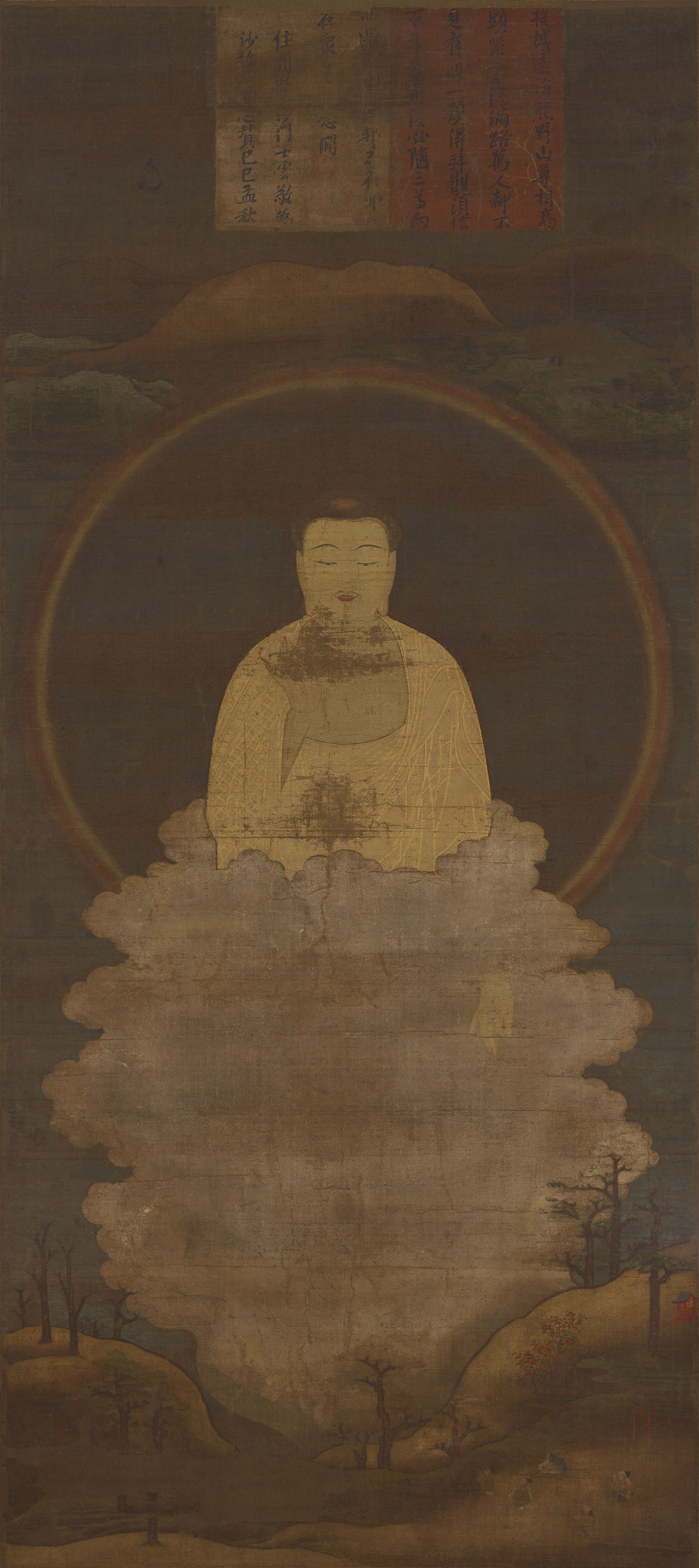
A depiction of the Kumano Gongen, a manifestation of Amida Buddha at the Kumano shrine and an example of the syncretic honji suijaku idea

Although Shinran had emphasized exclusive reliance on Amida Buddha and displayed little interest in encouraging devotion to the Shinto kami and other deities important to Japanese Buddhism, Zonkaku adopted a markedly different stance. Influenced by widespread popular religiosity, and by generally tolerant attitudes prevalent among monks of the Jōdo sect, Zonkaku argued that devotion to deities other than Amida Buddha could be accommodated within the Pure Land path. Zonkaku defended this practice on doctrinal grounds and as a practical necessity for addressing the expectations of rural communities and for facilitating the spread of Jōdo Shinshū.

This view was influenced by Tendai thought, especially its teaching of the essential gate (本門, honmon) and the trace gate (跡門, shakumon), which also manifested itself as the Honji suijaku theory. This theory saw the fundamental original Buddha (本佛, honbutsu) as the essential ground of all other Buddhist deities and kami. For Zonkaku, all other deities, kami, Buddhas and bodhisattvas were skillful manifestations of the original Buddha Amida.

Zonkaku also classified Japanese deities into two categories: Provisional Shrine deities (gonsha-shin) and Actual Shrine deities (jissha-shin). Provisional Shrines were centered on deities which were considered temporary and provisional manifestations of Buddhas or bodhisattvas, manifestations that happened for sake of guiding sentient beings. The deities of such shrines were considered righteous, compassionate protectors. "Actual Shrines", by contrast, were associated with the spirits of living or deceased humans, or with animal spirits such as dragons, or fox spirits, and were regarded as malevolent or potentially harmful.

In Shoshin Hongeshū, Zonkaku states that the divine spirits of Provisional Shrines reveal the benefits of their original ground, the Buddha Amida, and thus ought to be revered. The deities of Actual Shrines, however, were to be rejected or pacified. Likewise, Zonkaku's Rokuyōshō states:

The original ground (honji) of the various deities who protect Japan, the Land of the Kami, is Amida Buddha. Just as reciting Amida's name brings the unseen protection of all Buddhas and Bodhisattvas, the traces (suijaku), the heavenly and earthly deities, undoubtedly share the intent of their original ground, Amida, to save sentient beings. Therefore, provisional shrines should be revered.

Nevertheless, Zonkaku still argues that Amida Buddha ought to be the main object of devotion, since when we worship Amida, we also worship all his manifestations and are protected by them:

However, those who deeply venerate the original ground necessarily take refuge in the trace manifestations. This is because the traces are manifested from the origin. One who solely venerates the trace manifestations cannot be said to have taken refuge in the original ground. This is because the origin is not made manifest from the traces. Therefore if one wishes to take refuge in the trace manifestation kami, one should only take refuge in the buddhas who are their original grounds.

Since the original ground of all deities is Amida, Zonkaku concludes one should primarily take refuge in Amida:

Moreover, the Pratyutpanna-samādhi Sūtra preaches, "The buddhas of the three periods of time (past, present and future) all attain enlighten-ment through the samādhi of meditating on Amida Buddha." Thus it appears that Amida is the original master of the buddhas. If we reflect upon their original master, we can conform to the wishes of the buddhas. Further, the Laṅkāvatāra Sūtra states: "The buddhas and bodhisattvas of the lands of the ten directions have all appeared from the Realm of Utmost Bliss of the Buddha of Eternal Life (Amida Buddha)." This may be understood to mean that the buddhas are all discrete manifestations (funshin 分身) of Amida. If this is so, the principle that people who take refuge in Amida, the original buddha, also take refuge in the discrete manifestation buddhas is clear and needs no explanation.

Hence, Zonkaku's doctrine was never meant to argue for equal worship towards Amida and the kami, and retains the superiority of exclusive Amida devotion inherent in Shinran.

Zonkaku's framework played a significant role in integrating exclusive nenbutsu practice with the religious life of medieval villages. Identifying local tutelary gods and ancestral deities as jissha-shin allowed such beings to be interpreted as potentially dangerous spirits whose curses could be alleviated through nenbutsu recitation. This facilitated the spread of exclusive nenbutsu while simultaneously linking village beliefs, ancestor worship, and Pure Land devotion.

=== View of attainment ===
One of Zonkaku's doctrinal developments that has been discussed by scholars is his unique theory of attaining the fruit of Buddhahood (証果論). This theory attempts to explain and defend Shinran's theory of the attainment of Buddhahood on birth in the Pure Land by drawing on a broader Pure Land context, including on the theories of other Pure Land schools.

Zonkaku's theory is fundamentally structured around two perspectives: the "Gate of Equality" and the "Gate of Distinctions." The Gate of Equality represents the ultimate, non-dual truth that rebirth in the Pure Land is itself the immediate attainment of Buddhahood. In contrast, the Gate of Distinctions provides a provisional, sequential framework that separates the process into stages: first comes rebirth (the "near fruition" or "initial benefit"), which is followed later by the attainment of perfect Buddhahood (the "distant fruition" or "final benefit"). It is within this Gate of Distinctions that Zonkaku's nuanced view of non-retrogression is discussed.

A central and innovative feature of Zonkaku's doctrine is his distinction between the "manifest" and "hidden" aspects of the "Assembly of the Truly Settled", a state synonymous with the attainment of non-retrogression, a state in which the bodhisattva will never regress on the way to enlightenment. The "manifest" aspect refers to "Place-Non-retrogression" (処不退), the prevailing view influenced by masters like Tanluan and the Chinzei branch of Jōdo Shu, which posits that one becomes non-retrogressive only upon being reborn in the Pure Land. Zonkaku acknowledged this interpretation as a valid, though provisional understanding of non-retrogression.

However, Zonkaku argued that the "hidden" aspect represents the true core of Shinran's teaching and the ultimate meaning of non-retrogression in Shin Buddhism. This hidden aspect is "Mind-Non-retrogression" (心不退) or "Faith-Non-retrogression" (信心不退). He grounded this concept in Shandao's teaching that those embraced by Amida's light attain a non-regressing mind. For Zonkaku, this non-retrogression is not a future event in the Pure Land but a present-life reality. The moment the "diamond-like faith" of Other Power arises in a person, their mind becomes irreversibly settled, and they are assured of birth in the Pure Land.

In defense of this view, Zonkaku cites Shandao and the Amida Sutra:

However, even though [we are] ordinary beings of the lowest level, if we hold fast to the Name of Amida and arouse the diamond-like faith, we crosswise escape the retribution of transmigration in the three realms; therefore, we are said to attain 'non-retrogression.' This is not the same as the 'three non-retrogressions' of stage, practice, and thought discussed regarding the bodhisattva stages. What is called 'non-retrogression' here is precisely 'mind-non-retrogression'. Therefore, Master Shandao in the Hōji-san (法事讃) explains, 'Those who receive the light's illumination attain mind-non-retrogression'. The meaning is that by partaking of the benefit of Amida Tathagata's grasping light, one attains 'mind-non-retrogression.' Clearly, the passage in the Amida Sutra states, 'If there are people who desire to be born in the land of Amida Buddha, all these people will attain non-retrogression from unsurpassed, perfect enlightenment.' It says that if people arouse the aspiration wishing to be born in the land of Amida Buddha, they 'all attain non-retrogression.' The text is very clear that when one arouses the faith aspiring for birth in the present life, one immediately conforms to 'non-retrogression....Therefore, when the genuine faith aspiring for birth in Amida Buddha's land arises, Amida Tathagata embraces and grasps it with His pervasive light, and all Buddhas, with one mind, protect and are mindful of this faith. Therefore, unobstructed by all evil karmas and blind passions, this mind itself becomes non-retrogressive and unfailingly attains rebirth. (Zenshō Zenpon, Vol. 3, p. 122-123).

In this way, Zonkaku respectfully incorporates the traditional concept of non-retrogression through rebirth in the Pure Land as the manifest, conventional understanding. Yet, he ultimately prioritizes and defines the essence of Shin non-retrogression as the state of shinjin, where assuredness on the path is fully realized in the present life through the Buddha's power. This creative systematization allowed him to position Shinran's radical teaching within the broader Buddhist discourse while safeguarding its unique emphasis on the decisive accomplishment of faith here and now.

== Scholarly reception ==
During the Edo period (1600–1868), the status of Zonkaku's writings became contested within the Shin Buddhist community. Early Edo evidence shows his sermon texts widely circulated and positively valued. However, by the mid-eighteenth century, amid the compilation of sacred-text catalogues and efforts to demarcate Shin Buddhism from other Pure Land lineages, his authority declined. Works acceptable as general Pure Land teachings came to be viewed as unsuitable for Shin doctrinal use. Statements from figures such as Konrin indicate that Zonkaku had come to be seen as deviating from Shinran's intent. In the Meiji period (1868–1912) this evaluation shifted again, as modern historical scholarship developed within the Honganji academic tradition. Researchers such as Nishitani treated Zonkaku as adjusting his explanations to meet external pressures, thus producing doctrinal innovations that diverged from but also furthered the tradition.

Modern scholarship on Zonkaku divides broadly into two approaches: one views his doctrinal differences from Shinran as a positive, adaptive development (e.g. the work of Kōji Fugen), while the other sees them as a deviant accommodation to medieval social structures. The first approach emphasizes his skillful use of doctrinal teachings from other sects in response to external demands on Shin Buddhism, while the second interprets his deviations as supporting medieval institutional authorities (represented by the work of Shunmaro Shingyō). Other scholars like Taniguchi stress the need to analyze each text in light of its specific circumstances of composition. A common topic of debate has been whether Zonkaku departs from Shinran's teachings or whether his work is an accurate expression of Shinran's intentions.

== Works ==
Zonkaku produced a large corpus of doctrinal writings, commentaries, and instructional texts. His teachings were also preserved in Sonkaku Shōnin Ichigo Ki, a collection of sayings and notes recorded by his son Tsunetoshi (Jikan), which remains an important historical source for the early development of Hongan-ji.

The following is a list of Zonkaku's works in chronological order:

- Essential Record on the True Meaning of the Pure Land (Jōdo Shin Yōshō 浄土真要鈔) 2 fascicles, c. 1324. A basic overview of Shin teaching.
- Collection on Various Kami and the Primal Intent (Shoshin Hongai Shū 諸神本懐集) 2 fascicles, c. 1324. This is the basic text that lays out Zonkaku's interpretation of the kami based on honji suijaku.
- Notes on Holding to the Name (Jimyō Shō 持名鈔) 2 fascicles, c. 1324. An explanation of the nembutsu.
- Notes on Refuting the Wrong and Revealing the Correct (Haja Kenshō Shō 破邪顕正抄) 2 fascicles, c. 1324. Defends the Pure Land teaching against seventeen criticisms.
- Record of Teachings on Women's Birth (Nyonin Ōjō Kikigaki 女人往生聞書) 1 fascicle, c. 1324. Discusses how women can equally attain birth in the Pure Land.
- Notes on Expounding the Name and Form (Benjutsu Myōtai Shō 弁述名体鈔) 1 fascicle, Date Unknown. A description of the three forms of the nembutsu (in 6, 9 and 10 characters).
- Notes on Revealing the Name (Kenmyō Shō 顕名鈔) 2 fascicles, c. 1337. Explains the deeper meaning of Amida's name.
- Notes on Knowledge of Determination (Kecchi Shō 決智鈔) 1 fascicle, c. 1338
- Notes on Walking and Sailing (Busen Shō 歩船鈔) 2 fascicles, c. 1338, an outline text (kōyō-sho) of the essential doctrines of ten Buddhist schools: Hossō, Sanron, Kegon, Tendai, Shingon, Ritsu, Kusha, Jōjitsu, Busshin, and Jōdo. It is similar to Gyōnen's (1240-1321) Hasshū Kōyō.
- Record of Repaying Gratitude (Hō'on Ki 報恩記) 1 fascicle, c.1338. Discusses the repaying of gratitude to teachers and parents, and how the best way to do it is to attain birth in the Pure Land.
- Notes on the Supreme Path Shidō Shō (至道鈔) 1 fascicle, c.1338. A work on filial piety from a Pure Land perspective.
- Annotated Notes on Selections from the Senjakushū (Senjaku Chūgeshō 選択註解鈔) 5 fascicles, c.1338. A commentary on Hōnen's Senjakushū.
- Dharma Words of Zonkaku (Zonkaku Hōgo 存覚法語) 1 fascicle, c. 1356. A vernacular work explaining key passages from the Kyōgyōshinshō.
- Collection of What Was Seen and Heard of the Pure Land (Jōdo Kenmon Shū 浄土見聞集) 1 fascicle, c. 1356
- Writing in Praise of Virtues (Tandoku Mon 嘆徳文) 1 fascicle, c. 1359 (Revised 1366)
- Record of a Slight Understanding (Saige Ki 纔解記) 1 fascicle, c. 1362
- Sleeve Diary of Master Zonkaku (Zonkaku Shōnin Sodenikki 存覚上人袖日記) 1 fascicle – 1334–1371
- Record of Zonkaku's Life (Record of the Life of the Elder, Abbot of Jōraku-ji)
- The Notes on the Six Essentials (Rokuyō Shō 六要鈔) 10 fascicles, c. 1360
