= Rüütli =

Family name

Rüütli is an Estonian surname, meaning "knight". Notable people with the surname include:

- Aksel Herman Rüütli (1893–1976), politician
- Karel Rüütli (born 1978), politician
- Tarmo Rüütli (born 1954), football coach and former player

== See also ==
- Rüütel
