= Kakunyo =

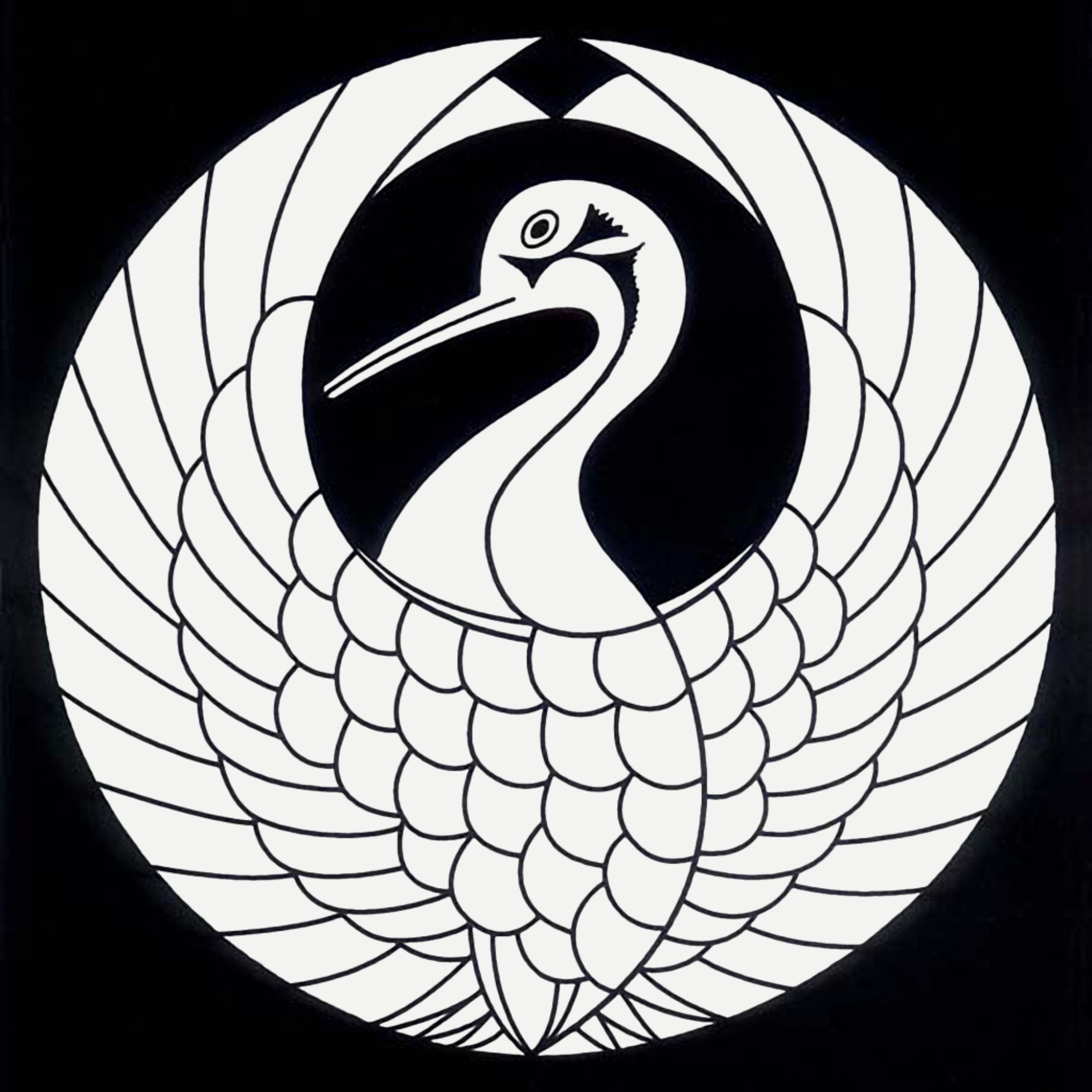
The Crane Circle crest, the family crest of the Honganji families, descendants from Kakunyo.

Kakunyo (覚如, also written as 覺如; 1271–1351) was a key figure of Jōdo Shinshū Buddhism active from the late Kamakura period through the Nanboku-chō period. He was the great-grandson of Shinran and served as the third Monshu (head priest) of the influential Hongan-ji Temple in Kyoto. As head priest of the Ōtani Hongan-ji, he played a decisive role in transforming Shinran's mausoleum into a fully institutionalized Buddhist temple. He is thus regarded by modern scholars as the de facto founder of Hongan-ji as a true religious institution with a doctrinal orthodoxy and regular services.

Kakunyo was also the first to write a biography of Shinran. He was a prolific author whose works asserted the doctrinal authority of Shinran and the Hongan-ji orthodoxy over numerous deviant views and practices. Kakunyo's liturgies comprise an important part of Jōdo Shinshū services, and he is considered to have contributed significantly to the Hōonkō ceremony. Furthermore, his biography of Shinran, the Godenshō (御伝鈔) is still an important source on Shinran's life today.

== Biography ==
Kakunyo was born in Kyoto on February 16, 1271. His childhood name was Kōsen. His father Kakue was the son of Shinran’s youngest daughter, Kakushin-ni, while his mother was the daughter of Nakahara, Governor of Suō Province. Kakunyo's eldest son was the influential Zonkaku, his second son was Jūkaku, and his grandson Zennyo later became the fourth head of the Hongan-ji lineage. Kakunyo died at Hongan-ji in Kyoto (present-day Sōtai-in) on February 23, 1351.

=== Early life and education ===
Kakunyo was initially educated in the Tendai school, studying exoteric and esoteric teachings under Jishinbō Chōkai and Sesshō Hōin Sōchō of Enryaku-ji. He was also ordained a monk and studied Hossō Buddhism at Kōfuku-ji, as well as studying Sanron doctrine with Jishōbō Ryōnen.

Beginning in around 1287, Kakunyo was educated in the Pure Land teachings of Hōnen and Shinran by Nyoshin, Shinran’s grandson, who visited Kyoto for Shinran’s monthly memorial services. He also received teachings from Yuien of Kawawada. Kakunyo's study under these two men impacted him deeply, leading him to become seriously committed to the Pure Land teachings of Shinran. His son Zonkaku was born on 1290, and that same year, Kakunyo traveled with his father Kakue and Jinga Hōgen to various Shinran-related sites in the Kantō region. He also pursued extensive Pure Land doctrinal study under Anichibō Shōkū of the Seizan's school Higashiyama branch at An’yō-ji. This figure is possibly the author of the Anjin Ketsujō Shō, which Kakunyo cites. Kakunyo also studied Kōsai's teachings under Shōen of the Ichinen-gi branch’s Jikō-ji.

=== Rise to Leadership ===
In 1294, Kakunyo composed the Hōonkō shiki, which developed the liturgical form of the Hōonkō, a memorial rite for Shinran. This remains a key yearly ceremony for Shin Buddhism to this day. In 1301 he wrote the Shūi Kotoku Den, a work which argues that Shinran was Hōnen’s legitimate successor.

A major turning point in his career was the conflict with Yuizen over succession to the Rusushiki (custodianship) of the Ōtani mausoleum. The conflict began in 1302 and escalated when, in 1306, Yuizen seized the keys to the mausoleum and occupied it. Kakunyo and Kakue sought refuge in Kyoto. In 1309, the Shōren-in monzeki ruled that the custodianship should pass to Kakunyo. Yuizen responded by escaping to Kamakura with a sacred image of Shinran and some of his ashes, while destroying the mausoleum. Although the dispute was resolved in Kakunyo’s favor, many Shin followers in the Kantō region objected to restricting the custodianship succession to blood descendants of Shinran and so they did not unconditionally accept Kakunyo. Kakunyo therefore drafted a twelve-article petition as a condition for assuming the position. Kakunyo then traveled to the Kantō region in 1310, securing recognition as the custodian after sustained negotiations with the Kantō Shin congregations (monto). In 1311, for Shinran’s 50th memorial, he rebuilt both the sacred image and the Eidō (Hall of the Portrait).

=== Formation of Hongan-ji ===
From the early 1310s onwards, Kakunyo worked toward institutional consolidation of Shin Buddhism around the Honganji temple, constructed around the restored mausoleum of Shinran at Ōtani (the Ōtani Byōdō). In 1312 he briefly adopted the temple name “Senshū-ji” for the mausoleum, withdrawing it after opposition from Mount Hiei. In 1314 he transferred the custodianship to Zonkaku and retired. Kakunyo formally established Hongan-ji temple in 1321, transforming the mausoleum into a temple and converting the custodianship office into the Bettō Shiki, which incorporated the role of head priest. He also attempted to replace the traditional Jūji Myōgō (a scroll with the ten-character nembutsu) as the primary object of veneration (honzon) with a new standing image of Amida, but opposition from Takada sect followers prevented this change.

Doctrinal and administrative disputes with Zonkaku culminated in Kakunyo’s disowning him in 1322 and resuming the role of head priest. The disagreements included disputes over the hereditary succession of the custodianship and over policies for guiding followers in the Kantō region. The dispute was also partly based on Zonkaku's association with the rival Shin temple of Bukkō-ji and its leader Ryōgen, which Kakunyo saw as a threat to Honganji influence. This dispute caused serious divisions between Shin Buddhist congregations and various Shin groups withheld their support from Honganji at this time. Despite several attempts by Shin congregations to reconcile the two figures, Kakunyo never trusted Zonkaku again.

In 1331 Kakunyo composed the Kudenshō, which articulates the idea of the “Bloodline of Three Generations of Transmission” (sandaidenji no kechimyaku) establishing him as the third head of Hongan-ji after Shinran and Nyoshin. The transmission of the teaching is traced through Hōnen, Shinran, Nyoshin and Kakunyo, and the bloodline of Shinran is traced through Kakushin-ni, Kakue, Kakunyo. This was an attempt to show that he was the legitimate successor of the Dharma transmitted through the teacher-disciple lineage going back to Hōnen and Shinran and to establish the center of the Pure Land community at Honganji.

During the turmoil of the Kenmu era (1334–1338), the new Hongan-ji was destroyed by fire in 1336, and the first draft of the Shinran Den’e was lost. Kakunyo sought refuge at Zonkaku’s residence in Ōmi. In 1337 he returned to Kyoto, residing at Kuon-ji on Nishiyama and composing the Honganshō and Gajashō. In 1338 Zonkaku was pardoned and restored into office. However, in 1342 Kakunyo again disowned him, resuming authority.

In 1350 Kakunyo pardoned Zonkaku once more, though he arranged for the succession of the head priest office to pass on to Zennyo, the son of his second son Jūkaku.

Kakunyo died on February 23, 1351. His funeral was held at Ennin-ji. His mausoleum is preserved within the Ōtani Hombyō (Hongan-ji Nishiyama Betsuin) for the Hongan-ji-ha lineage and the Ōtani Sobyō for the Ōtani-ha lineage.

== Role in Honganji doctrine and practice ==
Whatever the diversity of Kakunyo's education, he came to develop a strong faith in Shinran's teaching that true faith (shinjin) was the only cause of birth in the Pure Land, while nembutsu was a natural grateful response arising from shinjin. Kakunyo soon became a staunch defender of this view, which differed from the standard Jōdo-shū position that saw the nembutsu itself as the main cause of birth. This also led Kakunyo to see Jōdo Shinshū as being a distinct school of Pure Land Buddhism, one which was different in several respects from the growing Jōdo-shū sect, especially the influential Chinzei branch.

Kakunyo emphasized the importance of the teachings of Shinran, seeking to defend, maintain and promote these teachings as the orthodoxy of Jōdo Shinshū and to stamp out any divergent or heretical teachings that had become widespread at the time. As such he wrote works which attempt to establish and defend the doctrines of Shinran in particular, such as Kudenshō 口伝鈔 (Extracts from the oral transmission) and the Gaijashō 改邪鈔 (Extracts correcting heresy).

The issue of the main cause of rebirth being shinjin also became a major point of dispute between Kakunyo and his son Zonkaku, who seemed to be closer or at least more conciliatory to Jōdo-shū doctrines. According to Dobbins, Zonkaku did not consider Shin Buddhism to be a Pure Land school that was completely separate from Jōdo-shū. Zonkaku's teachings also drew from that of other Pure Land schools, such as Seizan. Because of this, Kakunyo saw him as deviating from the true Shin Buddhism of Shinran.

Kakunyo's main efforts revolved around the institutionalization of the Honganji temple tradition and the promotion of the teachings of Shinran. Callahan writes that in order to accomplish this,

Kakunyo instituted regular memorial services at the memorial chapel and produced ritual, doctrinal, and illustrated biographies in order to foster a cult of founder worship, transmit and define Shinran’s teachings, and envision a distinct community in Shinran’s name. In this context of competing foci of devotion and authority, rival lineages and sacred sites, Kakunyo’s hagiographic vision provided not only a record of Shinran’s life, but also constructed Shinran as a new source of authority, produced the narrative and ritual structures of remembrance, and located the memory of Shinran and the community in a specific place, the memorial site and later temple, Honganji. Through the Hōon kōshiki, Kakunyo restructured the memorial services around the virtues of Shinran’s life, teaching, and community, and reformulated the memorial services as a means through which to establish a karmic connection with Shinran. Similar to the Chion kōshiki written by Ryūkan for Hōnen, Kakunyo’s Hōon kōshiki recognizes Shinran as the “original teacher” of the true import for the Pure Land teachings and a manifestation of Amida Buddha.

According to Callahan, Kakunyo's efforts also extended towards the promotion of the worship of Shinran himself, now considered to be a manifestation body of Amida and this can be seen in his Hōon kōshiki and the Shinran den’e, which he sought to legitimize as sacred texts for the new community.

Callahan also argues that through the Hōon kōshiki (The Rite for the Repaying of Gratitude), a "ritual biography" of Shinran, Kakunyo introduced a ritual practice that sought to establish karmic relationships or kechien between the devotees and Amida Buddha, manifest as Shinran. The central aspect of this (most clearly expressed in the yearly Hōonkō ceremony) was developing the quality of "responding to benevolence" (hōon) which is often translated as "gratitude". According to Callahan, Kakunyo "redefined Shin Buddhist piety and the practice of the nembutsu" as hōon, which was now seen as "the essential religious practice fundamental for birth in the Pure Land". Thus, while the focus on gratitude is often said to have been a feature of Rennyo's teaching, for Callahan, "it can be said that Kakunyo reconceived all ritual and religious practice in terms of gratitude".

Kakunyo's writings also stress the importance of himself as the heir and main transmitter of Shinran's legacy. In his Kudenshō (Notes of Oral Transmissions), he establishes a master-disciple transmission lineage going back to Shinran through Kakunyo's teacher Nyoshin. As Dobbins writes, "Kakunyo's description of his face-to-face association with Nyoshin echoes the master-disciple relationships of the traditional schools of Buddhism, on which doctrinal transmission and religious authority were based. Although Shinran himself disavowed the position of religious master, the lineage that Kakunyo claimed through Nyoshin in effect cast Shinran in that very role. Through this lineage Kakunyo invested himself with doctrinal authority and effectively united it with his hereditary right of Honganji caretakership, thereby making the office not only administrative but ecclesiastical."

Kakunyo was also concerned with defining what was the orthodox Shin Buddhist doctrine against wrong beliefs. To this end, he wrote the Gaijashō (Notes Rectifying Heresy) to establish the "proper" Shin doctrine. This polemical work contains a list of around twenty topics and critiques the wrong or heretical practices and views one by one. Examples of these heresies include the usage of salvation registers (myōchō), a register of names of people who had said the nembutsu and were considered to be sure to attain birth in the Pure Land and the use of portrait lineages (ekeizu). He also rejected the worship of religious teachers as being embodiments of Amida.

== Works ==
Kakunyo’s corpus is extensive and foundational for the doctrinal and institutional identity of Hongan-ji. His major works include:

- Hōon kōshiki
- Hongan-ji Shōnin Den’e (also Goden-shō, Shinran Den’e)
- Shūi Kotoku Den
- Shūjishō
- Kudenshō
- Honganshō
- Gaijashō
- Ganganshō
- Saiyōshō
- Shusse Gan’i
- Kyōgyōshinshō Tai’i (a summary of the essentials of the Kyōgyōshinshō)

Related texts by disciples and associates include the Boki Ekotoba (10 vols.) by Jūkaku and the Saishukyōjū Ekotoba (7 vols.) by Jōsen.
