= Bukkō-ji =

Buddhist temple in Kyoto, Japan

Bukkō-ji 佛光寺
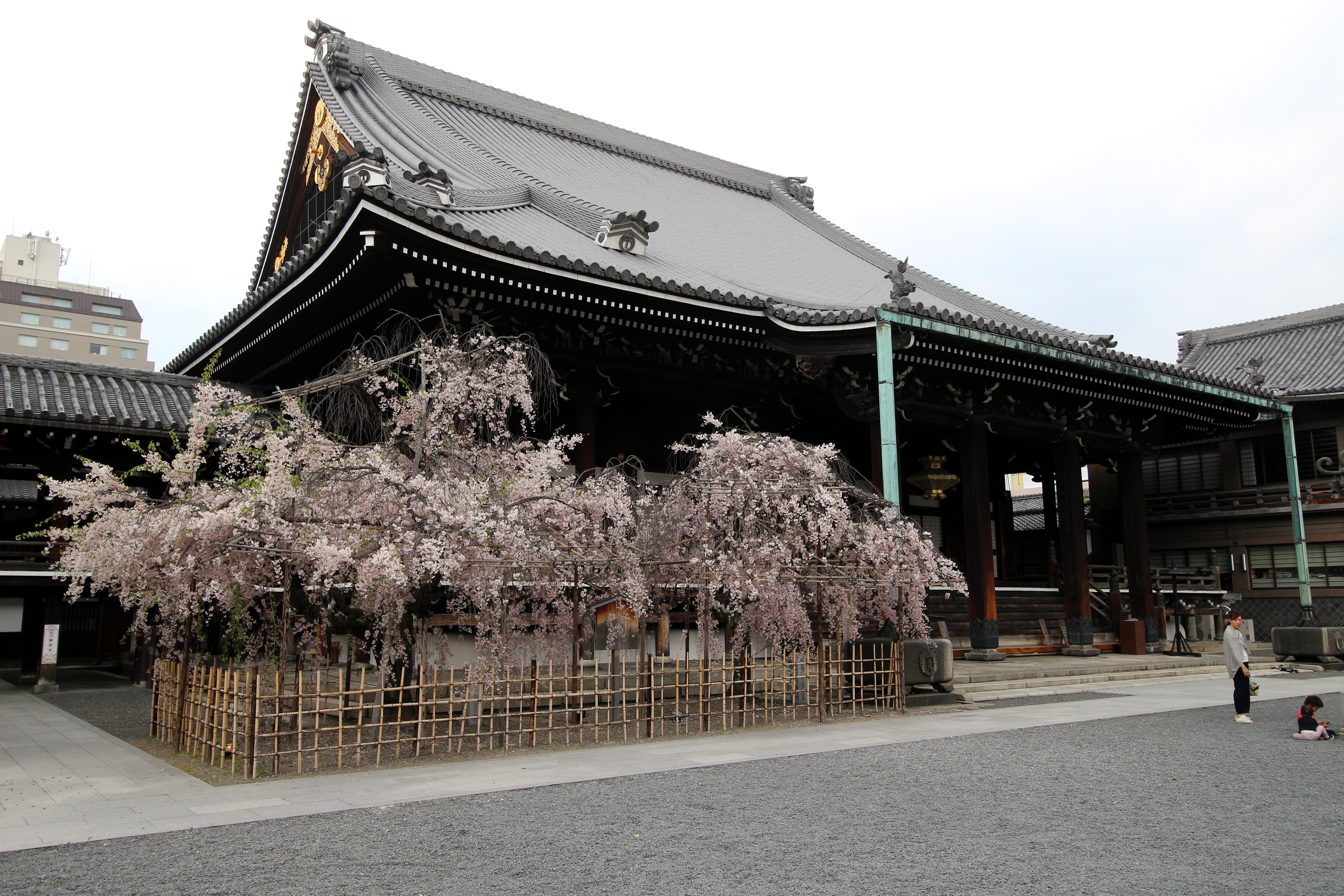
- Amitābha Hall

- Location within Japan

Religion
- Affiliation: Jōdo Shinshū Bukkōji-ha
- Status: Head temple

Location
- Location: 397 Shinkai-chō, below Bukkō-ji and Takakura-dōri, Shimogyō-ku, Kyoto, Kyoto Prefecture
- Country: Japan
- Coordinates: 35°00′03″N 135°45′44″E

Architecture
- Founder: Shinran (acc. legend)
- Completed: 1212 (acc. legend)

Website
- http://www.bukkoji.or.jp/english/index.html

Bukkō-ji (佛光寺, Bukkō-ji), also known as the "Temple of the Buddha's Light", was originally named Kōshō-ji, a Jōdo Shinshū temple in the Yamashina ward of Kyoto, which later moved to the heart of Kyoto. The temple was founded and officially opened by a disciple named Ryōgen in 1324, but by the 15th century, Bukkō-ji was the largest and most successful temple, and its network of branch temples extending throughout the provinces of western Japan. As a rival to the Hongan-ji, it received much criticism for its evangelical practices from Kakunyo the head of the Hongan-ji. Around 1481, however, Bukkō-ji became a subordinate temple to the Hongan-ji. Many of the Bukkō-ji's congregation thus became members of the Hongan-ji, thus greatly reducing the stature.

While Bukkō-ji is technically an independent Jōdo Shinshū branch it has had close links to the Hongan-ji lineage since the time of Rennyo.

== History ==
The founder of the Bukkō-ji temple, Ryōgen (了源 1295–1336), was a disciple of Jōdo Shinshū Buddhism in the Kantō region, but moved to Kyoto in 1320 in order to set up a small chapel in the Yamashina area of Yamashiro Province (now part of modern-day Kyoto). The head of the Hongan-ji at the time, Kakunyo, initially was receptive of the idea and gave it the name Kōshō-ji (興正寺). Further, Kakunyo instructed his son Zonkaku to administer to Ryōgen religious training and Hongan-ji textual documents. Zonkaku and Ryōgen developed a strong rapport with one another during this period, but by 1324 the tension between Zonkaku and his father, Kakunyo, had worsened to the point that Kakunyo disinherited his son and disassociated himself with Ryōgen due to differences in understanding Hōnen and Shinran's teachings. Thus, when Kosho-ji was established in 1324, it was not done so under the blessing of Hongan-ji. Zonkaku was a priest along with Ryōgen in the formative years of the temple, and assisted with presiding over certain yearly festivals and writing manuals and texts to use.

In 1329 the following at Kōshō-ji outgrew the building's capacity, and the building was relocated to Kyoto very close to Hongan-ji. Zonkaku renamed the temple Bukkō-ji, so as to disassociate it further from Kukanyo.

In the coming decade Bukkō-ji became more successful than Hongan-ji, and Ryōgen was traveling into new provinces teaching Hōnen and Shinran's message and using a style of proselytizing similar to the Ji-shū school, including:

- Use of nembutsu inscriptions for followers.
- "Salvation registers" (myōchō 名帳), a register of followers who declare their faith in Amitabha Buddha, and thus establish a karmic link with that Buddha.
- Portrait lineages (ekeizu 絵系図), which provided a visual representation of one's lineage, starting with their immediate teacher, and extending back to past Pure Land Buddhist masters.

The Bukkō-ji lineage thus had a more hierarchical and evangelical structure than the competing Hongan-ji lineage. Use of registers, lineages and such placed greater importance on the local priest, who in turn relied on the parent temple, whereas in the Hongan-ji lineage priests and followers were technically equal. Like all Shinshu sects, priests were allowed to marry and raise families, and regularly drew followers from lower-class peasant and artisan communities.

In 1336, while touring the provinces, Ryōgen was murdered by a group of bandits. Genran (1318–1347), Ryōgen's son, took over the temple but died shortly after. In spite of this setback, the temple continued to flourish, and was singled out by Kakunyo in his Gaijashō (改邪鈔; "Notes Rectifying Heresy") for criticism of its practices.

From the time of the temple's founding until Rennyo unified many of these disparate branches, Bukkō-ji spread its teachings to the provinces of Tōtōmi, Iga, Ise, Owari and Mikawa. But when Rennyo took control of Hongan-ji, the Bukkō-ji lost many members to him. Kyōgō (died 1490), who was next in-line to become the head of Bukkō-ji left to train under Rennyo at Hongan-ji. Kyōgō's motives are unclear.

Kyōgō went on to found his own temple, in affiliation with Hongan-ji, he called Kōshō-ji, the original name intended for Bukkō-ji. This move attracted yet more Bukkō-ji adherents away. Historically, Bukkō-ji has continued to be an influential temple in the Hongan-ji network and always follows the Hongan-ji if the latter relocates.
