= Hōonkō =

Holiday in the Jodo Shinshu tradition of Buddhism

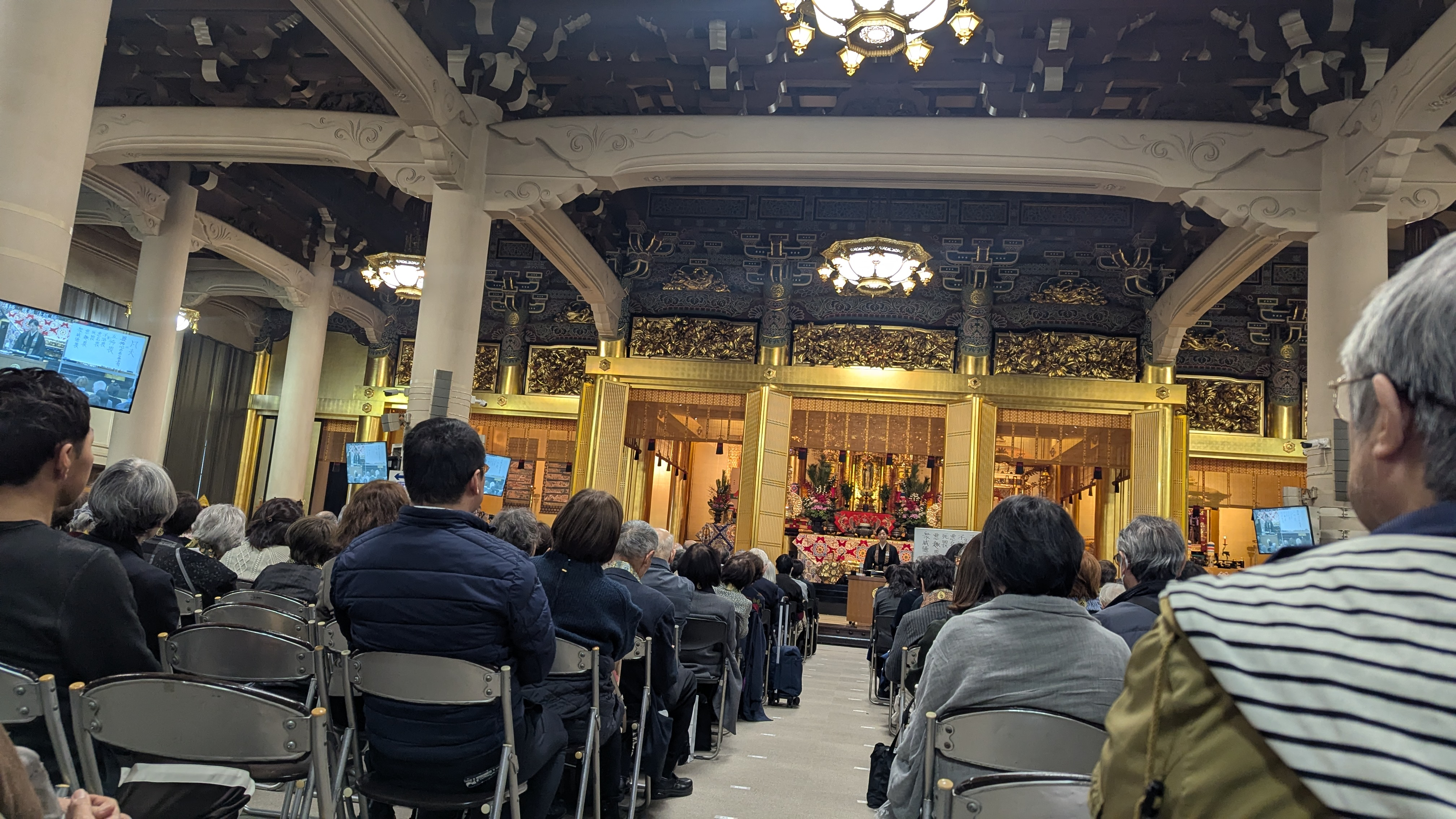
Hōonkō at Tsukiji Honganji Temple

Hōonkō (報恩講) is a holiday in the Jodo Shinshu tradition of Buddhism which commemorates the death of its founder, Shinran Shonin. Depending on whether the old Japanese lunar calendar is used, or the western Gregorian calendar, typically this holiday is observed either in around 28 November (as in the Higashi Honganji) or early January from the 9th to the 16th (as in the Nishi Honganji) respectively. This holiday is among the most important observed in the Jodo Shinshu tradition. The observance began after Shinran's youngest daughter, Kakushinni (覚信尼; 1224-1283), assumed administration of Shinran's mausoleum, a duty later inherited by her descendants, who ultimately became the Monshu of Jodo Shinshu. In the word hōonkō; 'hōon' means "return of gratitude" and 'ko' means "to clarify the meaning of" or "gathering"'.

A typical service for Hoonko will consist of reciting Shinran's hymn, the Shoshinge, and a reading from the life of Shinran. Followers will sometimes observe a strict diet that day, preferring to eat shōjin ryōri or "Buddhist cuisine", though this is entirely optional. Temple services will often serve Buddhist cuisine after service, including vegetarian ozōni, adzuki, and mochi.

== History ==
In the first decade after the death of Shinran, his grave in the eastern hills of Kyoto known as Otani (now Higashiyama-ku) was marked by a simple stone monument with the six kanji of the nenbutsu. At the initiative of Kakushinni, the ashes were moved in 1272. The new location in Otani was further west, near the original grave of Hōnen, and a small hexagonal chapel was built on land donated by Kakushinni that had belonged to her deceased husband. Yearly ceremonies were celebrated by Shin followers from the beginning of this mausoleum. Shinran's great grandson Kakunyo was instrumental in establishing the Hōonkō rituals.
