= Raido Villers =

Estonian basketball player

BC Rakvere Tarvas
- Position: Small forward
- League: KML; BBL Challenge Cup

Personal information
- Born: November 28, 1982 (age 43) Jõhvi, Estonia
- Listed height: 6 ft 6 in (1.98 m)
- Listed weight: 209 lb (95 kg)

Career information
- Playing career: 2000–2011

Career history
- 2000–2011: BC Rakvere Tarvas

Raido Villers (born November 28, 1982, in Jõhvi, Estonia) is a former Estonian professional basketballer. He spent his whole career with the BC Rakvere Tarvas. He retired from the professional basketball after achieving first medals in the Korvpalli Meistriliiga and Estonian Basketball Cup in 2010 and 2011 respectively.

== Honours ==
- Estonian Basketball League:
  - Runner-up: 2009–10
- Estonian Basketball Cup:
  - Runner-up: 2010-11
