= Raido Rüütel =

Estonian racing driver (born 1951)

Raido Rüütel (born 19 September 1951) is an Estonian racing driver.

He was born in Tallinn. He studied at Tallinn Pedagogical Institute's Faculty of Physical Education.

He began his motorsport career in 1970, coached by Enn Griffel and Richard Laur. In 1981 he won with Toomas Ristlaan silver medal at Soviet Union championships. He is multiple-times Estonian champion in different motorsport disciplines.

He has been a member of Estonian Autosport Union.
