= Mibu-dera =

Buddhist temple in Kyoto, Japan

Mibu-dera 壬生寺
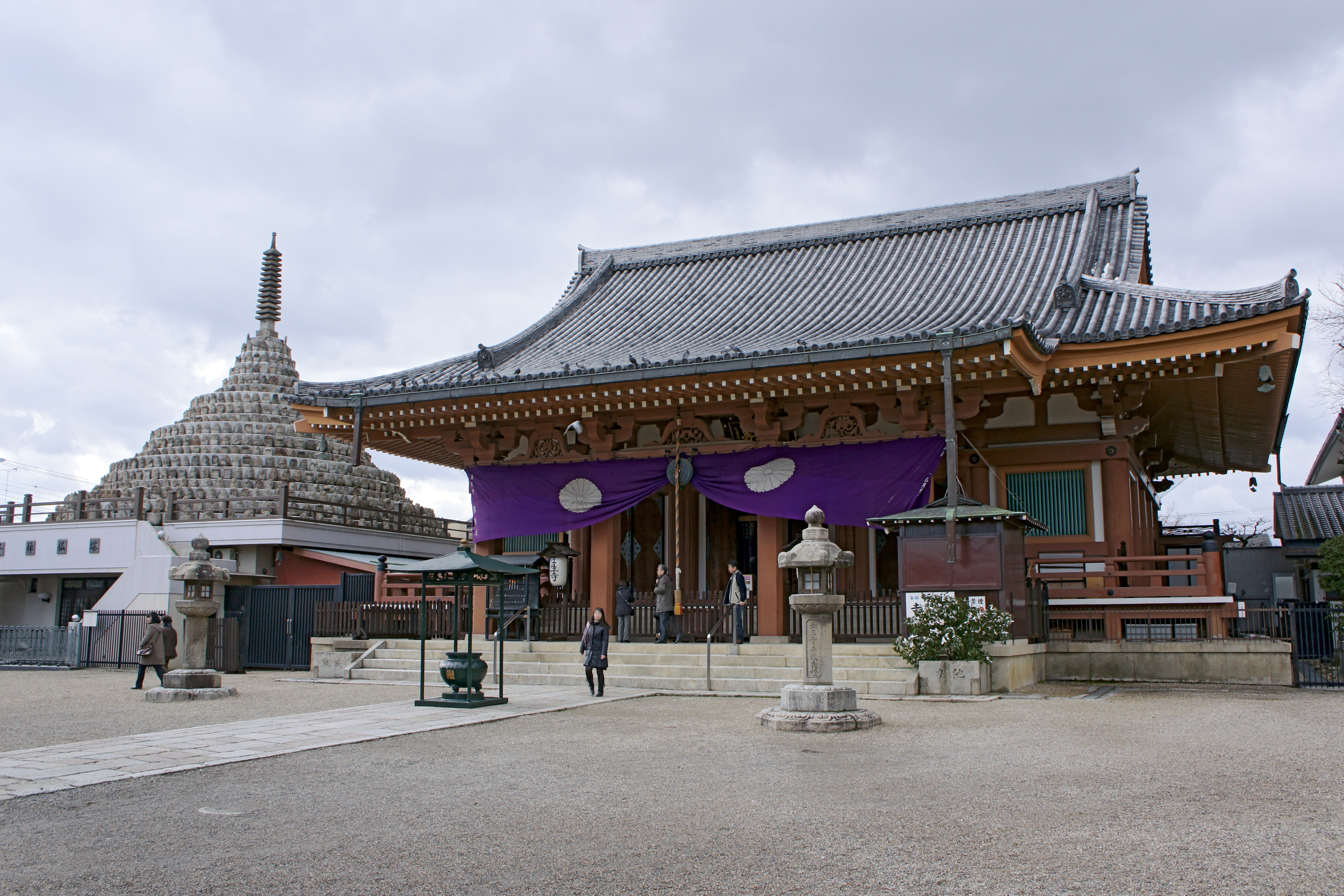
- Main hall

Religion
- Affiliation: Risshū

Location
- Location: 31 Mibunaginomiya-cho, Nakagyō-ku, Kyoto
- Country: Japan
- Interactive map of Mibu-dera 壬生寺
- Coordinates: 35°0′5.76″N 135°44′36.02″E

Architecture
- Founder: Kaiken (快賢)
- Completed: 991

Mibu-dera (壬生寺) is a Buddhist temple in Nakagyō-ku, Kyoto. In the Middle Ages, the temple revived a performance created by the Yuzu Nembutsu monk Engaku known as the Dai Nembutsu Kyōgen. It is also known for having been affiliated with the Shinsengumi. The temple has taken on several other names such "Jizō-in (地蔵院)", "Hōdōsanmai-in (宝幢三昧寺)", and "Shinjōkō-in (心浄光院)."

The current abbot is Shunkai Matsuura.

== History ==
The temple was founded in 991 by the monk Kaiken of Onjō-ji as a gift to his mother. In 1005 a memorial service was held in which the temple was given the name "Komii-dera (小三井寺, lit. "little Mii-dera")" in reference to the founder's original temple. It is said that the title "Jizō-in" was bestowed on the temple during Emperor Shirakawa's imperial visit.

The priest Engaku of the Yuzu Nembutsu school restored the temple in the medieval period. Tradition holds that he was responsible for establishing the practice of the Mibu Dai Nembutsu Kyōgen, now an Important Intangible Folk Cultural Property.

Towards the end of the Edo period, the Tokugawa Bakufu established the Mibu Rōshigumi at the nearby stronghold, the Yagi House (八木家 Yagike). The Mibu Rōshigumi were an elite public security corp that would later be known as the Shinsengumi. Mibu-dera's grounds served as the base for the organization's military and martial arts training. A bronze statue of commander Kondō Isami stands within the temple precincts, as well as a grave-site for Shinsengumi regimental soldiers. The resting place of Kondō Isami is believed to be elsewhere. Aizuwakamatsu and Mitaka, Tokyo have been suggested as possible locations.

Mibu-dera's main image was originally a half-lotus seated Kṣitigarbha statue, fashioned in the latter part of the Kamakura period, affectionately dubbed "Mibu Jizō" among the local faithful. The image was destroyed by arson along with the main hall on July 25, 1962. After the fire, a standing Kṣitigarbha statue was relocated from the head temple Tōshōdai-ji and became the temple's new main image. The main hall was rebuilt in 1967.

== Temple grounds ==
- "Ah Shinsengumi" (あゝ新撰組) Literary Monument, established by volunteers in the 11th year of the Heisei period. Includes a button that plays the song three times when pressed
- Amida-dō (阿弥陀堂), west of the Ichiya Tenjin-dō. Includes admission fee
- Benten-dō (弁天堂), west of the Amida-dō
- Dai Nembutsu-dō (大念仏堂), the kyōgen stage and an Important Cultural Property
- Ichiya Tenjin-dō (一夜天神堂), on the northern side of the inner east gate
- Bronze statue of Kondō Isami
- Mibu burial mound (壬生塚 Mibu-tsuka)
- Rokkaku-dō (六角堂), west of the Benten-dō
- Sentai Buttō (千体仏塔), a stupa that enshrines one-thousand stone Buddhas. South of the main hall
- Sekizō Hōkyōintō (石像宝篋印塔), to the left of the Ichiya Tenjin-dō
