= Lotteries in Japan =

Example of a lottery selling booth in Kamigyō-ku, Kyoto

Lotteries in Japan, sometimes referred to as takarakuji (Japanese: 宝くじ), are run by local governments designated by the Ministry of Internal Affairs and Communications. Lotteries, such as Jumbo Lotteries, are held in five blocs. Sports lotteries under the Sports Promotion Lotteries (スポーツ振興くじ), such as Soccer-kuji and TotoGOAL, were established in the 2000s.

The practice of lotteries in Japan dates back to the Muromachi period but became popular during the Edo period. It was later banned by the Tokugawa shogunate in 1842, and again by the Meiji government in 1869. The practice was revived in 1945 with the first government lottery held in the same year.

By fiscal year 2011, Japanese people are reported to have spent a total of ¥1 trillion (2011) (equivalent to ¥1.15 trillion or US$7.58 billion in 2024) on lotteries.

== History ==
=== Edo period ===
The first lotteries in Japan can be traced back to the Muromachi period. It became popular during the Edo period. Lottery events were held in major cities such as Edo, Kyoto, and Osaka to fund repairs for various temples in the cities, such as the Benzaiten shrine in Minoh in Settsu Province and Taiyū-ji in Osaka, Ninna-ji in Omuro in Kyoto.

During this period, lotteries were held on a specific date and at a specific location, where participants placed a wooden token (fuda) corresponding to the lottery ticket number called tomifuda (富札) that was sold into a box. The price of the tickets was around 1.5 and 2.5 momme of silver (around ¥1,500 (US$9.47) to ¥2,500 (US$15.79)). The winning ticket was selected by a blindfolded monk piercing it with a gimlet. It is termed Tomitsuki (富突), which comes from tomi, which means luck, and tsuki, which derives from the verb tsuku (突く) meaning to spear. The organizers take a portion of the prize as a service fee or (hōnōkin), which is typically around 10 to 30%.

In Edo, the Edo no Santomi (江戸の三富; Three Lotteries of Edo), held at Kanno-ji in Yanaka, Ryūsen-ji in Meguro, and Tenjin shrine in Yushima. It was officially recognized by the Tokugawa Shogunate during the Kan'ei period.

In December 1831, a lottery was held to repair the Great Buddha Hall in Myōhōin-no-miya in Kyoto. The highest prize was 100 ryō of gold (around ¥6 million (US$37,898.89)) and the lowest prize was 5 fun of gold (around ¥15,000 (US$94.75)). Lotteries in the Edo period peaked in popularity during the Bunka period and early Tenpō period, with the introduction of underground lotteries such as kagetomi (影富), which cost several mon. Chief senior councillor Mizuno Tadakuni tightened regulations on lottery events in 1834, and as part of the Tenpō Reforms, the government completely prohibited lottery events in 1842, although the practice continued until 1869.

=== Modern period ===
Lotteries were banned by the Meiji government in 1868. It was revived as kachifuda (勝札) in July 1945 under the Temporary Fund Adjustment Act to raise funds for military expenses during World War II, but the war ended before the first draw was held. In October, the "First Government Lottery" (政府第1回宝籤, Seifu Dai-ikkai Takarakuji) was launched to absorb excess purchasing power and secure funds for national reconstruction after the war. A ticket cost ¥10 (1945) (equivalent to ¥2,713.15 or US$17.92 in 2024), and the grand prize was ¥100,000 (1945) (equivalent to ¥27.13 million or US$179,244.05 in 2024). Alongside the grand prize, the two calico fabrics were also offered as bonus prizes and provided 10 cigarettes to anyone who held four losing tickets. In 1946, the Temporary Fund Adjustment Act was revised to allow local government to issue lotteries. Lotteries such as speed-kuji (スピードくじ), where it is allowed prizes like cigarettes to be claimed on the spot, contributed to the popularity of lotteries during the reconstruction period in post-war Japan.

In 1948, the Temporary Fund Adjustment Act was repealed and was replaced with the Prize Money Certificate Act, which established a framework for lotteries. Alongside national and prefectural lotteries, five major cities and war-torn cities in Japan established their own lotteries in 1949. In 1954, the government lotteries were abolished. They were replaced by joint lotteries of local governments by bloc. In 1968, the grand prize for the lotteries reached ¥10 million (1968) (equivalent to ¥39.7 million or US$262,303.36 in 2024), with a rise in popularity in the 1970s. By 1996, the grand prize for Jumbo Takarakuji (ジャンボ宝くじ) surpassed ¥100 million (1996) (equivalent to ¥113.04 million or US$746,820.69 in 2024)

== Legality and system ==
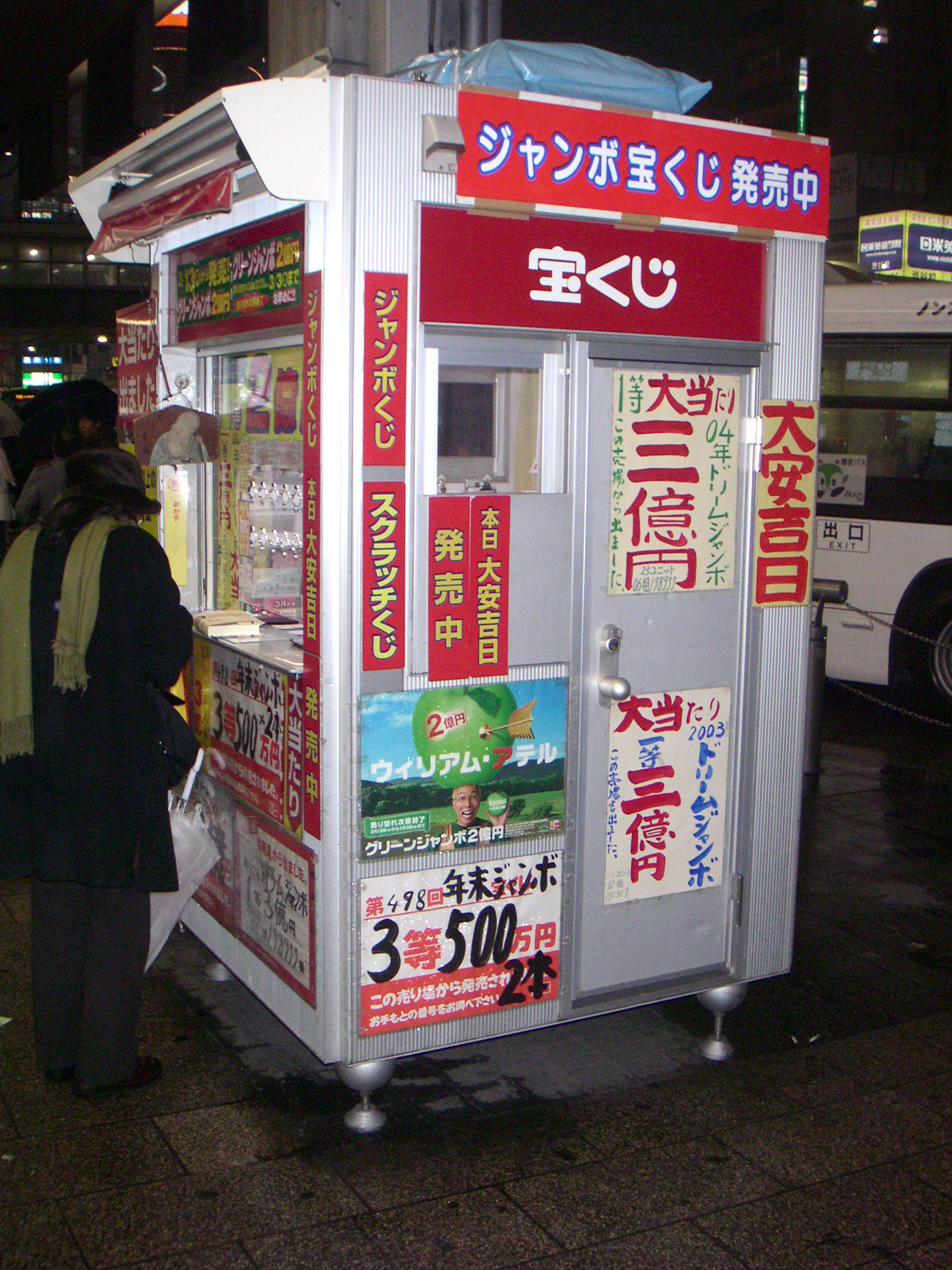
Lottery selling booth in Shibuya, Tokyo

Lotteries in Japan are only allowed to be run by local governments such as prefectural and designated cities governments, with permission from the Ministry of Internal Affairs and Communications. It is illegal for individuals and organizations to run lotteries. Lotteries are available online or offline. There are no age restrictions for lotteries, excluding sports promotion lotteries, where the minimum age requirement is 19 years old.

Prizes from the lotteries are required by law to not exceed 100,000 times the ticket prize, and are exempt from income tax.

The operation and administration of lottery sales and the payment of prize money are handled by Mizuho Bank. The lottery ticket costs are broken down as 46.2% for prize money, 39.8% for local government revenue, 7.3% for commissions, 3.8% for expenses such as printing and advertising, and 2.9% for grant activities conducted through the Japan Lottery Association. The funds are used for the construction of public housing, the improvement of educational facilities, and the building of roads and bridges.

== Games ==
Lotteries in Japan are divided into five blocs: National bloc, Tokyo bloc, Kantō-Chūbu-Tōhoku bloc, Kinki bloc, and Western Japan bloc.

=== Jumbo Lottery ===
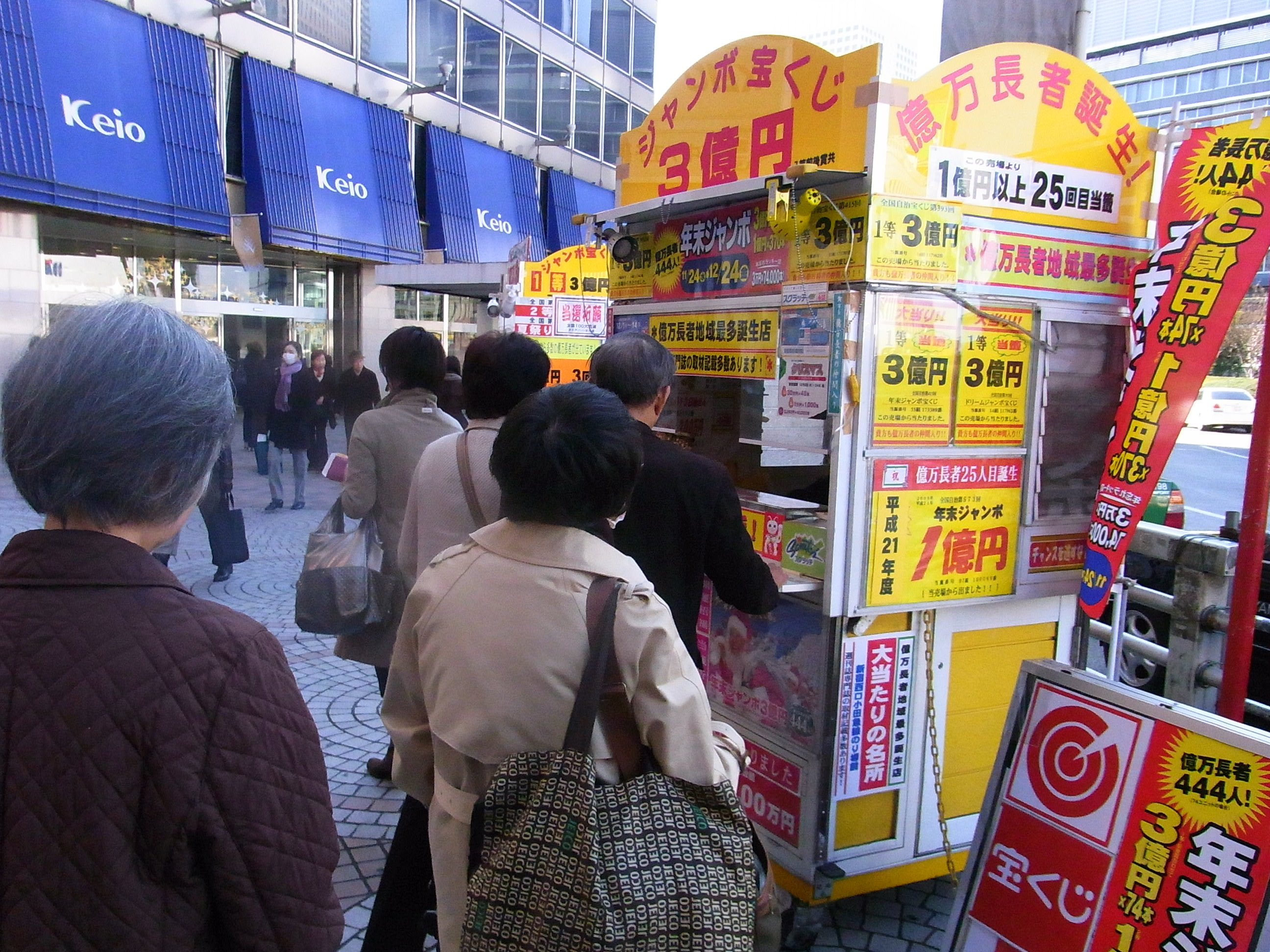
Year-end Jumbo Lottery shop in Shibuya

Jumbo Lottery (ジャンボ宝くじ) is a "high-prize lottery" in Japan held five times a year. The Valentine Jumbo Lottery (バレンタインジャンボ宝くじ), which is held every February and March; Dream Jumbo Lottery (ドリームジャンボ宝くじ), which is held every April and May; Summer Jumbo Lottery (サマージャンボ宝くじ), which is held every July and August; Halloween Jumbo Lottery (ハロウィンジャンボ宝くじ), which is held every October and November; and Year-end Jumbo Lottery (年末ジャンボ宝くじ), held every November and December. The prize money for Jumbo Lottery varies depending on the draw.

=== Numbers ===
Numbers (ナンバーズ) is a lottery in which players choose either three numbers from 0 to 9 for Numbers 3 or four numbers for Numbers 4. The specific combination of these digits determines the winning numbers. The ticket for the game costs ¥200 (US$1.26), and the draw takes place from Monday to Friday, during the New Year's holiday. There are four ways to play:

- Straight (ストレート): The numbers must match in the exact order to win. This bet offers the highest prize of around ¥100,000 (US$631.65)
- Box (ボックス): The three selected digits match the winning numbers, regardless of their order.
- Set (セット): A combination of straight and box, where the bet is half straight and half box. It wins if either the straight or Box condition is met.
- Mini (ミニ): The last two digits must match in the exact order.

=== Mini Loto ===
Mini Loto (ミニロト) is a lottery where the player selects five distinct numbers from a range of 1 to 31. The winning tiers, which are from first to fourth prize, are determined by how many of the player's chosen numbers match the five "main numbers" and one "bonus number" drawn. The ticket for the game costs ¥200 (US$1.26), and the draw takes place every Tuesday, excluding during the New Year's holiday. In theory, the maximum first prize is ¥10 million (US$63,164.81), the second prize is ¥150,000 (US$947.47), the third prize is ¥10,000 (US$63.16), and the fourth prize is ¥1,000 (US$6.32). The prizes vary each time depending on the sales amount and the number of winning tickets.

=== Sports lottery ===
Sports Promotion Lottery (スポーツ振興くじ, Supōtsu Shinkō-kuji) is a sports lottery run by the Japan Sports Council, a special corporation under the jurisdiction of the Ministry of Education, Culture, Sports, Science and Technology. It was established in the spring of 2000 under the Sports Betting Law and was launched in 2001. It was initially aimed at J-League with Soccer-kuji (サッカーくじ) or Toto. Soccer-kuji was divided into two types: Toto, where the participants predict the result of the game, and TotoGOAL, where the participants predict the goals scored. In the fall of 2022, a prediction-based lottery was established aimed at B.League.

== Statistics ==
Lottery is the most played game of chance in Japan. By fiscal year 2011, the Ministry of Internal Affairs and Communications reported that Japanese people spent around ¥1 trillion (2011) (equivalent to ¥1.15 trillion or US$7.58 billion in 2024) on the national and sports lotteries every year. Although sales has been dropped by 30% from 2005, and by 2024, lottery sales in Japan was about ¥760 billion (US$4.8 billion).

== Incidents ==
On December 21, 1976, unrest occurred in various cities across Japan, including Matsumoto, Nagano and Fukuoka, due to the start of sales of tickets for that year's Year-end Jumbo Lottery. The chaos resulted in more than 30 injuries and two deaths.

== See also ==
- Lotteries by country
- Gambling in Japan
- Pachinko
- O-mikuji
