= Kyōkō-ji =

Kyōkō-ji 教興寺
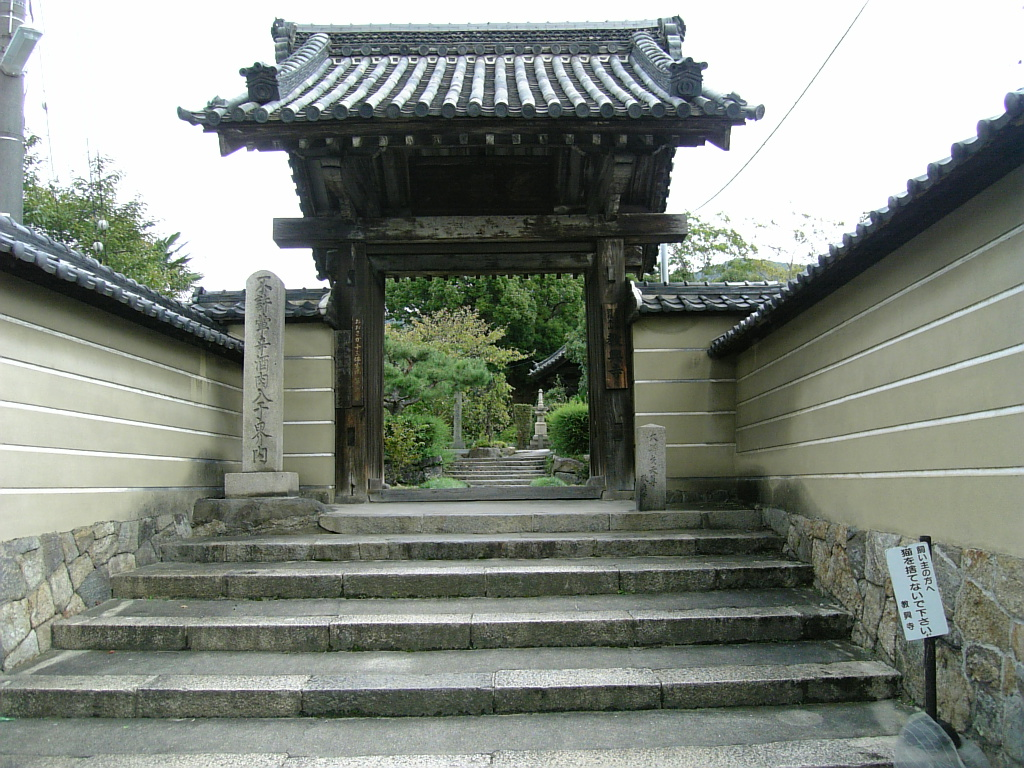
- Main gate

Religion
- Affiliation: Shingon Ritsu
- Deity: Miroku Bosatsu (Maitreya)
- Status: Special head temple

Location
- Location: 7-12 Kyōkō-ji, Yao, Osaka Prefecture
- Country: Japan
- Interactive map of Kyōkō-ji 教興寺
- Coordinates: 34°37′8.21″N 135°38′10.99″E

Architecture
- Founder: Hata no Kawakatsu and Prince Shōtoku (acc. legend)
- Completed: 588

Website
- http://www.hozanji.com/ (Japanese)

Kyōkō-ji (教興寺) is a Buddhist temple in Yao, Osaka Prefecture, Japan. It was founded in 588.

On May 19–20, 1562, it was the location of the Battle of Kyōkōji.

== See also ==
- Thirteen Buddhist Sites of Osaka
