= All Japan Young Buddhist Association =

Japanese youth organization

- 全日本仏教青年会
- Abbreviation: JYBA
- Formation: 1977
- Location: Japan
- Affiliations: World Fellowship of Buddhist Youth

The All Japan Young Buddhist Association (JYBA; Japanese: 全日本仏教青年会 Zen Nippon Bukkyō Seinen Kai) is a Japanese youth organization which unites various traditional Buddhist sects (dentō bukkyō) across 20,000 temples throughout the country. Among its main activities is the attendance of traditional festivals, international exchange, and disaster relief.

== Overview ==
Founded in 1977, the organisation sought to cross denominational and geographical boundaries and unites a number of different sects and works throughout the country. Currently, the organisation is affiliated with nine sects: Tendai, Kimpusen-Shugendō, the Wa sect, Shingon, Jōdo Shinshū (Pure Land), Yuzu Nembutsu, Rinzai Zen, Sōtō Zen, and Nichiren-shū. In addition, it is also affiliated with the prefectural Buddhist youth associations of Saitama, Kanagawa, Osaka, and Kobe. The organisation is affiliated with the World Fellowship of Buddhist Youth (WFBY), and as such it seeks to promote Buddhist culture and unity in addition to world peace.

The association's membership is heavily concentrated with priests under the age of forty-five. Many of their meetings in recent decades have focused on issues such as the state of Buddhism in the country, the phenomenon of "funeral Buddhism" (sōshiki bukkyō, a term used to describe the modern tendency to only seek out Buddhist priests for funerals), the extent to which priests should be more involved in the socio-political arena, and ways in which young priests can integrate Buddhist teachings into their daily lives.
