= Senkō-ji =

- 全興寺
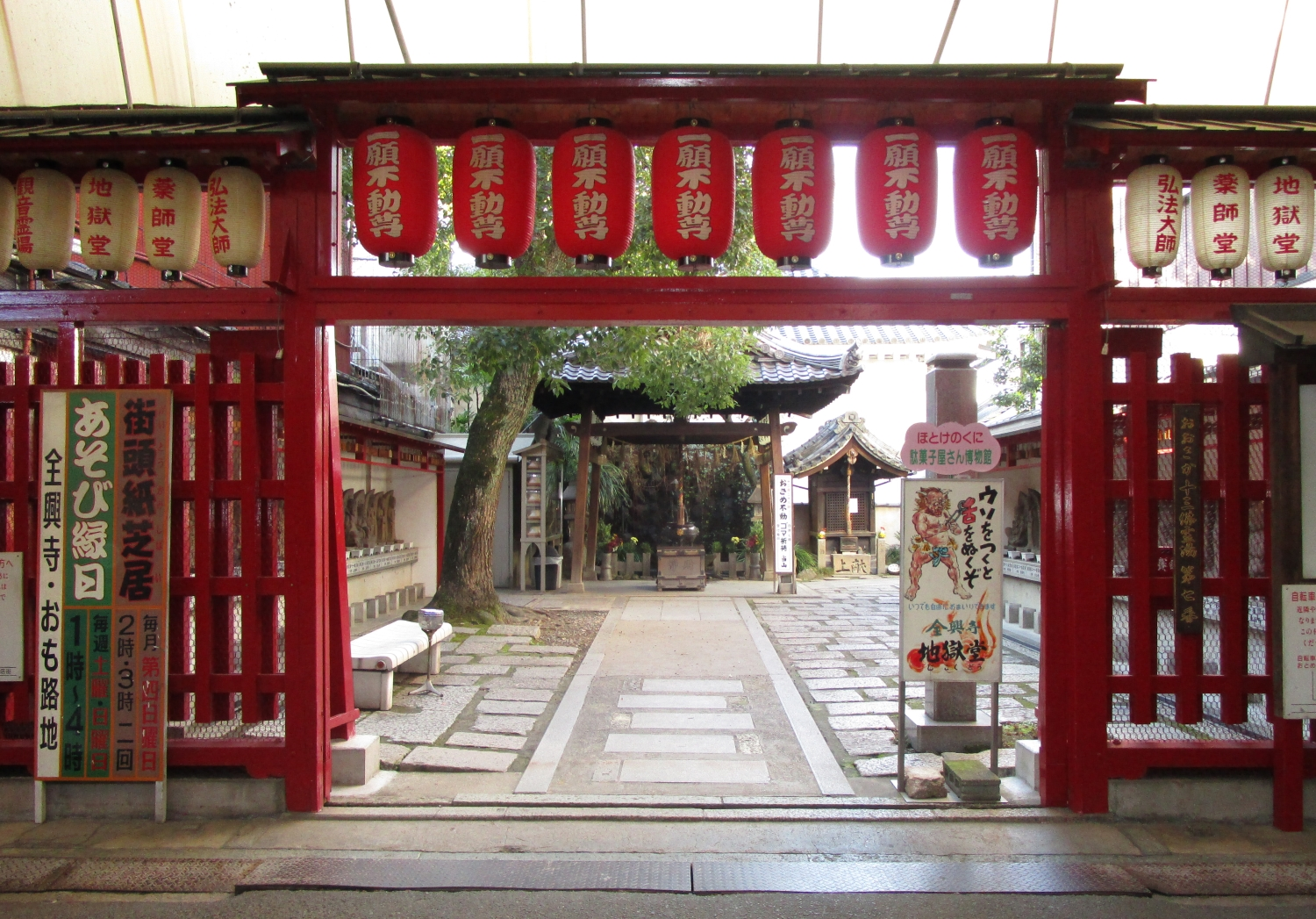
- North Gate

- Location within Osaka Prefecture

Religion
- Affiliation: Buddhism
- Prefecture: Osaka Prefecture

Location
- Location: Hirano-ku, Osaka, Japan
- Municipality: Osaka
- Interactive map of Senkō-ji
- Prefecture: Osaka Prefecture
- Coordinates: 34.6234°N 135.5553°E

Architecture
- Type: Buddhist Temple
- Founder: Prince Shōtoku

Website
- www.senkouji.net

Senkō-ji (全興寺) is a Buddhist temple in Hirano-ku, Osaka Prefecture, Japan.

== See also ==
- Thirteen Buddhist Sites of Osaka
