= Shōren-ji =

Buddhist temple in Tennōji-ku, Japan

Coordinates: 34°39′38″N 135°30′47″E

Shōren-ji (青蓮寺) is a Buddhist temple in Tennōji-ku, Osaka Prefecture, Japan. It was founded by Prince Shōtoku, and is affiliated with Kōyasan Shingon-shū.

== See also ==
- Thirteen Buddhist Sites of Osaka
