= 1976 Jumbo Lottery chaos =

1976 chaos in Japan

- Part of 1970s Japanese recession
- Date: December 21, 1976
- Location: Japan
- Type: Civil unrest
- Cause: Excitement for the Year-end Jumbo Lottery, economic troubles
- Deaths: 2
- Injuries: >30

On December 21, 1976, the sale of the Year-end Jumbo Lottery in Japan caused widespread unrest and chaos in major cities such as Tokyo, Osaka, Fukuoka and Matsumoto, resulting in two deaths and more than 40 injuries.

== Background ==
Year-end Jumbo Lottery is a year-end national lottery in Japan. The Year-end Jumbo Lottery grand prize in December 1976 was ¥10 million (1976) (equivalent to ¥18.66 million or US$123,292.42 in 2024) each and was given to 40 winners. There were also bonus prizes totalling around ¥20 million (1976) (equivalent to ¥37.32 million or US$246,584.84 in 2024). Due to the recession in Japan caused by the 1973 oil crisis, which caused high unemployment and an increase in the cost of living, many people wanted to win the lottery.

About 7,300 locations across Japan, including 17 special locations, were designated to sell lottery tickets on December 21, 1976. The draw was scheduled to be held on New Year’s Eve.

== Chaos ==
Due to the number of people in the crowds, many lottery booths in Japan started to sell tickets earlier than the scheduled start time of 7:00 am. Many booths also extended their sales period for two to three hours. Lines in some areas were miles long. The crowds' anger erupted after people cut in line, and riot police were deployed.

Despite the freezing weather, 7,000 people lined up for three days before the release of the tickets at Korakuen Stadium in Tokyo. The number of people waiting grew to about 30,000 on the day of the release on December 21, 1976. The sales of tickets were temporarily suspended. Two people were injured. The crowd around a makeshift booth in Ogimachi Park in Osaka exceeded 40,000 people. People started cutting in line and descended into chaos. A 33-year-old man was arrested for arson after trying to set the booth on fire.

In Matsumoto in Nagano Prefecture, the crowd grew to around 7,500 people in front of the Nagano Prefectural Workers' Welfare Center, and the Matsumoto branch of Dai-Ichi Kangyo Bank distributed 1,900 numbered tickets in advance, but when those who did not receive a ticket rushed to the counter all at once, it caused widespread chaos. A 77-year-old man suffered a stroke and died. According to Matsumoto Police Station, the man suffered a stroke due to excitement from obtaining a lottery ticket.

In Heiwadai Stadium in Fukuoka, the crowd grew to around 40,000 people. The sales started at around 3:45. After people started shouting "They've started selling!" (売り始めた！), which caused chaos, people broke the line and rushed towards the sales booth. A 42-year-old man also died after suffering a heart attack. Additionally, 13 people were injured. In Kitakyushu, around 10,000 people crowded into the Kokura Velodrome and began pushing and shoving others towards the ticket counters, which resulted in four people being injured. The sales were temporarily suspended. In Hiroshima, the line reached around 10,000 people. Around 150 policemen, including riot squads, were also deployed. However, no injuries were reported. According to Japanese authorities, similar chaos occurred in 27 other places across Japan.

== Aftermath ==
Two people died in the chaos, while in total, more than 30 to 40 people were injured across Japan, mostly suffering from blood loss and broken bones. Following the chaos, a reservation system using return postcards was introduced in 1979.
