= Ryōnin =

12th-century Japanese Buddhist monk; founder of Yuzu Nembutsu

Ryōnin (良忍)
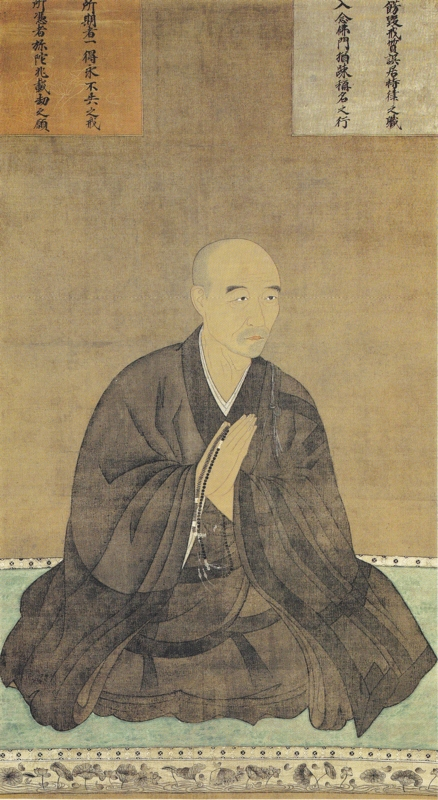
- Portrait of Ryōnin
- Title: Founder of Yuzu Nembutsu

Personal life
- Born: January 1 (February 10), 1073
- Died: February 1 (February 19), 1132
- Posthumous name: Shōō daishi (聖応大師)

Religious life
- Religion: Buddhism
- School: Yuzu Nembutsu
- Lineage: Tendai

Ryōnin (良忍, 1072–1132) was a Tendai Buddhist monk in the late Heian period and the founder of the Yuzu Nembutsu sect.

Ryōnin was born the son of Tomita no Shō (富田 荘), the feudal lord of Owari Province. When he was young, he was called Yoshihito (良仁). At the age of 12, he left home and began studying Buddhism near Mount Hiei. After his education, he worked in the Jitsuhōbō (実報房) as a temple priest (Nembutsu choir priest), who continuously practiced nembutsu in the Jōgyō-Sanmaidō Hall (常行三昧堂), where Amida Buddha is the main object of worship.

In later years, Yoshihito retired to Ōhara on the outskirts of Kyoto, called himself Ryōnin, and began a life in which he recited a portion of the Lotus Sutra and the nembutsu 60,000 times a day as a priest and practiced it as a method of incantation in the morning, at noon, and at sunset. According to the illustrated text scroll "Yūzū−Nembutsu Engi Emaki" (融通念仏縁起絵巻), which was produced in 1314 during the Kamakura period, when the idea of the Yūzū−Nembutsu was completed and spread, Ryōnin was immersed in Amida Buddha at the age of 46 and taught Nembutsu to the people. He realized that the Nembutsu led the common people to reach enlightenment more quickly.

At the request of the retired emperor Toba, Ryōnin built the Dainenbutsu-ji temple in 1127. Ryōnin is also known for reciting the "Tendai Shōmyō" (天台声明), the musical tradition of the Tendai school of Buddhism, as a sutra and for reviving and systematizing it as "Ōhara Shōmyō" (大原魚山声明). He died in 1132 in the Ōhararaigō-in temple (大原来迎院) at the age of 61.

Ryōnin's teaching was focused on the view that one's nenbutsu recitation was interrelated to that of all other people and that this interconnection of all nenbutsu recitations helped all beings attain birth in the Pure Land. Thus, he would teach: "One person is all people; all people are one person; one practice is all practices; all practices are one practice."

In this tradition, from the 14th century onwards, Yūzū-Nembutsu teachings became important, which emphasized the power of the Nembutsu of people and not the power of vows to Amida Buddha. In 1773, Ryōnin was posthumously named Shōō Daishi (聖応大師).
