= Hōon'in =

Buddhist temple in Osaka Prefecture, Japan

- 報恩院
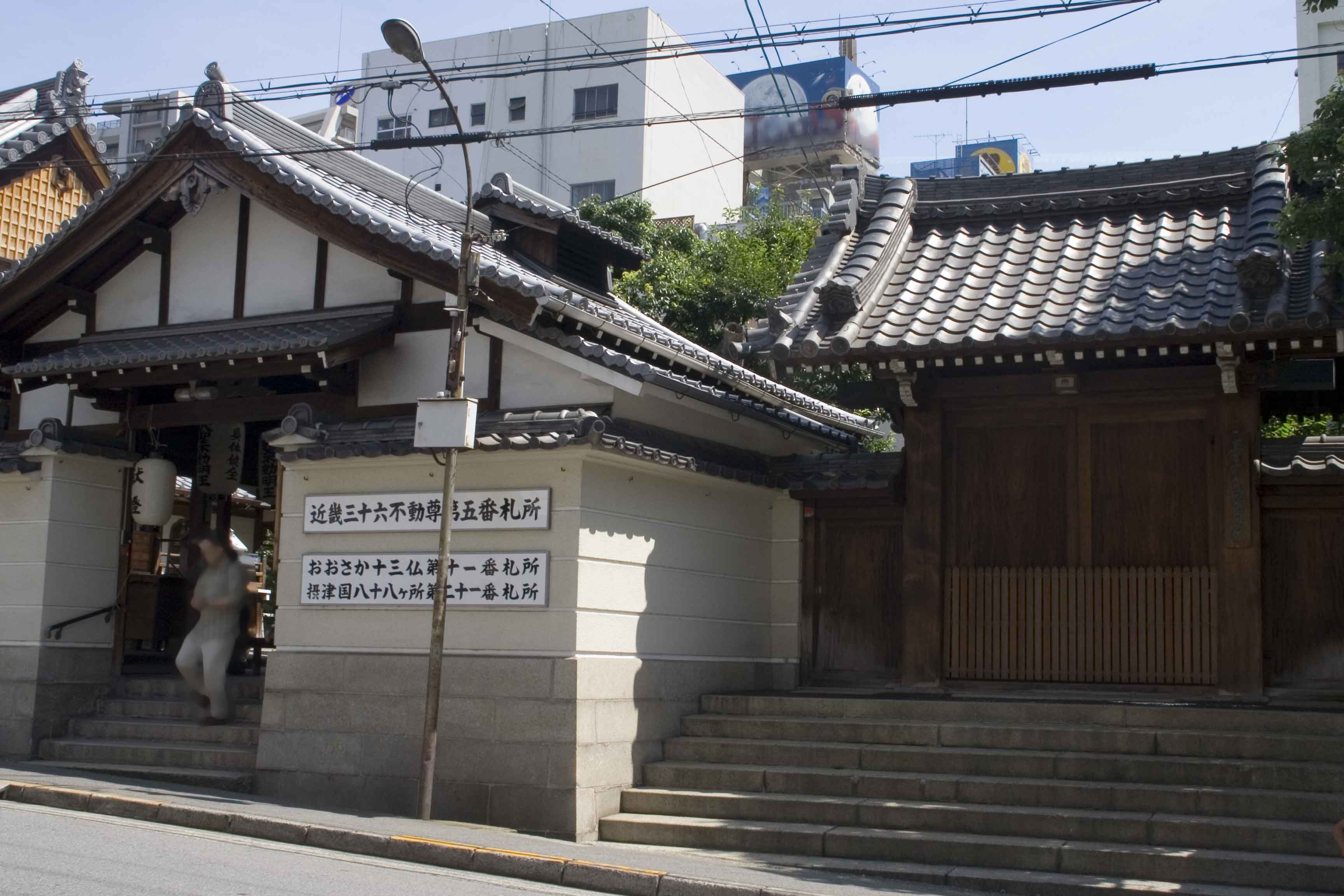
- Entry

- Location within Osaka Prefecture

Religion
- Affiliation: Buddhism
- Sect: Mahayana
- Prefecture: Osaka Prefecture

Location
- Location: Chūō-ku, Osaka, Japan
- Municipality: Osaka
- Interactive map of Hōon'in
- Prefecture: Osaka Prefecture
- Coordinates: 34.6671°N 135.5136°E

Architecture
- Type: Buddhist Temple
- Founder: Ryōhen
- Established: Kanbun Era; 1661–1672

Website
- shj.main.jp/temple21.html

Hōon'in (報恩院) is a Buddhist temple in Chūō-ku, Osaka Prefecture, Japan. It was founded in the Kanbun Era, 1661–1672.

== See also ==
- Thirteen Buddhist Sites of Osaka
