= Thirteen Buddhist Sites of Osaka =

Thirteen Buddhist Sites of Osaka（おおさか十三仏霊場, Osaka jūsan butsu reijō）are a group of 13 Buddhist sacred sites in Osaka Prefecture dedicated to the Thirteen Buddhas. The majority of the temples in this grouping are part of Japanese esoteric Shingon Buddhism. The pilgrimage group was established in 1979.

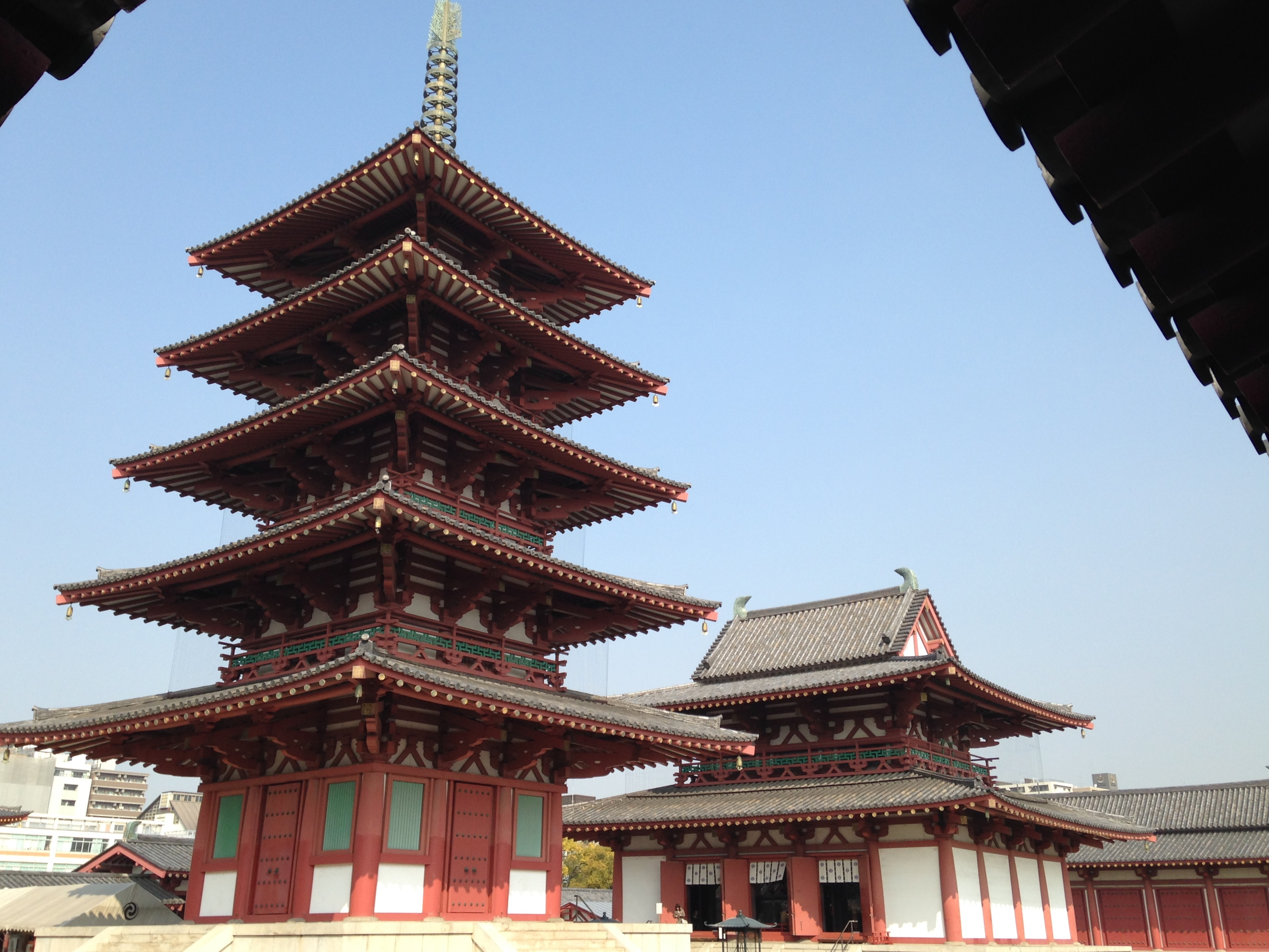
Shitenno-ji

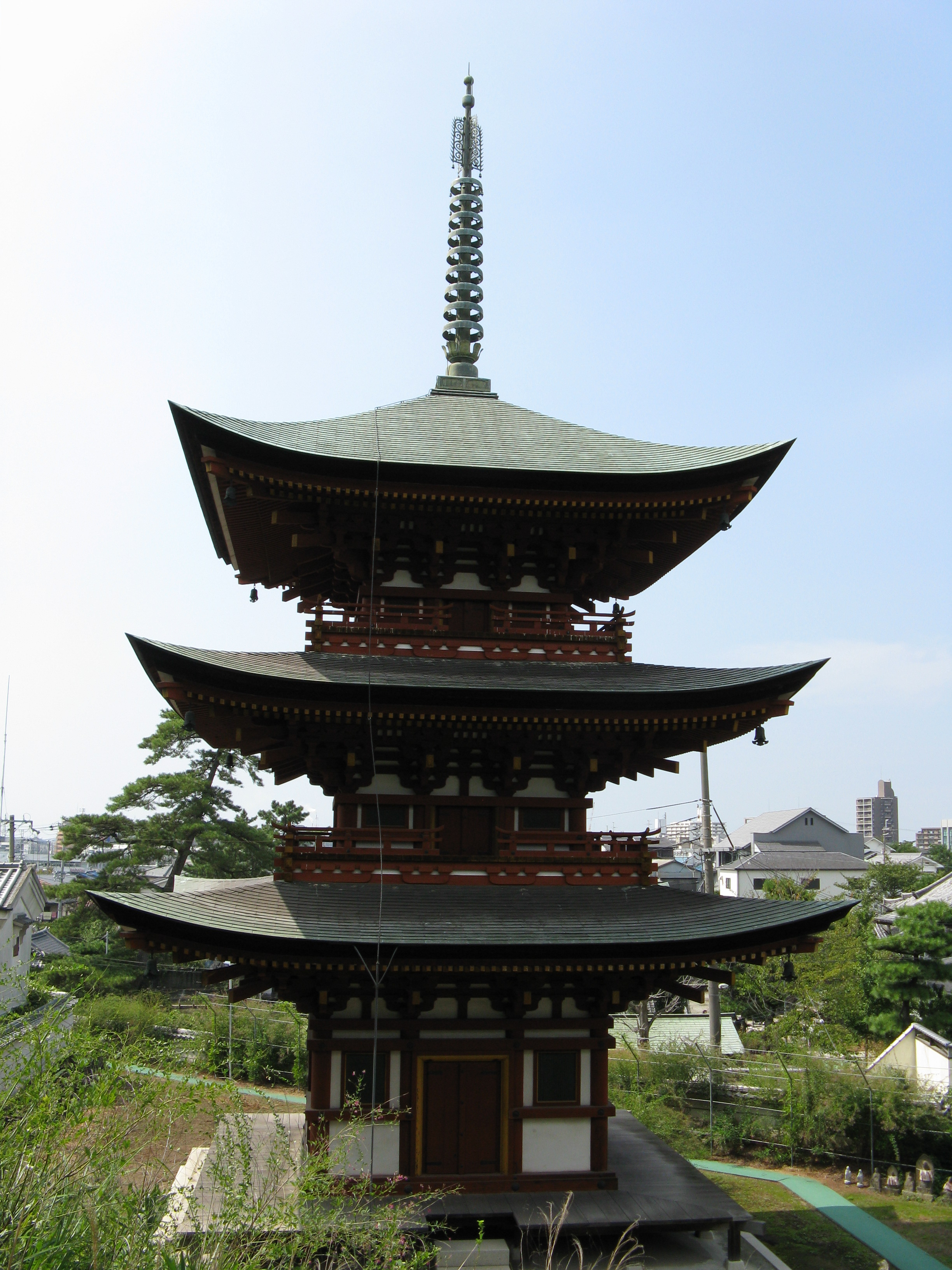
Ebara-ji

== Directory ==
| Number | Temple | Sect | Dedication | Location |
|---|---|---|---|---|
| 1 | Horaku-ji | Sennyū-ji Shingon | Fudō-myōō | Osaka, Higashisumiyoshi-ku, Yamasaka 1-8-30 |
| 2 | Shōen-ji | Tō-ji Shingon | Shaka Nyorai | Osaka, Abeno-ku, Matsumushidōri 3-2-32 |
| 3 | Ebara-ji | Kōyasan Shingon-shū | Monju Bosatsu | Osaka, Sakai-shi, Nishi-ku, Ebarajichō |
| 4 | Shitennō-ji | Wa-shu | Fugen Bosatsu | Osaka, Tennoji-ku, Shitennō-ji 1-11-18 |
| 5 | Jōkō-ji | Nanzen-ji Rinzai | Jizō Bosatsu | Yao, Honmachi 5-8-1 |
| 6 | Kyōkō-ji | Risshū | Miroku Bosatsu | Yao, Kyōkō-ji 7-21 |
| 7 | Senkō-ji | Kōyasan Shingon-shū | Yakushi Nyorai | Osaka, Hirano-ku, Hirano Honmachi 4-12-21 |
| 8 | Taiyū-ji | Kōyasan Shingon-shū | Kannon Bosatsu | Osaka, Kita-ku, Taiyū-ji 3-7 |
| 9 | Kokubun-ji | Kokubun-ji Shingon | Seishi Bosatsu | Osaka, Kita-ku, Kokubun-ji 1-6-18 |
| 10 | Dainenbutsu-ji | Seishi Bosatsu | Amida Nyorai | Osaka, Hirano-ku, Hirano Uemachi 1-7-26 |
| 11 | Hōon'in | Daigo Shingon | Ashuku Nyorai | Osaka, Chūō-ku, Takatsu 1-2-28 |
| 12 | Shōren-ji | Kōyasan Shingon-shū | Dainichi Nyorai | Osaka, Tennoji-ku, Ikutamatera 3-19 |
| 13 | Taihei-ji | Sōtō | Kokūzō Bosatsu | Osaka, Tennoji-ku, Yuhigaokacho 1-1 |

== See also ==
- Thirteen Buddhas
