= Ebara-ji =

Buddhist temple in Nishi-ku, Japan

Coordinates: 34.5375°N 135.4747°E

- 家原寺
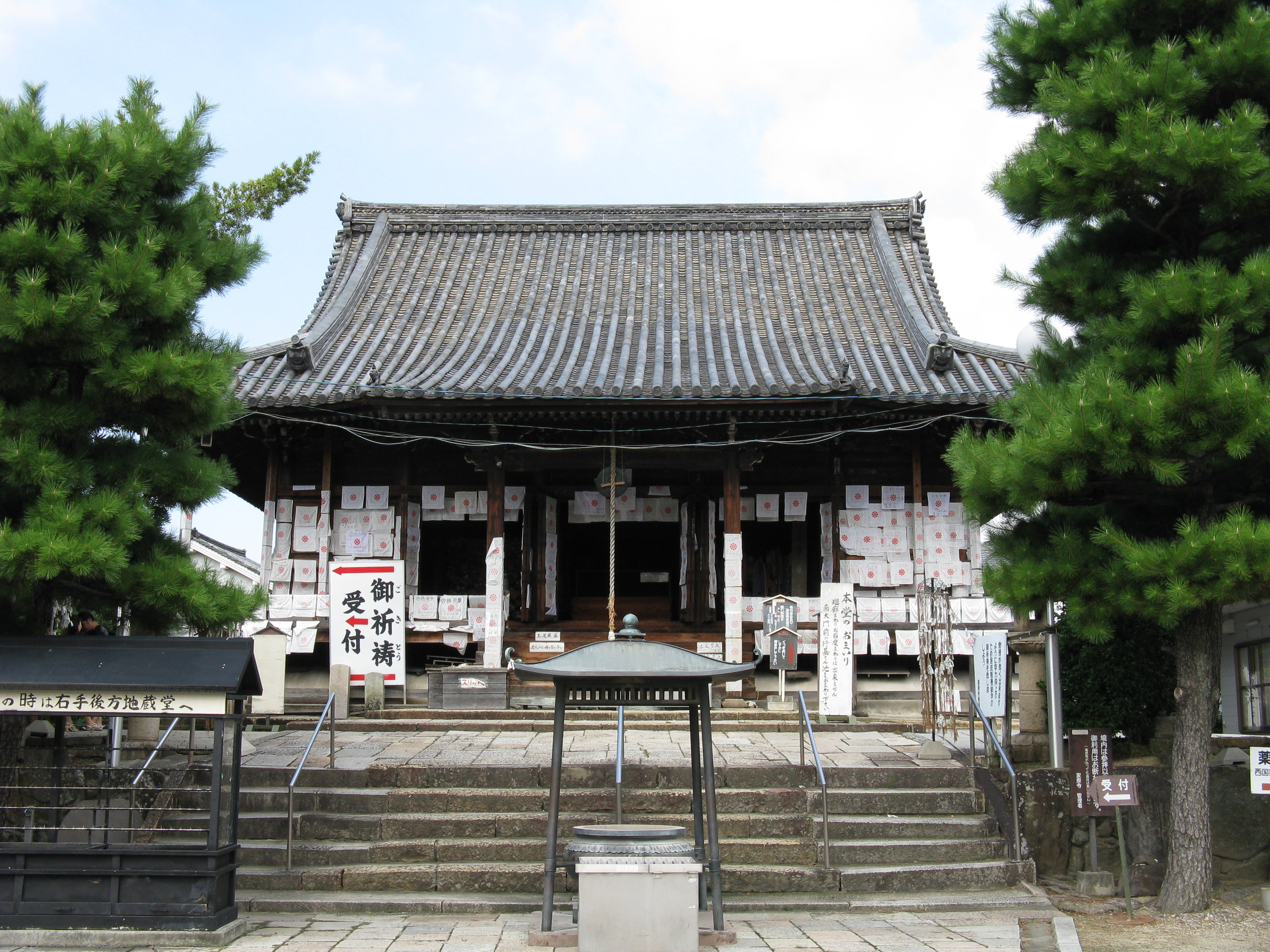
- Main hall

Religion
- Affiliation: Kōya-san Shingon
- Deity: Monju Bosatsu (Mañjuśrī)

Location
- Location: 1-8-21 Osaka Prefecture Sakai, Nishi-ku, Ebaraji-cho
- Country: Japan
- Interactive map of Ebara-ji

Architecture
- Founder: Gyōki
- Completed: 704

Ebara-ji (家原寺) is a Buddhist temple in Nishi-ku, Sakai, Osaka Prefecture, Japan. It is affiliated with Kōyasan Shingon-shū. The central icon is the Bodhisattva, Monju (Mañjuśrī).

== History ==
According to temple legend the temple was founded in 704. It was the birthplace of the Buddhist monk Gyōki.

== Pilgrimages ==
- Thirteen Buddhist Sites of Osaka #3
- 18 Ancient Pagodas #1
- Saigoku Yakushi 49 Sacred Sites #15

== See also ==
- Thirteen Buddhist Sites of Osaka
