= Dainenbutsu-ji =

Buddhist temple in Ōsaka, Japan

- 大念仏寺
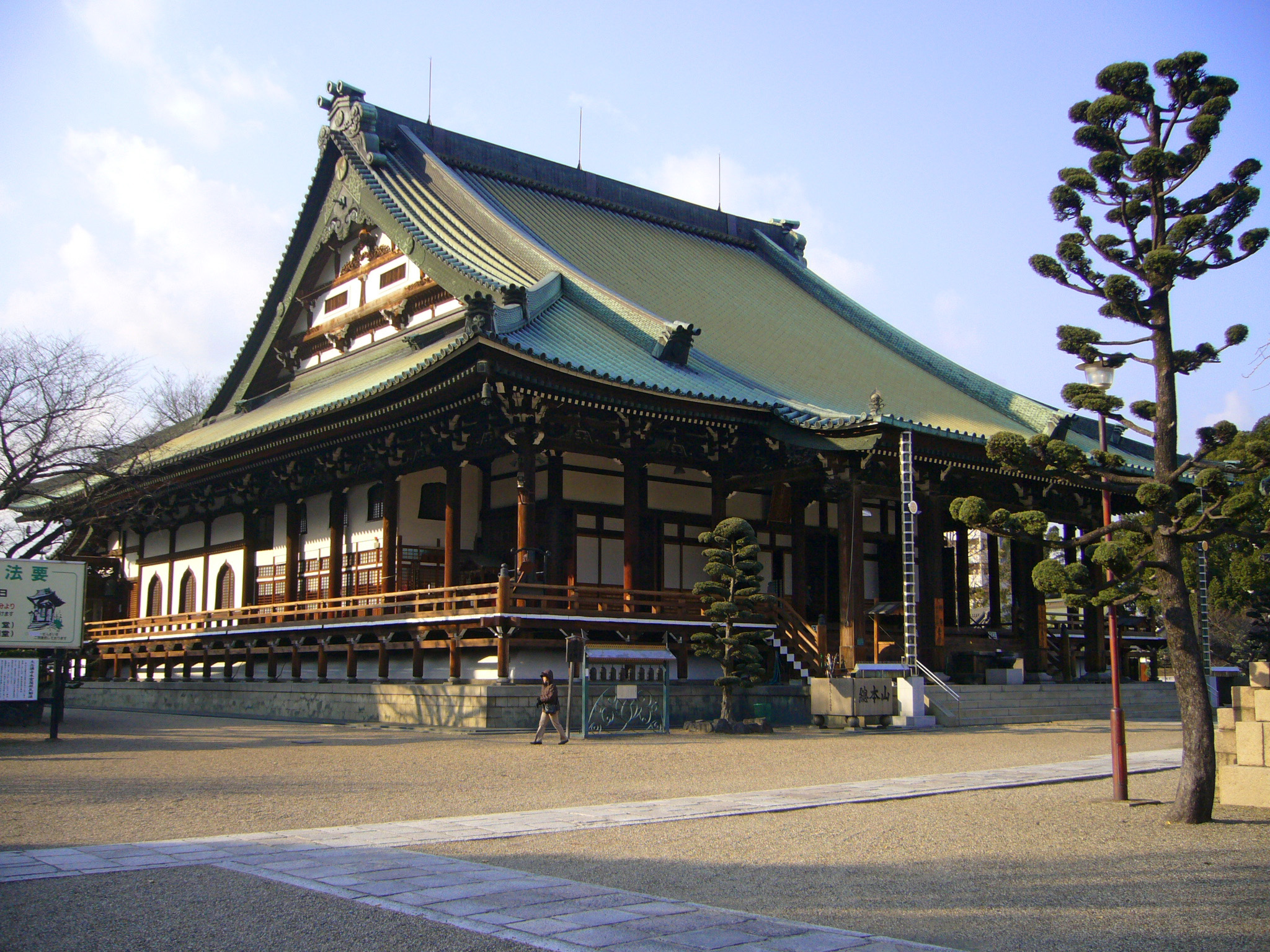
- Picture of Dainenbutu-ji

- Location within Osaka Prefecture

Religion
- Affiliation: Yuzu Nembutsu
- Prefecture: Osaka Prefecture

Location
- Location: Hirano-ku, Osaka, Japan
- Municipality: Osaka
- Interactive map of Dainenbutsu-ji
- Prefecture: Osaka Prefecture
- Coordinates: 34°37′38.08″N 135°33′1.79″E

Architecture
- Type: Buddhist Temple
- Founder: Ryōnin
- Established: 1127

Website
- www.dainenbutsuji.com

Dainenbutsu-ji (大念仏寺) is a Buddhist temple in Hirano-ku, Osaka, Japan. It was founded in 1127. It is the headquarters of the small Yuzu Nembutsu school of Pure Land Buddhism.

== See also ==
- Thirteen Buddhist Sites of Osaka
- List of National Treasures of Japan (writings: Chinese books)
