= Horaku-ji =

- 法楽寺
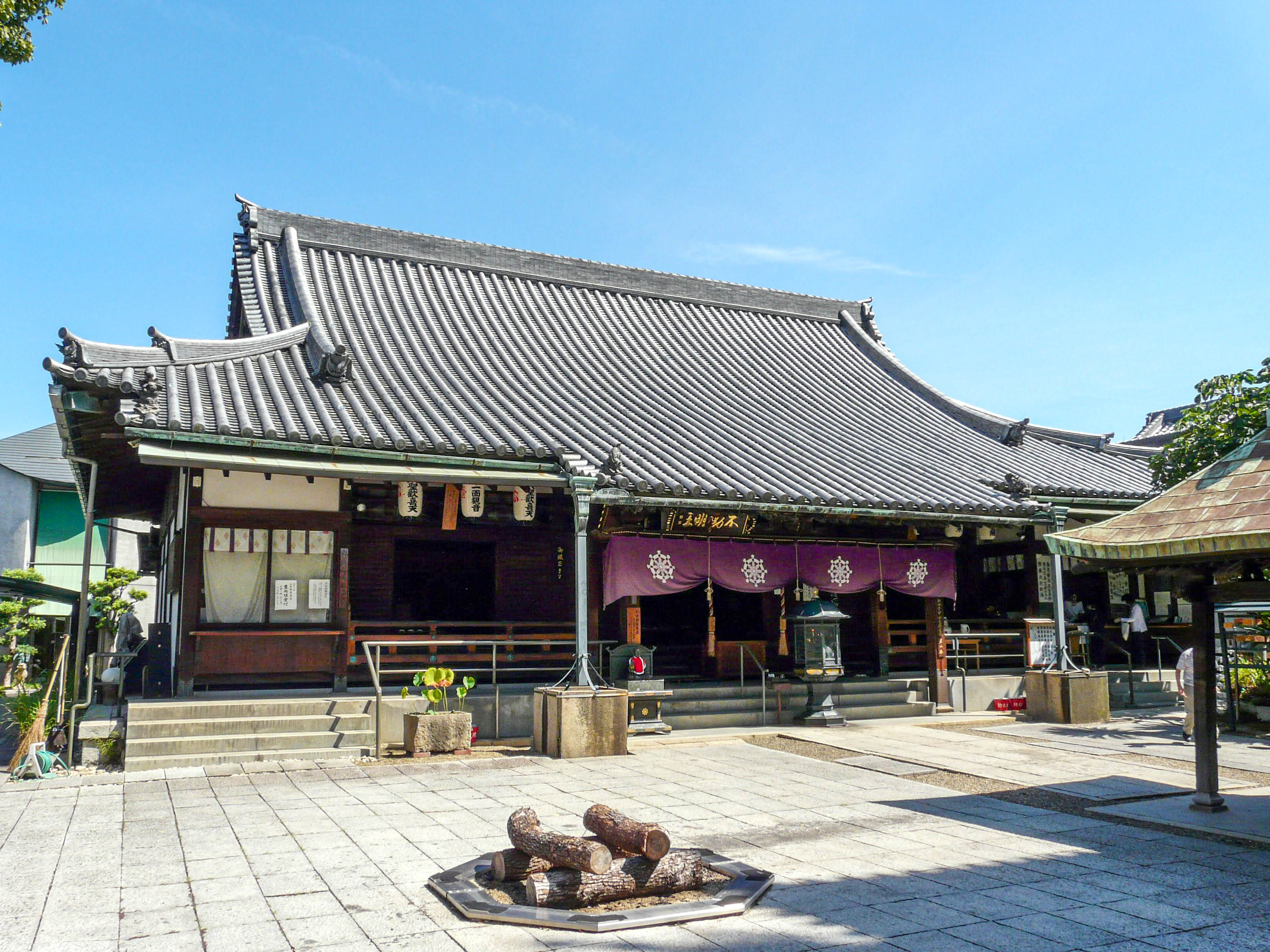
- Main Hall

- Location within Osaka Prefecture

Religion
- Affiliation: Buddhism
- Sect: Mahayana
- Prefecture: Osaka Prefecture

Location
- Location: Higashisumiyoshi-ku, Osaka, Japan
- Municipality: Osaka
- Interactive map of Horaku-ji
- Prefecture: Osaka Prefecture
- Coordinates: 34°37′35″N 135°31′23″E

Architecture
- Type: Buddhist Temple
- Founder: Taira no Shigemori
- Established: 1178

Website
- www.horakuji.com/index.htm

Hōraku-ji (法楽寺) is a Buddhist temple in Higashisumiyoshi-ku, Osaka, Japan. It was founded in 1178 by Taira no Shigemori.

== See also ==
- Thirteen Buddhist Sites of Osaka
