= Kokubun-ji (Osaka) =

- 国分寺
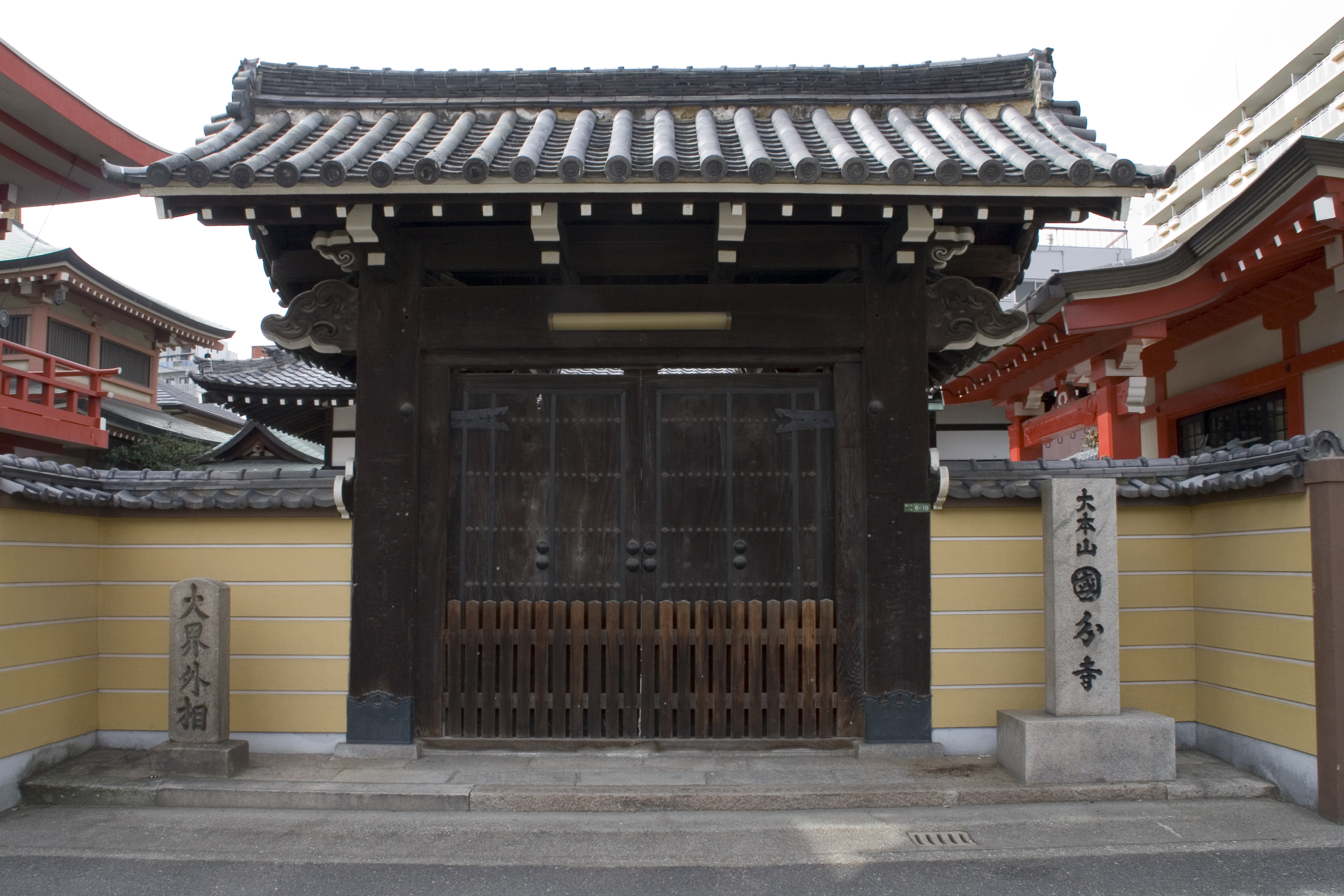
- Main gate

- Location within Osaka Prefecture

Religion
- Affiliation: Buddhism
- Sect: Mahayana
- Prefecture: Osaka Prefecture

Location
- Location: Kita-ku, Osaka, Japan
- Municipality: Osaka
- Interactive map of Kokubun-ji
- Prefecture: Osaka Prefecture
- Coordinates: 34°42′37″N 135°30′52″E

Architecture
- Type: Buddhist Temple
- Founder: Dōshō
- Established: 655

Website
- settu-kokubunji.jp

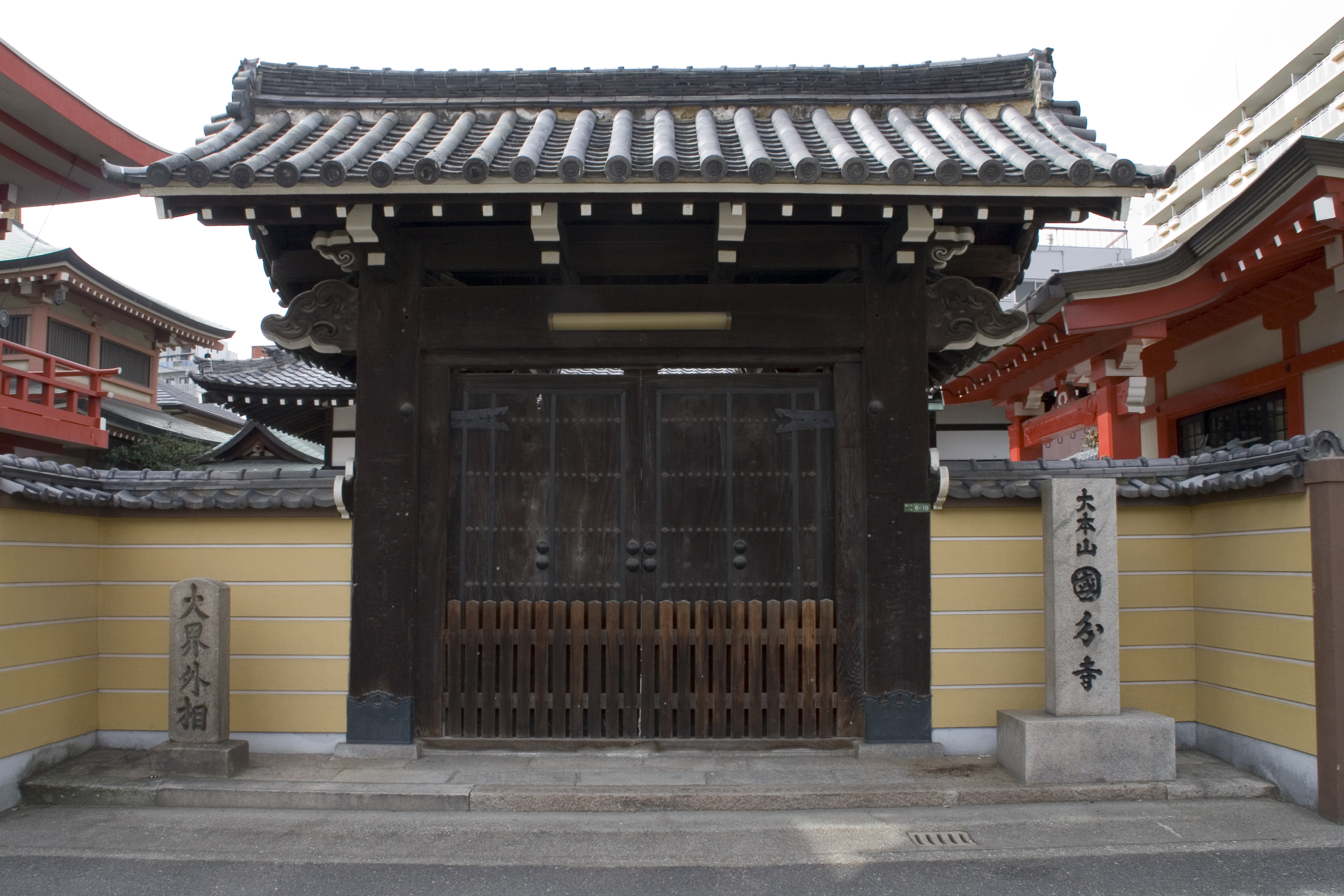
Entry gate

Kokubun-ji (国分寺) is a Buddhist temple in Kita-ku, Osaka, Osaka Prefecture, Japan. It was founded in 655 during the reign of Empress Kōgyoku, and is affiliated with Shingon Buddhism. It is also known as Nagara Kokubun-ji (長柄国分寺).

== See also ==
- Thirteen Buddhist Sites of Osaka
