= Shōen-ji =

Buddhist temple in Abeno-ku, Japan

Coordinates: 34.6354°N 135.5033°E

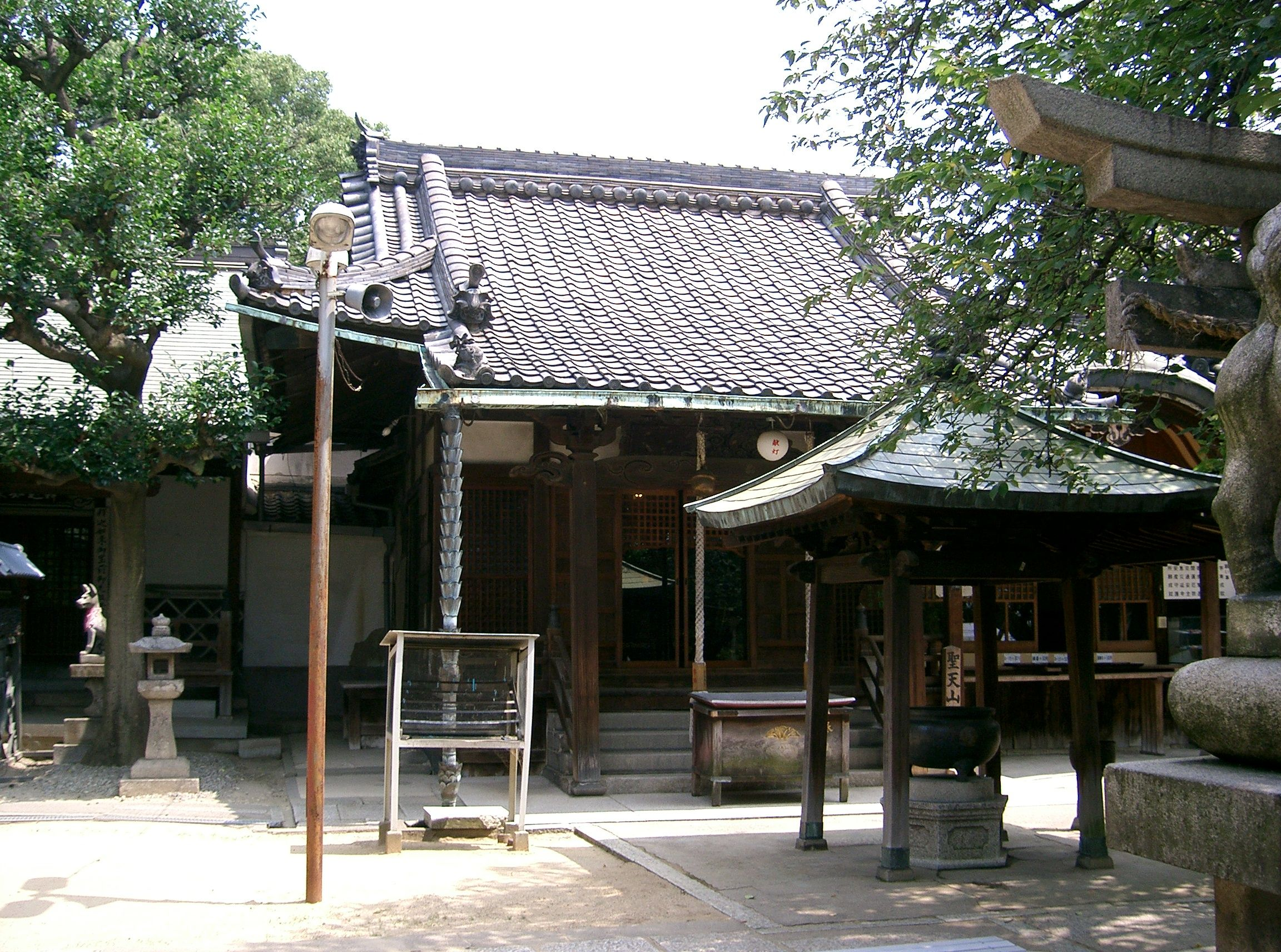
Main hall

Shōen-ji (正圓寺) is a Buddhist temple in Abeno-ku, Osaka Prefecture, Japan. It was founded in 939.

== See also ==
- Thirteen Buddhist Sites of Osaka
