= Taiyū-ji =

Buddhist temple in Osaka Prefecture, Japan

Coordinates: 34.7018°N 135.5041°E

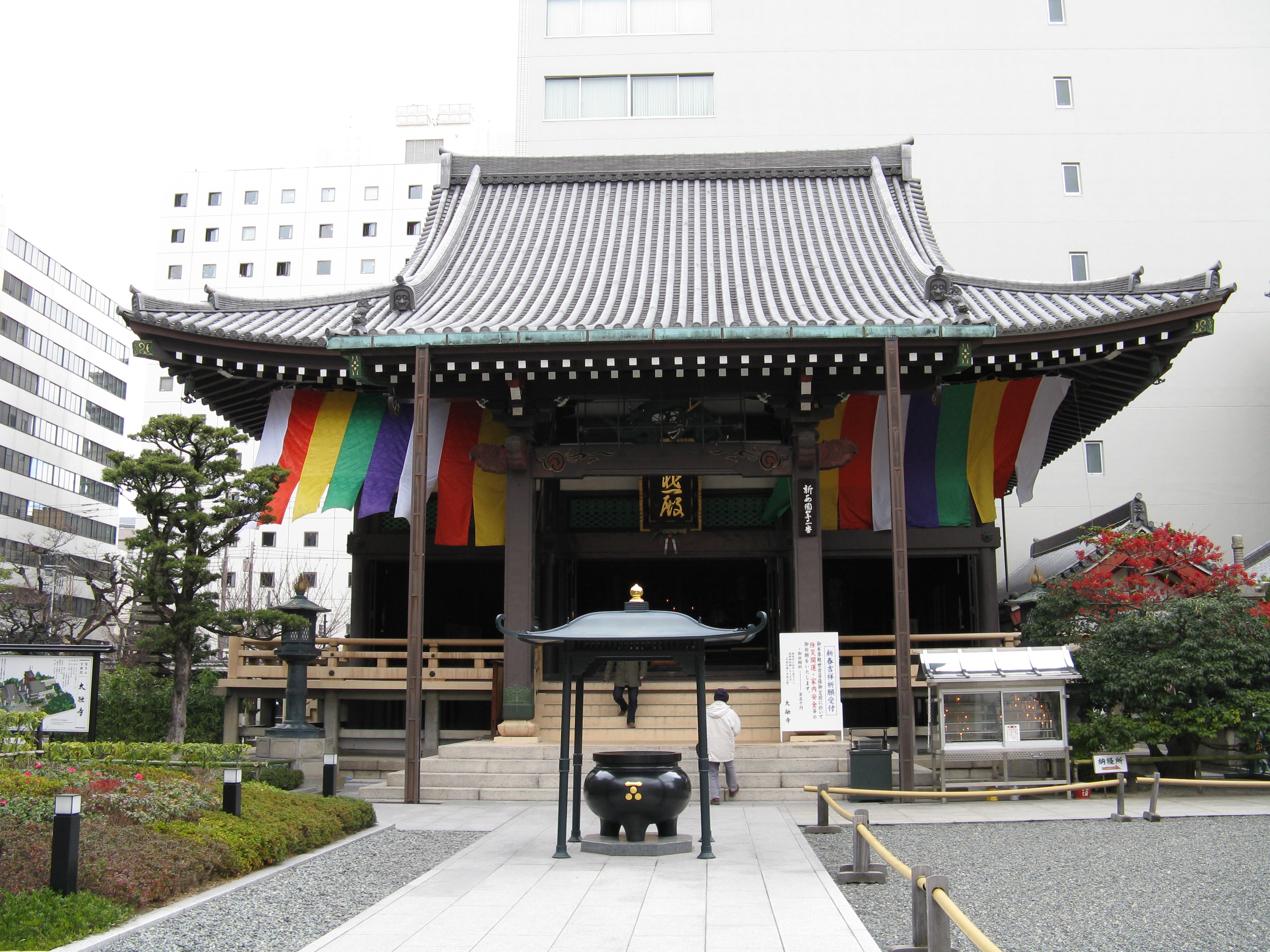
Main hall

Taiyū-ji (太融寺) is a Buddhist temple in Osaka Prefecture, Japan. It was founded in 821.

== See also ==
- Thirteen Buddhist Sites of Osaka
