= Battle of Kyōkōji =

- Part of the Sengoku period
Date	19–20 May 1562
Location	Kyōkōji temple, Japan 34°37′07″N 135°38′10″E
Result	Miyoshi victory

Belligerents
Miyoshi clan	Hatakeyama clan

Commanders and leaders
Miyoshi Nagayoshi	Hatakeyama Takamasa; Shima Sakon

Strength
60,000	40,000
- Location within Japan

The 1562 Battle of Kyōkōji (教興寺の戦い, no Tatakai) was one of many battles fought between the Miyoshi and Hatakeyama in Japan's Sengoku period. On 19–20 May of that year, the battle was won by Miyoshi Nagayoshi over Hatakeyama Takamasa.

== Works cited ==
- 弓倉弘年 (Yumikura Hirotoshi) (20 December 2006). 中世後期畿内近国守護の研究 [Research on the Shugo of Kinai and Nearby Provinces in the Late Middle Ages] (in Japanese). Seibundo Shuppan. ISBN 4-7924-0616-1.
