= Yuzu Nembutsu =

School of Pure Land Buddhism

- 融通念仏宗
- Dainenbutsu-ji, the head temple of Yuzu Nembutsu
- Classification: Pure Land Buddhism
- Headquarters: Dainenbutsu-ji
- Founder: Ryōnin
- Origin: 1117
- Branched from: Tendai
- Places of worship: 360

Yuzu Nembutsu (融通念仏宗, Yūzū-nenbutsu-shū) is a school of Pure Land Buddhism that focuses on the recitation of the Nembutsu, the name of the Amitabha Buddha. Followers believe this recitation benefits not just the chanter, but the entire world as well.

== History ==
The sect began in the twelfth century when a Tendai monk named Ryōnin (良忍, 1072–1132) wrote a commentary on rituals and hymns in practice at the time and founded the school in 1117, with its headquarters located at Dainenbutsu-ji in Osaka.

== Teaching ==
Yūzū Nembutsu emphasizes the nature of the interfusion and interpenetration of all phenomena and the collective spiritual power of practitioners through the recitation of the nembutsu. In this tradition, the recitation of the nembutsu is not merely an individual quest for salvation in the Pure Land, instead, a practitioner's nembutsu is considered to benefit all beings, and every other person's nembutsu chanting is said to benefit all other individuals.

The term "yūzū" (融通) is composed of two characters: "yū" (融), meaning "to dissolve or blend", and "zū" (通), meaning "to flow or pass through without obstruction". Yūzū Nembutsu teaches that all beings and phenomena possess distinct forms and functions yet remain interconnected in their existence. This idea can be illustrated through everyday examples: cement, sand, and water, which are fundamentally different materials, combine to create solid concrete when mixed appropriately. Similarly, numerous individual light bulbs in a room may emit their own distinct light, yet together they contribute to an overall illumination that enhances the entire space. Each element maintains its individuality while simultaneously contributing to a greater whole. This mutual dependence and harmonious interaction is central to the concept of yūzū.

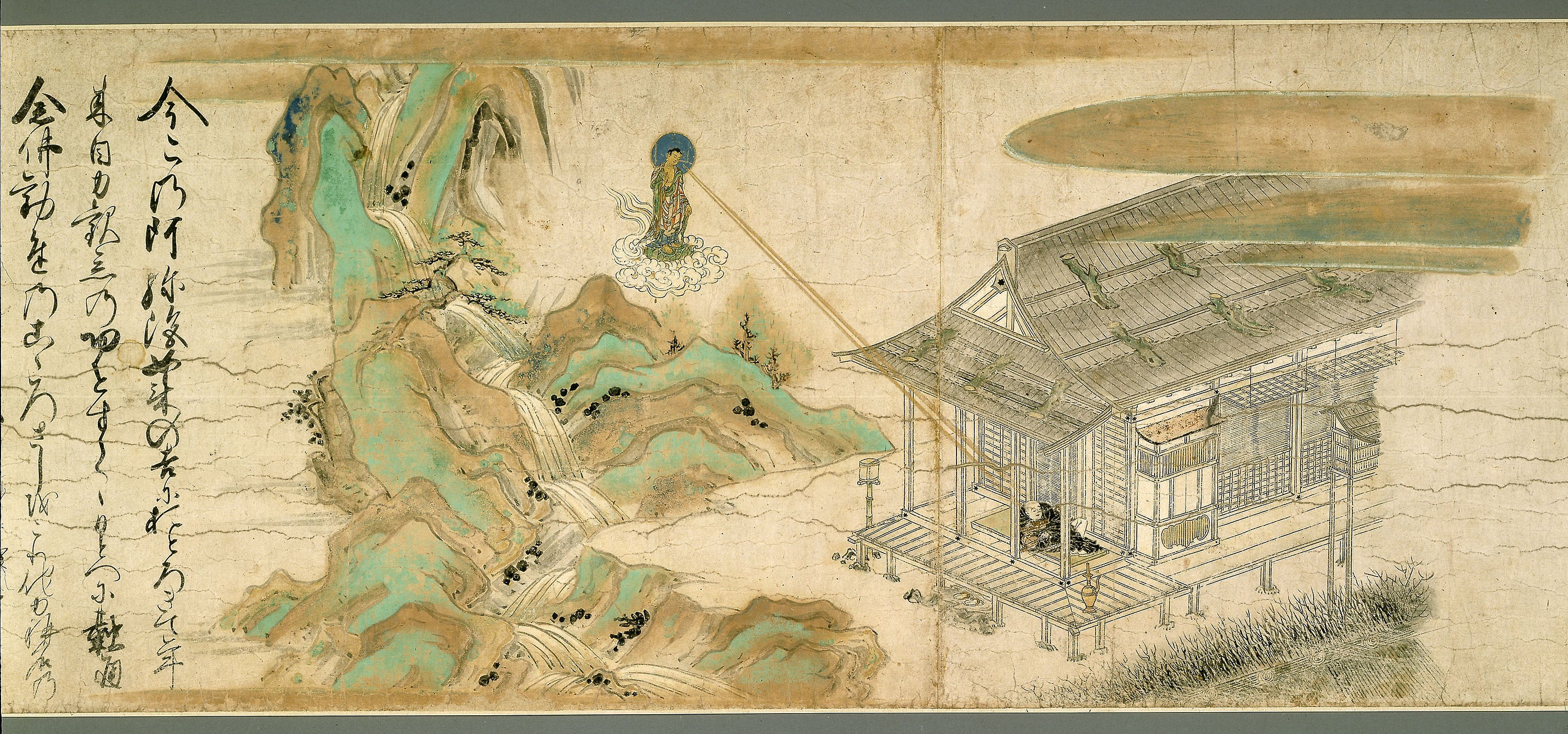
Amida's compassionate light shining on a Pure Land devotee, from Legends of the Yuzu Nembutsu Sect

The Yūzū Nembutsu tradition emphasizes that Nembutsu recited by one person is interconnected with the Nembutsu of all beings and with the compassionate vow of Amida Buddha. This reciprocal connection ensures that the spiritual benefit of one person’s practice extends to all sentient beings, while the merits of others' practices return to support the individual. This relationship is described as "Other-Power Rebirth" (他力往生), reflecting the belief that Amida Buddha's vow and universal compassion enable practitioners to be born in the Pure Land. The primary image of veneration in Yūzū Nembutsu Shū is the "Jūichison Tentoku Amida Nyorai" (十一尊天得阿弥陀如来), viewed as a Dharma-body Buddha embodying universal truth. The vow of Amida Buddha is regarded as the fundamental force that sustains existence itself, providing life to all beings.

In this tradition, the Pure Land is not perceived just as a distant realm but also as an inherent reality within the practitioner's mind. This idea is expressed through the concepts of "Pure Land within the Mind" (唯心淨土) and "Amida within the Self" (己心弥陀). The former asserts that the Pure Land is accessible within one's own consciousness, while the latter teaches that one's true nature is fundamentally identical to Amida Buddha. The practice of reciting the Nembutsu is seen as a means to awaken this inner realization. As practitioners chant "Yūzū Nembutsu Namu Amida Butsu", they transform their present world of suffering into a luminous Pure Land of peace and wisdom.

The act of reciting the Nembutsu is believed to have transformative effects on the mind, speech, and body. Practitioners are encouraged to focus single-mindedly on the Nembutsu, which naturally reduces negative speech, fosters a calm mind, and encourages a composed and respectful posture. This spiritual discipline aligns the practitioner's actions with virtuous conduct, reflecting a form of comprehensive moral cultivation. Yūzū Nembutsu emphasizes that true peace and fulfillment are not distant ideals but can be realized by recognizing the inherent Buddha-nature within oneself and others. The tradition encourages practitioners to embrace the present moment, fostering a sense of gratitude, harmony, and interconnectedness with all beings. By awakening to this understanding through Nembutsu practice, individuals are believed to contribute to a more compassionate and enlightened world.
